= Malden =

Malden may refer to:

== Places ==
=== United Kingdom ===
- Old Malden, historically known as Malden, Kingston upon Thames, England
- Malden Rushett, Kingston upon Thames, England
- New Malden, Kingston upon Thames, England

=== United States ===
- Malden, Illinois, a village
- Malden, Indiana, an unincorporated community
- Malden, Massachusetts, a city
- Malden, Missouri, a city
- Malden, New York, a census-designated place
- Malden, Washington, a town
- Malden, West Virginia, an unincorporated community
- Malden Hollow, a stream in the U.S. state of Missouri

=== Elsewhere ===
- Malden, Netherlands
- Malden Island, an uninhabited island in the central Pacific Ocean belonging to the Republic of Kiribati
- Fort Malden, a history museum in Amherstburg, Ontario, Canada

=== In fiction ===
- Malden, a fictional country and recurring setting in the Operation Flashpoint and Arma video game franchises, based on Lefkada, Greece

== People with the surname ==
- Charles Robert Malden, (1797–1855), British naval officer, surveyor and educator
- Ernest Malden (1870–1955), English cricketer
- Eustace Malden (1863–1947), English cricketer
- Henry Malden (1800–1876), academic
- Henry Charles Malden, (1829–1907), English schoolmaster
- Henry Elliot Malden (1849–1931), known as H E Malden, Fellow and honorary secretary of the Royal Historical Society
- Jack Malden (1899–1963), English cricketer
- Karl Malden (1912–2009), American actor
- Richard Malden (1879–1951), English churchman and writer

== Other ==
- Malden Mills, an American textile company

== See also ==
- Maldon (disambiguation)
- Morden (disambiguation)
