= Maldwyn =

Maldwyn may refer to:

- Maldwyn James (1913–2003), Welsh international rugby union player
- Maldwyn Jones (1922–2007), historian who specialised in American history
- Radio Maldwyn, local commercial radio station serving Mid Wales and the English border counties
- Maldwyn Evans (1937–2009), Welsh bowls champion
- Maldwyn Pope (born 1960), Welsh musician and composer
- Maldwyn, a Welsh name of Montgomeryshire

== See also ==
- Cwmni Theatr Ieuenctid Maldwyn, music and theatre group based in mid Wales
- Malden (disambiguation)
- Maldon (disambiguation)
- Maldòn
