= Molenhoek =

- Village
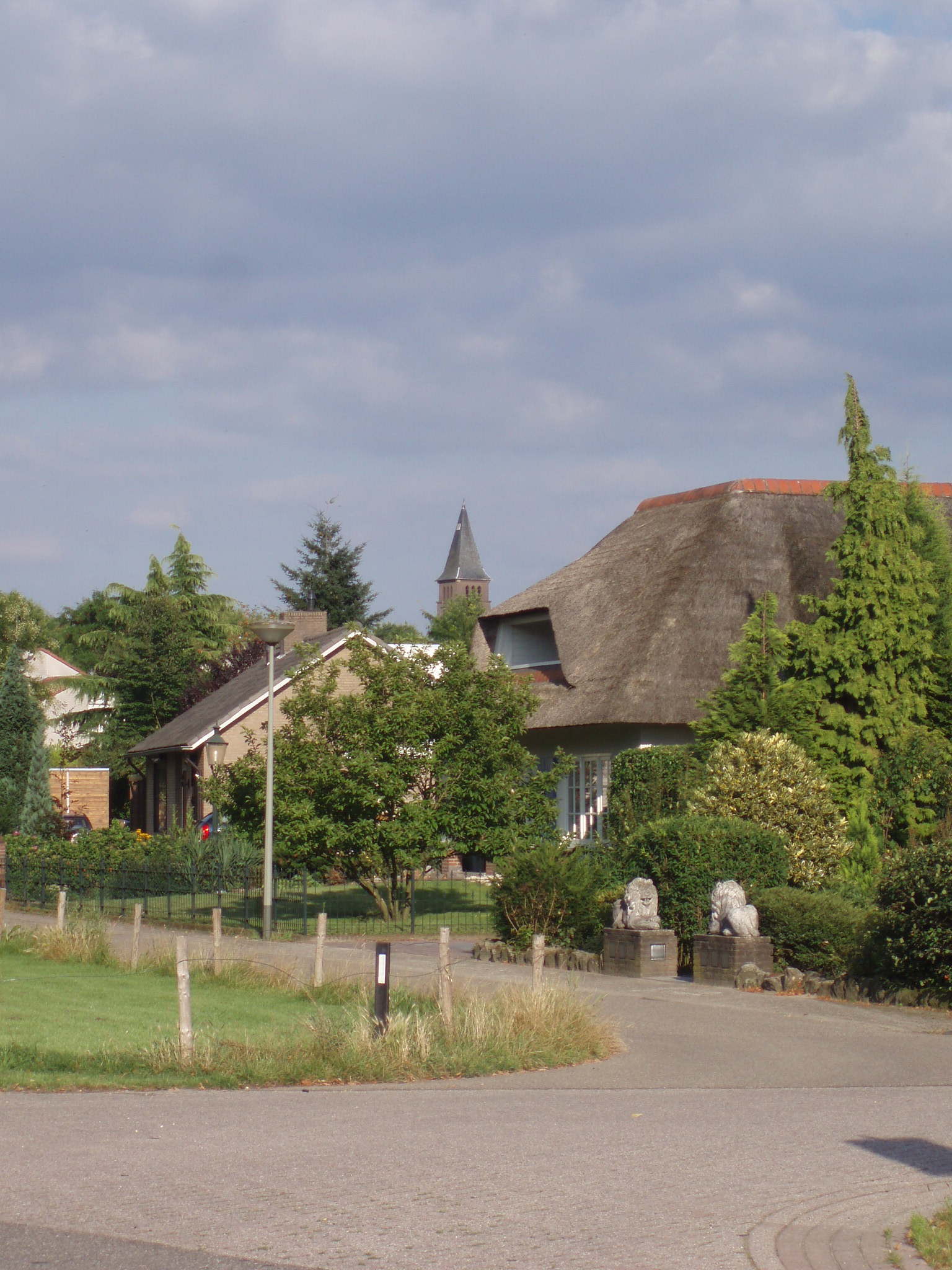
- Church in Molenhoek

- Location in the province of Gelderland in the Netherlands Molenhoek (Limburg, Netherlands) Molenhoek (Netherlands)
- Coordinates: 51°45′58″N 5°52′26″E
- Country: Netherlands
- Province: Limburg/Gelderland
- Municipality: Mook en Middelaar/Heumen

Area
  - Total: 3.66 km^{2} (1.41 sq mi)
- Elevation: 12 m (39 ft)

Population (2021)
  - Total: 3,930
  - Density: 1,070/km^{2} (2,780/sq mi)
- Time zone: UTC+1 (CET)
  - Summer (DST): UTC+2 (CEST)
- Postal code: 6582 & 6584
- Dialing code: 024

Molenhoek (Dutch pronunciation: [ˈmoːlə(n)ˌɦuk]) is a village located in south-eastern Netherlands partially in the municipality of Mook en Middelaar in the province of Limburg and partially in the municipality of Heumen in the province of Gelderland. It is also the northernmost town of Limburg and thus its nickname is "De Poort van Limburg" (The Gate of Limburg).

Molenhoek lies on the Maas river; the Maas–Waal Canal connects the Maas at Molenhoek to the Waal near Nijmegen.

In the Gelderland part of the village the former Bergzigt (later De Raaf) brewery is located.

== Gallery ==
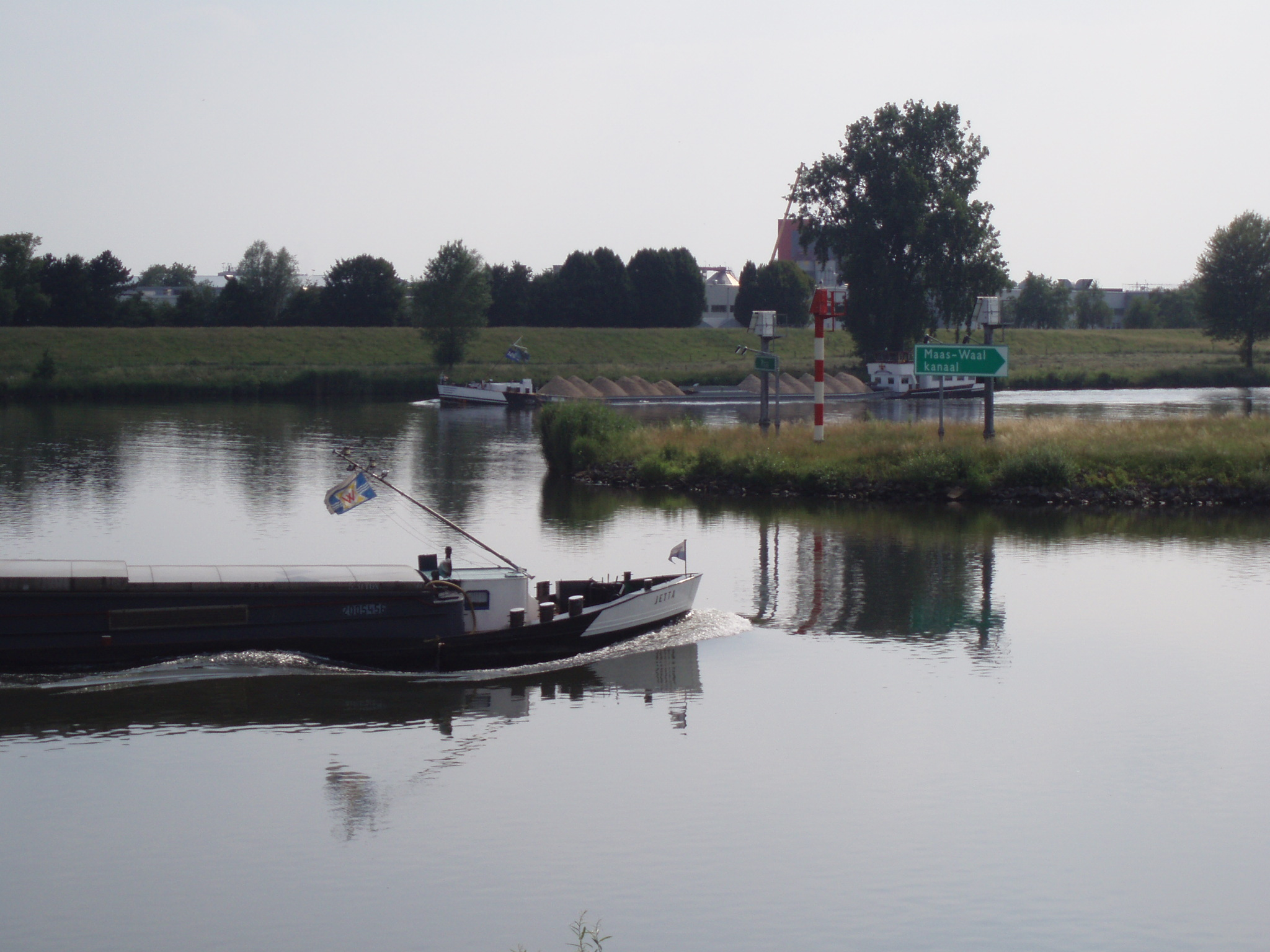
Molenhoek, Meuse and Meuse-Waal Canal

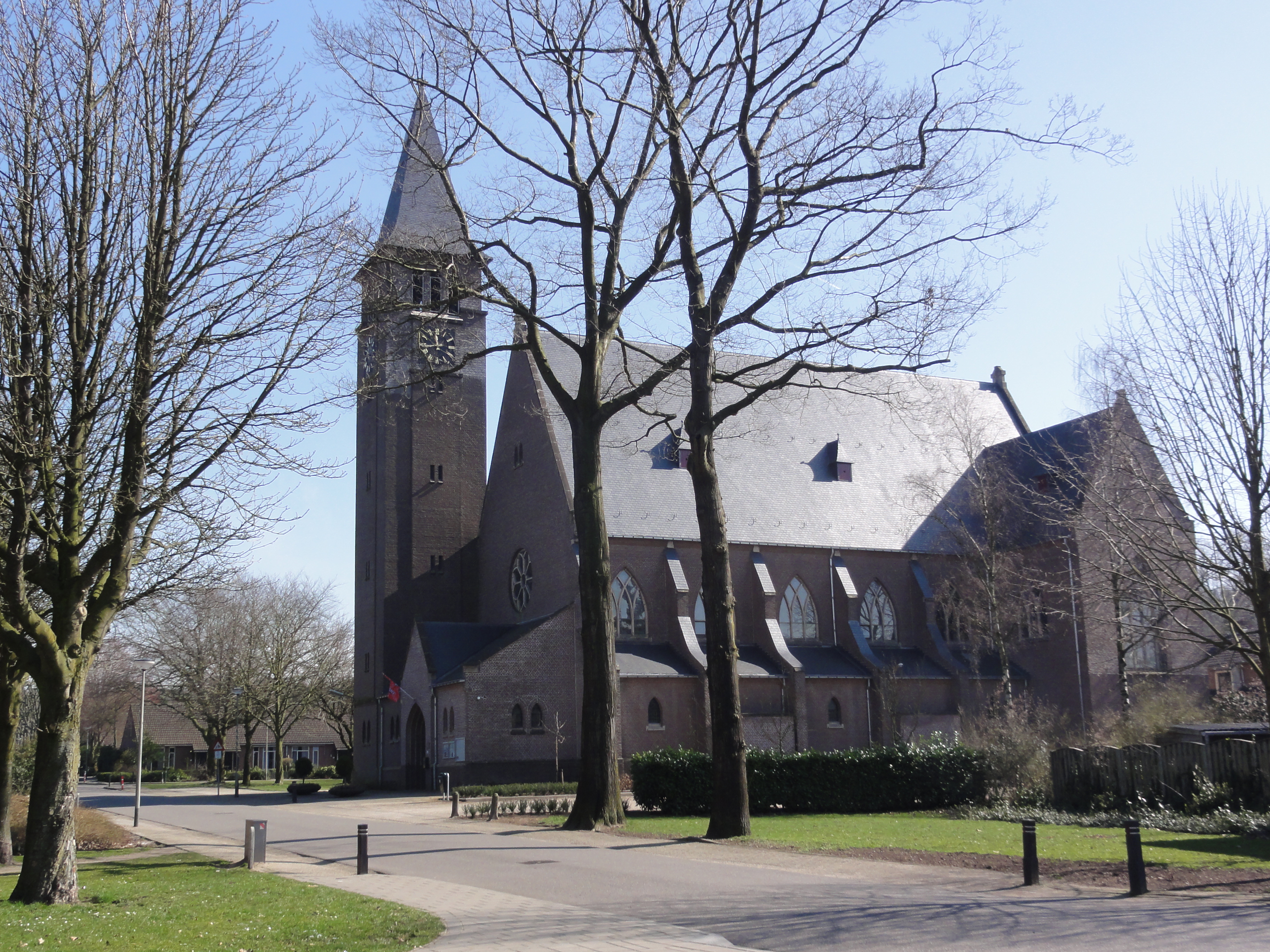
Molenhoek, Church

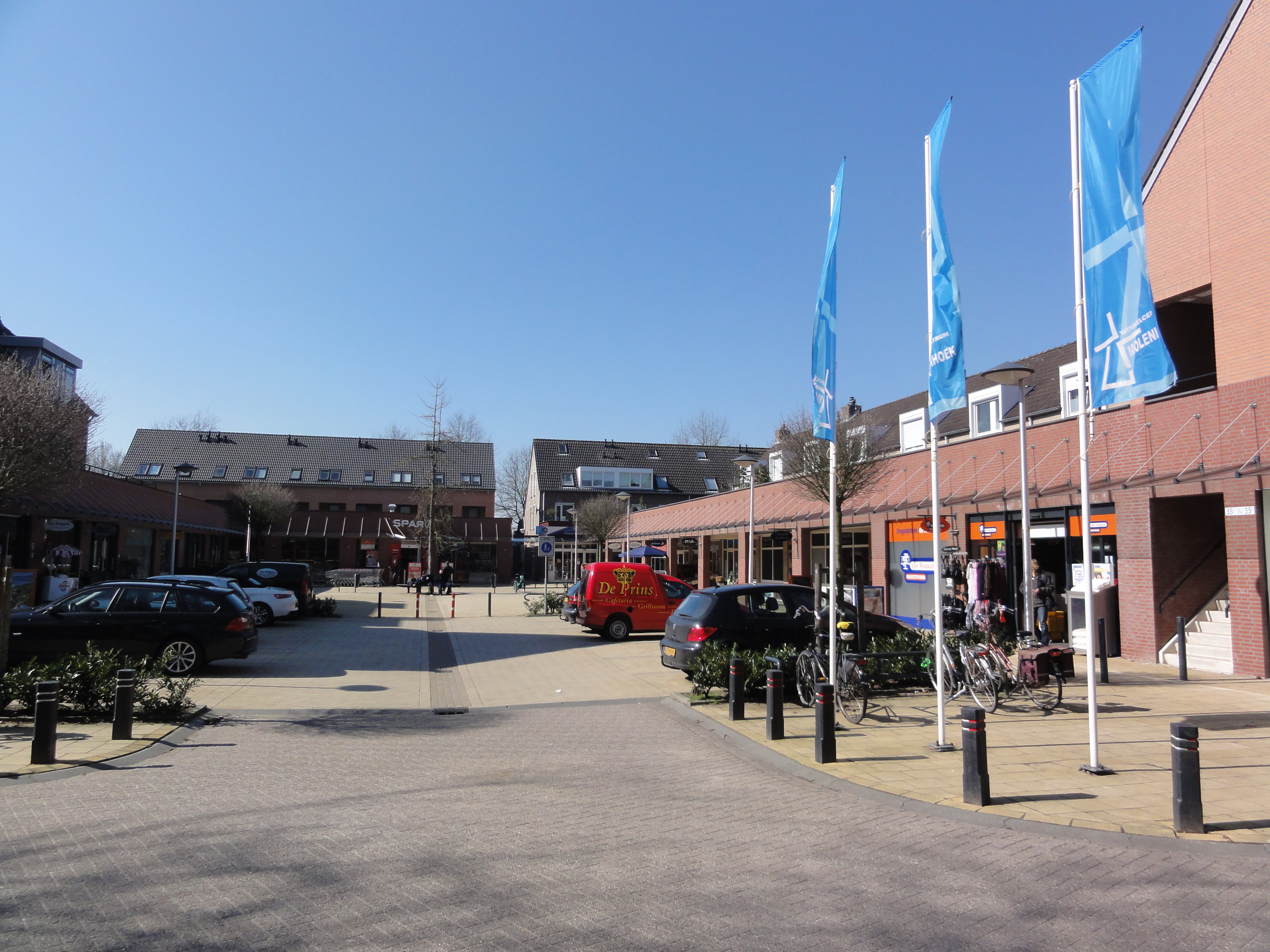
Molenhoek, Shopping center
