= John S. Thompson =

John S. Thompson can refer to:

- John Sparrow David Thompson, Canadian lawyer, judge, and politician
- Jocko Thompson, born John Samuel Thompson, Major League Baseball pitcher

- John S. Thompsonbrug, the John S. Thompson Bridge in Grave, the Netherlands, named after him
