= Maas–Waal Canal =

Canal in the Netherlands

Coordinates: 51°48′1″N 5°49′14″E

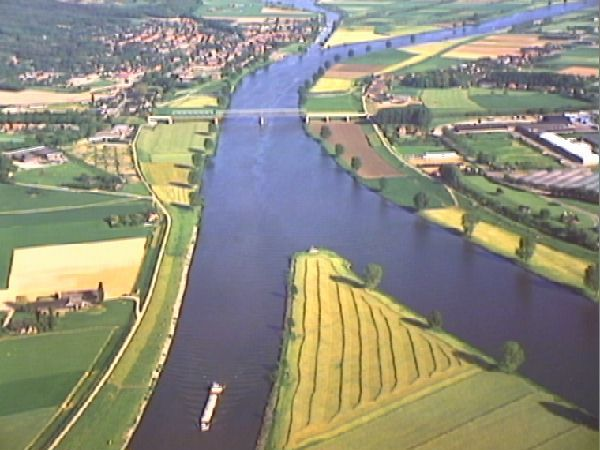
- Aerial view of the river Maas and the Maas–Waal Canal near Heumen

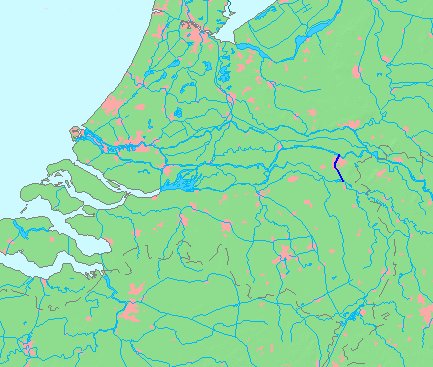
- Location of the Maas–Waal Canal
- Interactive map of Maas–Waal Canal

Specifications
- Length: 13.5 km (8.4 miles)
- Locks: 2
- Status: open

History
- Construction began: 1920
- Date completed: 1927
- Date extended: 1970

Geography
- Start point: Weurt
- End point: Heumen

The Maas–Waal Canal (Dutch: Maas–Waalkanaal) is a canal in the Netherlands that connects the river Meuse (Dutch: Maas) to the river Waal. The channel is about 13.5 kilometres (8.4 mi) long and runs from Weurt (west of Nijmegen) to the south and ends at Heumen. The connection of the Meuse and the Maas–Waal Canal is the tripoint between the provinces of Gelderland, Limburg and North Brabant.

== History ==
Construction on the canal began in 1920. On 27 October 1927, the waterway was officially opened by Queen Wilhelmina. Before the canal was dug, ships had to make a detour of about 100 km (62 mi) to change from Heumen to Nijmegen to reach the German hinterland; the new route shortened the trip to about 12 km (7.5 mi).

The construction isolated the village in a hard-to-reach corner between the Meuse and the canal. The village of Neerbosch was cut in half, and the centre of the village of Hatert was torn down to make room for a bridge across the canal. The village also lost its church and both pubs.

In 1970, it was decided to widen the canal at an estimated cost of 117 million Dutch guilders (53 million euro). At around the same time, the city of Nijmegen decided to construct a new neighborhood, Dukenburg, on the western side of the canal. Less than 10 years later, another neighborhood, Lindenholt, was added in the area where the older part of Neerbosch had been. This left the canal lying largely inside the built-up area of Nijmegen.

== Water level ==
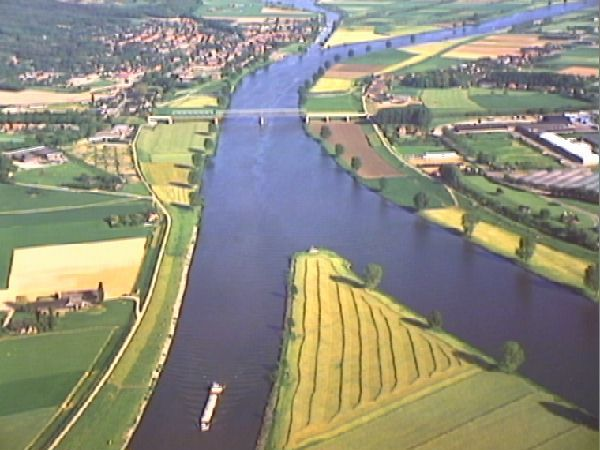
Aerial view of the river Maas and the Maas–Waal Canal near Heumen

Although the canal is located entirely in Gelderland, the management is in the hands of Rijkswaterstaat directorate Limburg. There is a lock in Weurt and another in Heumen. The latter is almost always open, because the water of the Maas at Heumen is maintained at a constant level through a weir in Grave.

In 2007 and 2008 several bridges were jacked up by 25 to 35 cm (9.8 to 13.8 in), so that the water level in the channel could be increased. This allowed container ships with four layers of containers to use the canal. Raising the water level in the canal will lead to higher groundwater levels in areas directly adjacent to the canal. Rijkswaterstaat will construct a drainage system to prevent possible negative consequences.

== Bridges ==
From north to south, the Maas–Waal Canal is bridged by the following roads:

- Industrieweg (across the lock at Weurt)
- Neerbosscheweg (called the "Neerbossche Brug")
- Graafseweg (called the "Graafse Brug")
- New Dukenburgseweg (called the "Dukenburgse Brug")
- Hatertseweg (called the "Hatertse Brug")
- Blankenbergseweg (called "the Hoge Brug")
- Jan J. Luden Avenue (across the lock at Heumen)
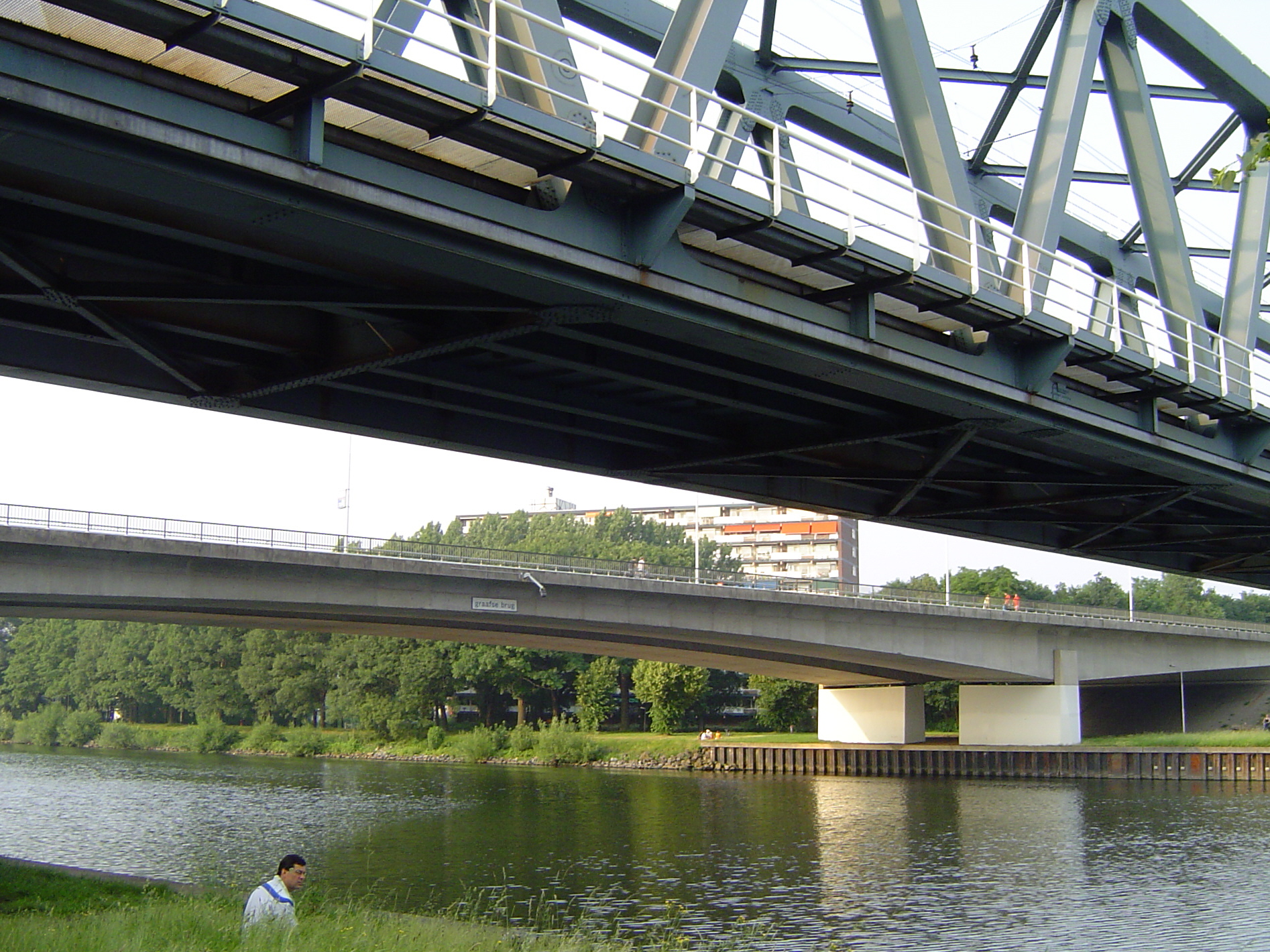
Graafsebrug and railway bridge

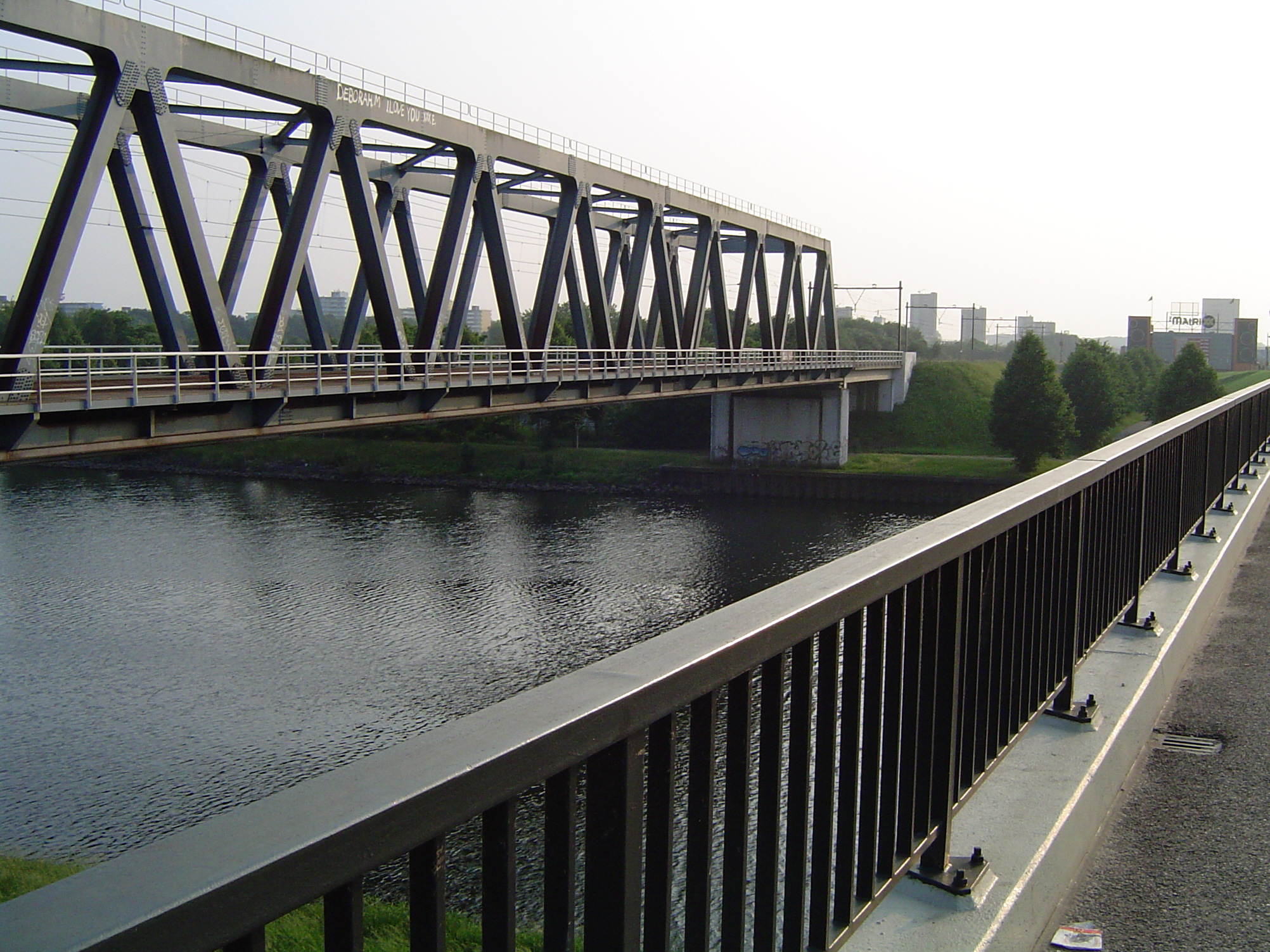
Railway bridge

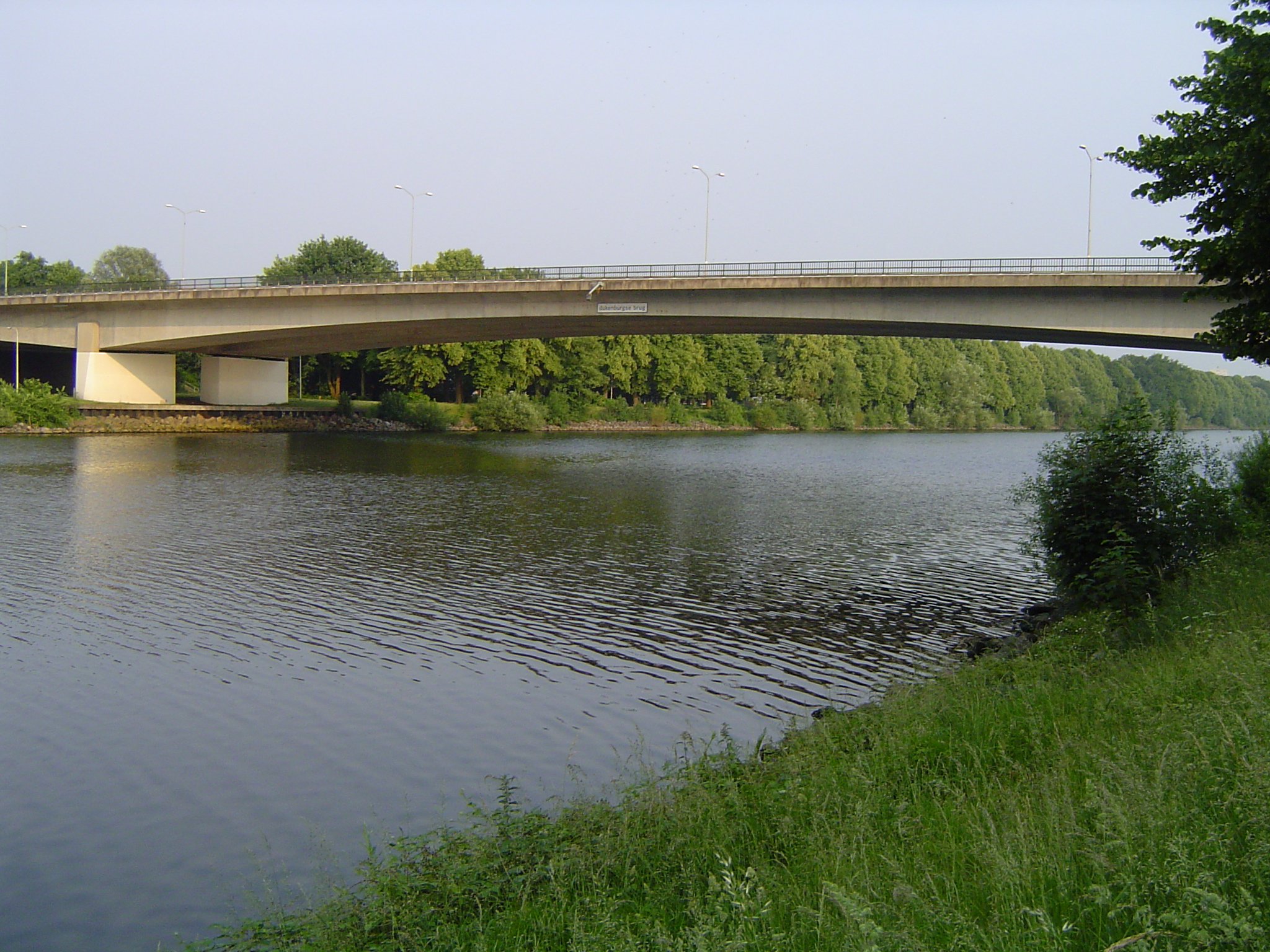
Dukenburg bridge

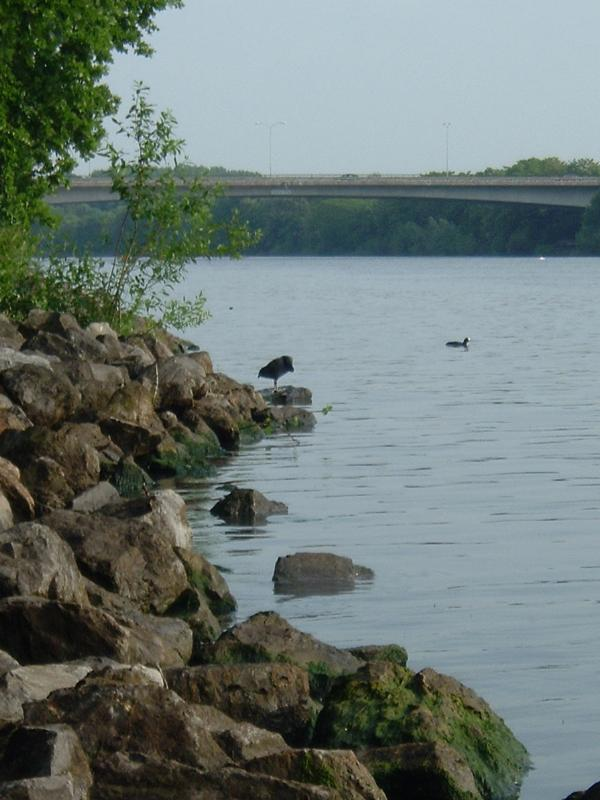
Hatertse Bridge

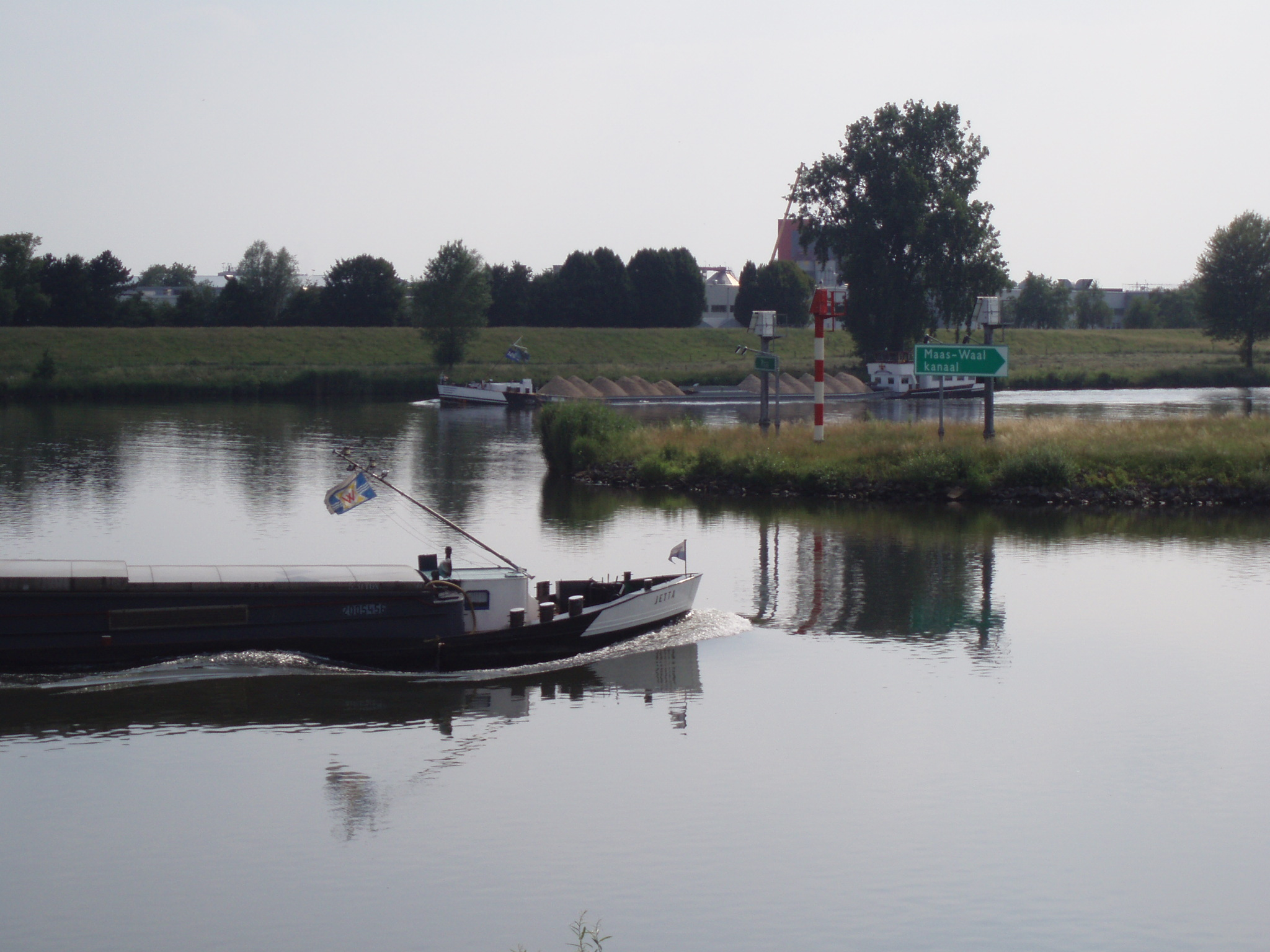
Joining the Meuse
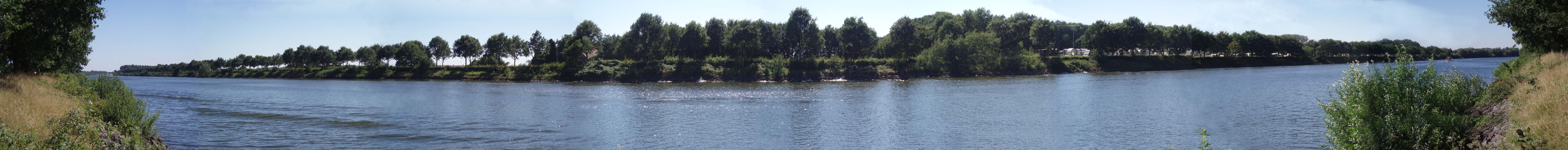
The Maas–Waal Canal as seen from Malden
