= Nederasselt =

- Village
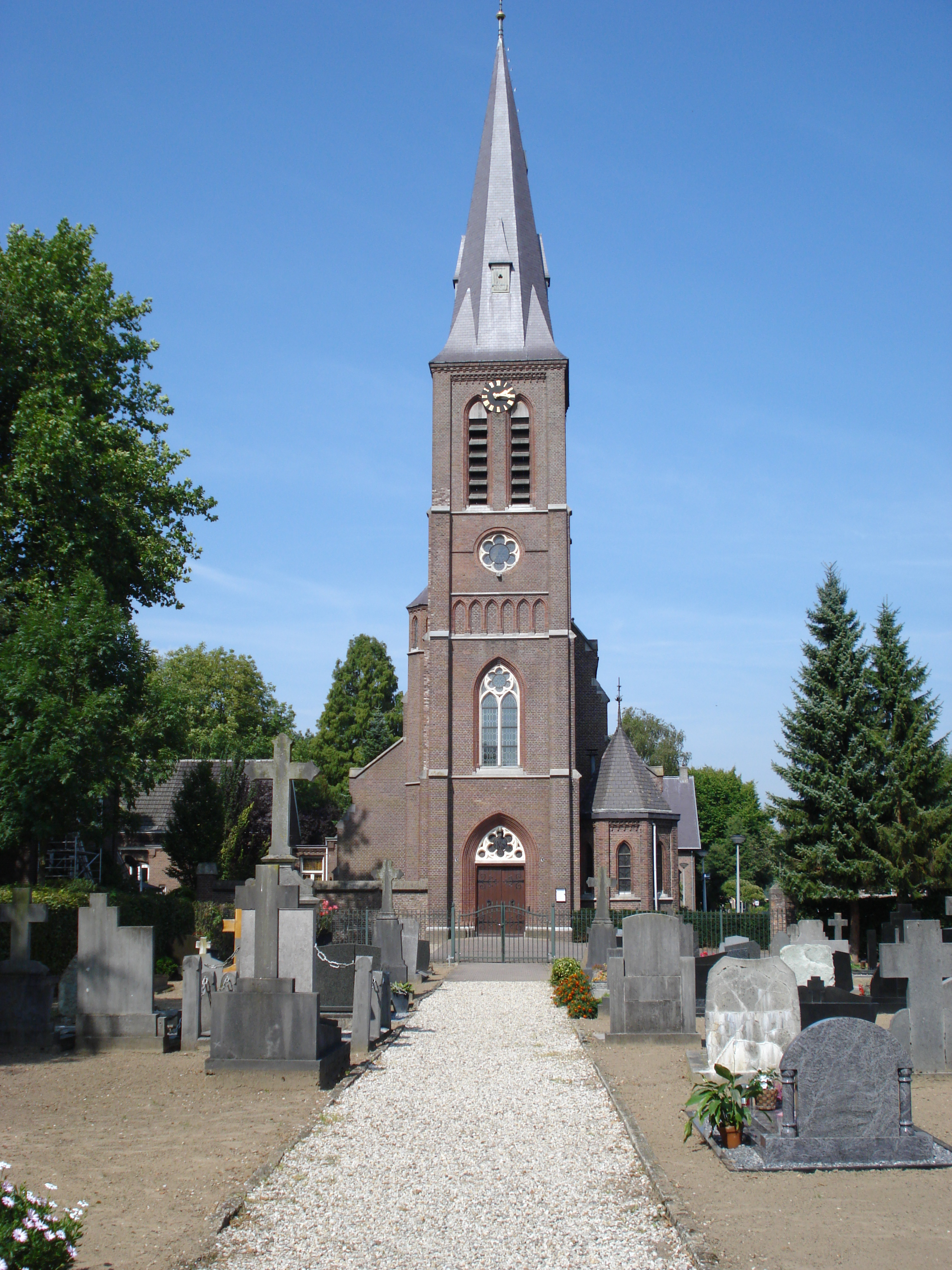
- Catholic church of Nederasselt

- Location in the province of Gelderland in the Netherlands Nederasselt (Netherlands)
- Coordinates: 51°46′20″N 5°44′45″E
- Country: Netherlands
- Province: Gelderland
- Municipality: Heumen

Area
  - Total: 4.21 km^{2} (1.63 sq mi)
- Elevation: 8 m (26 ft)

Population (2021)
  - Total: 765
  - Density: 182/km^{2} (471/sq mi)
- Time zone: UTC+1 (CET)
  - Summer (DST): UTC+2 (CEST)
- Postal code: 6612
- Dialing code: 024

Nederasselt (Dutch pronunciation: [neːdərˈʔɑsəlt, -ˈrɑsəlt]) is a village in the municipality of Heumen in the province of Gelderland, the Netherlands.

== History ==
The village was first mentioned in 1301 as Nederassel, and means "lower open forest with ash (Fraxinus excelsior) trees". Neder (lower) has been added to distinguish between Overasselt. Nederasselt separated from Overasselt in the 12th century and developed on a ridge.

The Dutch Reformed church is a small square church built in 1804. In 1930, a consistory and tower were added. The Catholic St Antony Abt is a Gothic Revival basilica-like church constructed between 1890 and 1891.

Nederasselt was home to 134 people in 1840. In 1929, the road from Den Bosch to Nijmegen (nowadays: N324) was constructed, and the village started to extend towards the road.

The John S. Thompsonbrug was built as part of the road. It is mainly located in Nederasselt and was captured on 17 September 1944 by the 82nd Airborne Division under the command of Jocko Thompson during Operation Market Garden. Near the bridge is also a sluice and weir.

== Gallery ==
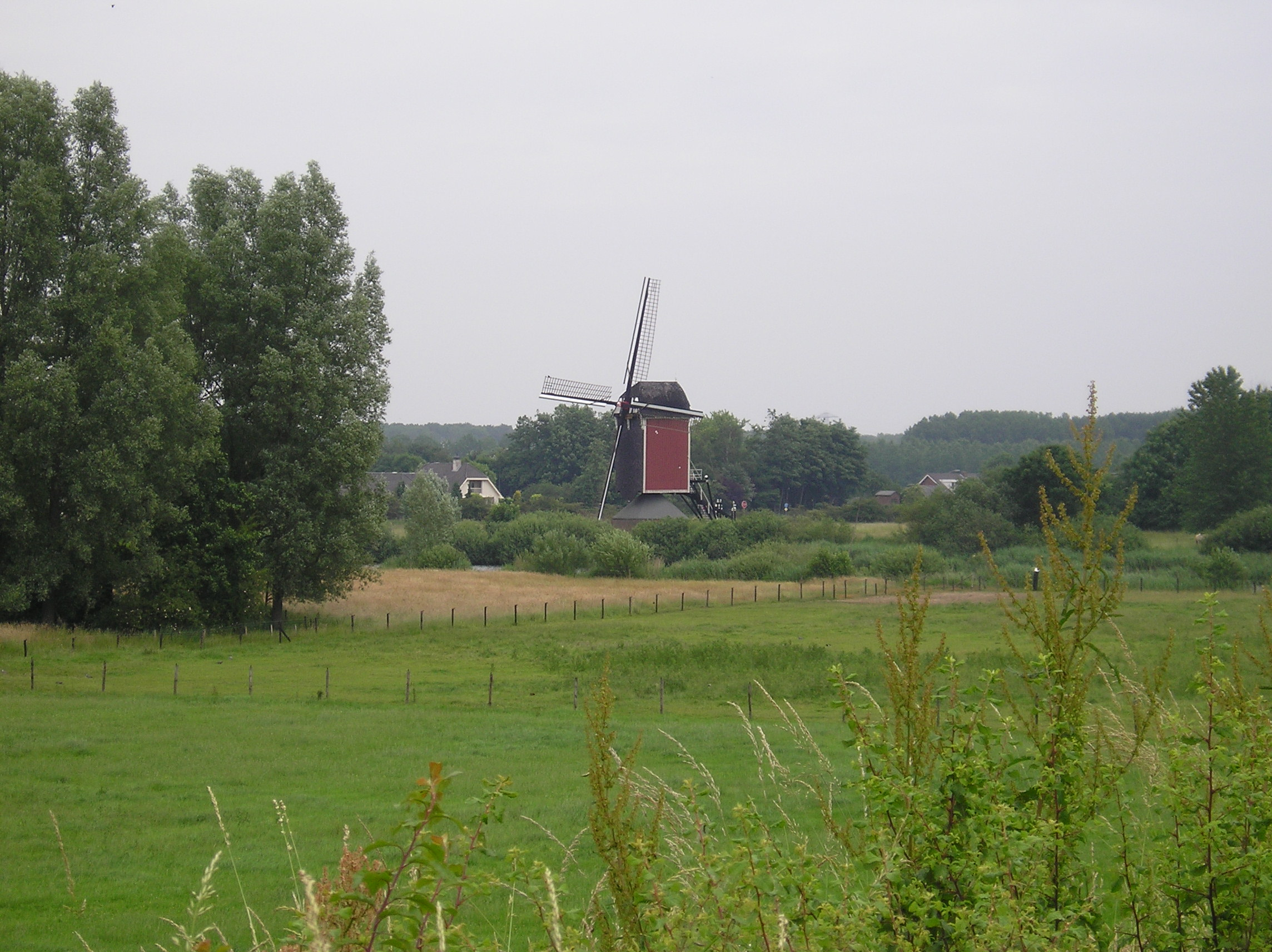
Mill near Nederasselt

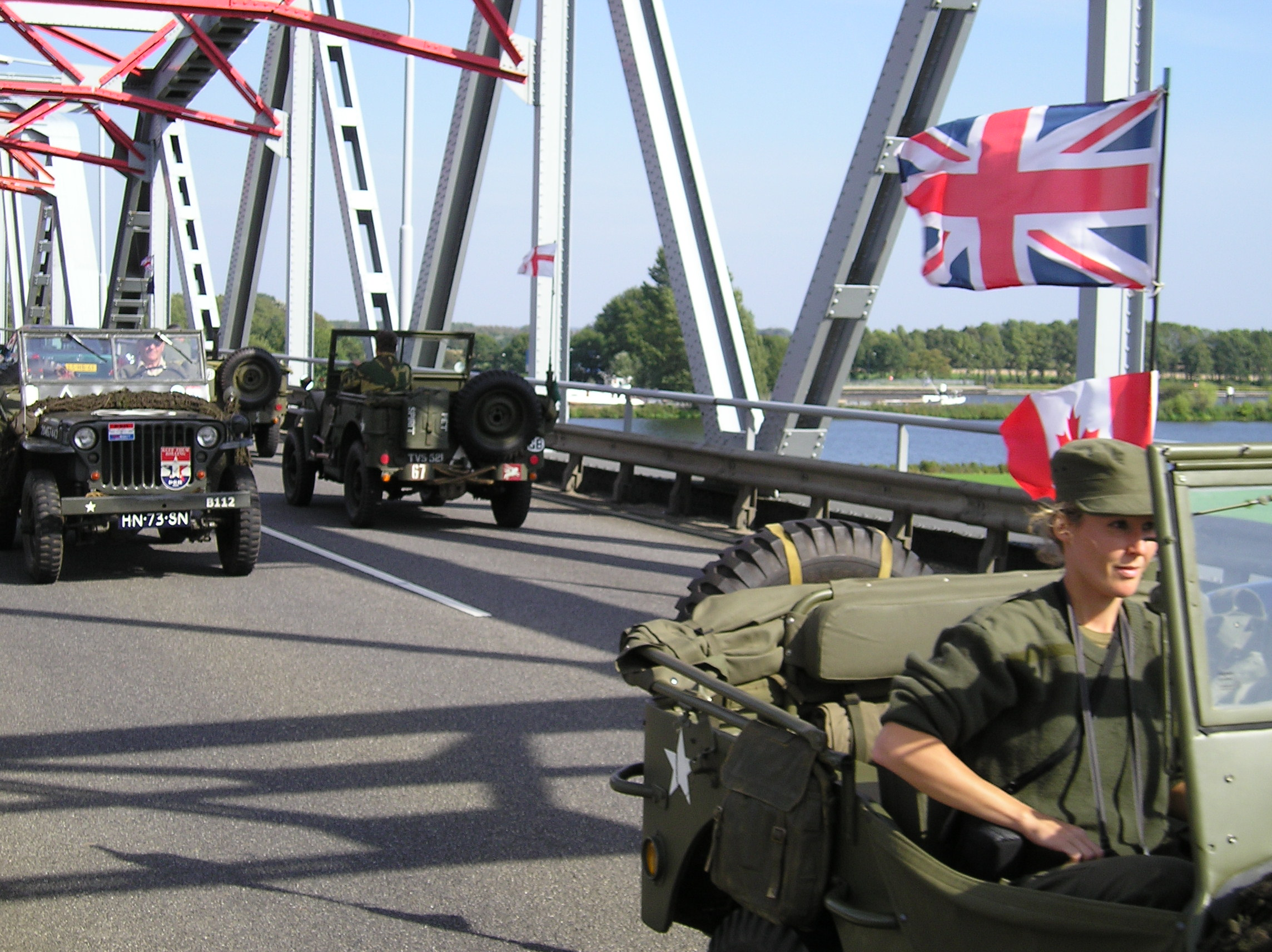
Military vehicles on the John S. Thompsonbrug

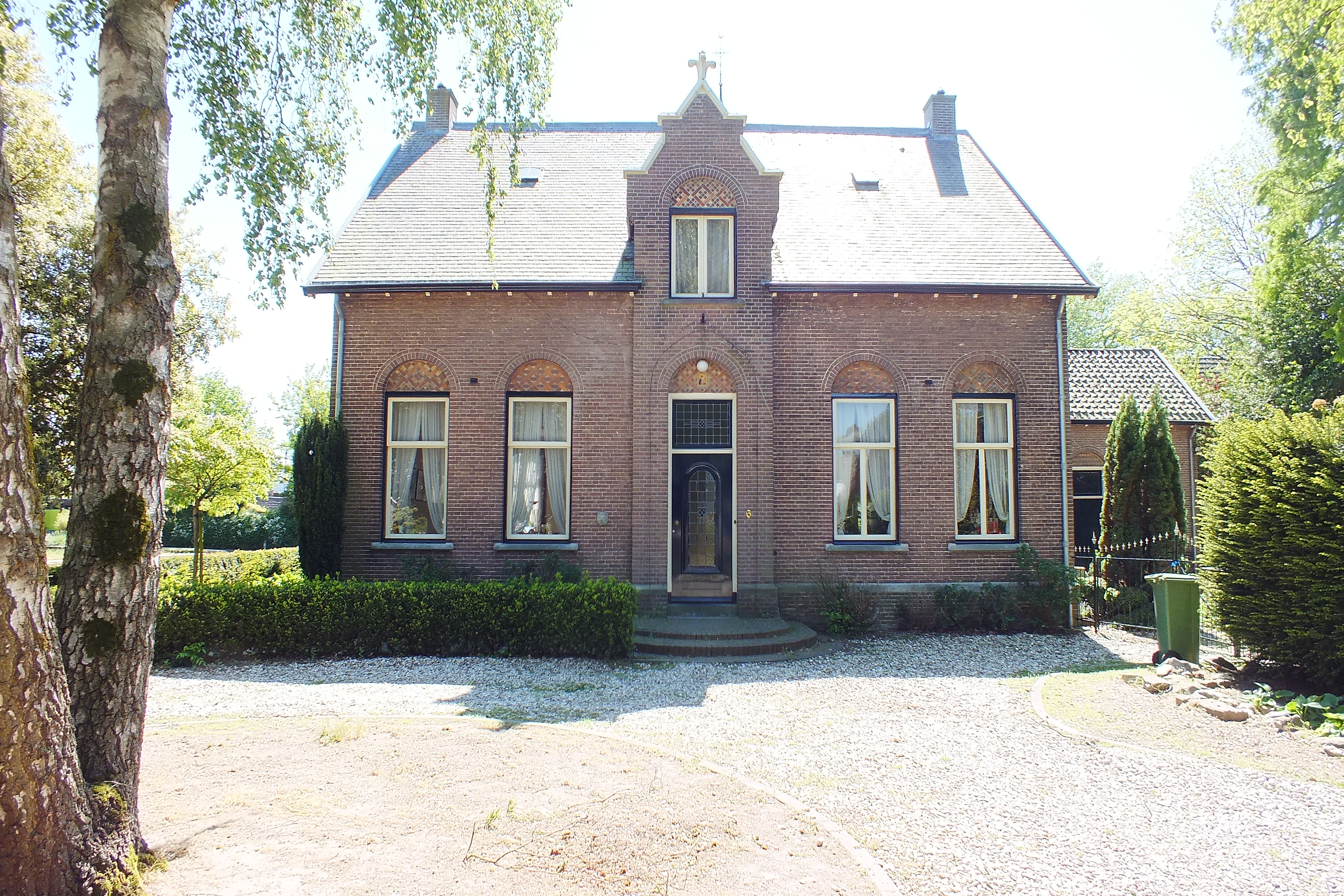
Former clergy house

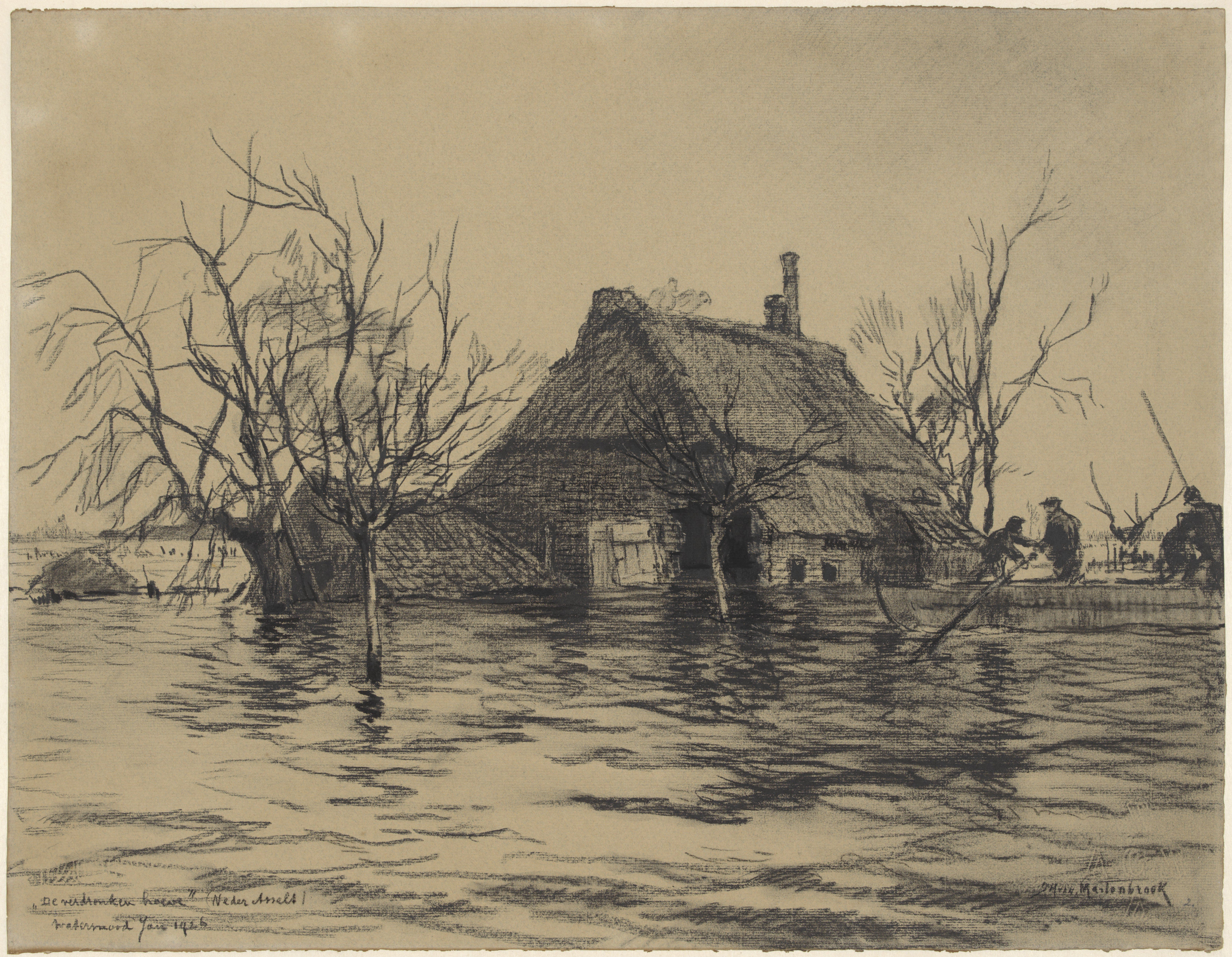
Drawing of a flooded farm (1926)
