= Jos Leijdekkers =

Dutch criminal (born 1991)

- Born: Joseph Johannes Leijdekkers; 1 July 1991 (age 35); Breda, Netherlands
- Status: Fugitive
- Other names: Omar Sheriff, Bolle Jos, Chubby Josh
- Convictions: Attempted manslaughter (served), large-scale cocaine trafficking, armed robbery, attempted extortion, incitement to murder, aggravated assault
- Penalty: Served: 6 years imprisonment; in absentia: cumulative sentences including multiple multi-year terms, fines, asset forfeiture and a large repayment order
- Accomplices: Ridouan Taghi, Roger P., Edin Gačanin

Joseph Johannes "Jos" Leijdekkers (born 1 July 1991), commonly known as Omar Sheriff or Bolle Jos (Chubby Josh), is a Dutch fugitive and high-level drug trafficker wanted for involvement in large-scale cocaine trafficking, violent crimes, armed robberies, and contract killings. Since May 2022, he has been listed on the Dutch National Most Wanted List and the EU Most Wanted List. Dutch police put a bounty of €2 million for the tip-off that would lead to his arrest.

Leijdekkers has been convicted in absentia in both the Netherlands and Belgium and faces multiple multi-year prison sentences and large financial penalties.

== Early life ==
Leijdekkers was born in Breda and grew up in Prinsenbeek. During his youth, he attended several schools and came into contact with the criminal justice system early in life.

Leijdekkers's father reportedly had ties to drug trafficking networks and contacts in the ports of Rotterdam and Antwerp, which Leijdekkers later expanded for his own alleged activities.

== Criminal career ==
Leijdekkers has been connected to several violent incidents, including a 2011 shooting in Scheveningen in which a rival was shot and another person was wounded. He served a six-year sentence related to that case.

By 2018, Leijdekkers had emerged as an influential broker in international cocaine trafficking; a tip in March 2018 helped authorities link his name to ongoing investigations.

Leijdekkers is alleged to have organised drug shipments from Central and South America into European ports, using corrupt port employees and international contacts. Leijdekkers has also been linked to large drug operations such as the Cherokee case in Amsterdam-Zuidoost and to the disappearance of Naima Tante Jillal in 2019. Fleeing Dutch authorities, he fled to Spain and later Dubai.

Since 2020, he resided in Turkey. He was reportedly arrested twice, but managed to bribe himself free both times. In 2023, his brother and several accomplices were arrested in Turkey, but were unexpectedly let go; the judges were suspected to have been bought off.

== Sierra Leone ==
In the second half of 2022, Leijdekkers arrived in Sierra Leone, posing as a Turkish investor named Omar Sheriff.

In early 2025, Dutch media reported footage suggesting Leijdekkers was present in Sierra Leone and pictured near President Julius Maada Bio and First Lady Fatima Bio during a New Year's church service.

Additional video allegedly showed Leijdekkers interacting with senior officials, after which the head of the Sierra Leone immigration service was dismissed when the footage became public.

Sierra Leonean authorities reportedly denied knowledge of Leijdekkers's presence despite Dutch requests, and journalists in Sierra Leone have said they faced pressure, offers of bribes, and threats related to reporting on the case.

Media outlets have also reported that Leijdekkers is linked to Agnes Bio, the president's daughter, and that he used aliases while allegedly receiving protection from some local actors; some reports stated he fathered a child with the president's daughter.

In May 2026, Spanish authorities intercepted more than 30.2 tons of cocaine from Arconian, a Comoros-flagged dry bulk ship off Dakhla, Western Sahara. It was the biggest single seizing of cocaine ever. Researchers suspect that this and other massive shipments of cocaine to Europe from Sierra Leone are organized by Leijdekkers.

In September 2026, the 1843 magazine reported that Leijdekkers was using Sierra Leone as a major operation base for smuggling South American cocaine to Europe. That same month, he was linked to a shootout between gunmen and police over a seized drug shipment in Overasselt, Holland.

== Convictions and financial orders ==
Leijdekkers has been convicted in multiple proceedings in the Netherlands and Belgium, often in absentia, receiving a series of multi-year sentences and financial penalties. Notable judgments include:

- 2011: Six years' imprisonment for a shooting in Scheveningen (sentence served).
- 22 February 2024: Twelve years' imprisonment and significant asset forfeiture in a Genk, Belgium case involving a front company used for trafficking.
- 25 June 2024: Sentenced to 24 years in the Netherlands for international cocaine trafficking and ordering a murder.
- 26 September 2024: Ten years' imprisonment in Antwerp in the Dossier-Zwemmer case.
- 25 February 2025: Thirteen years' imprisonment for a cocaine robbery at Antwerp customs.
- 20 June 2025: Seven years' imprisonment for importing at least 100 kg of cocaine in the Antwerp Court of Appeal.
- 14 July 2025: Rotterdam court ordered repayment obligations and determined a criminal benefit of over €126 million, with a repayment obligation of approximately €96.7 million.
- 23 September 2025: Eight years' imprisonment in Dendermonde for importing roughly 3,500 kg of cocaine.
- 16 January 2026: Seven years' imprisonment in the Hippix case in Antwerp.
- 19 May 2026: Eight years' imprisonment, fines, and a 10-year port ban in Dendermonde for importing approximately 11,000 kg of cocaine; several accomplices also received sentences and fines.

== Popular culture ==
Videoland made a documentary about Leijdekkers in 2025. Sierra Leone rapper Drizilik's song "Sabi Road" included his fake Turkish name Umar Sheriff in the lyrics.

== Personal life ==
Leijdekkers was married to a Dutch-Turkish woman, with whom he has a son.

== See also ==
- Marengo trial
- Mocro Mafia
