= Jack Malden =

English cricketer

Personal information
- Full name: William Jack Malden
- Born: 14 May 1899; Ticehurst, Sussex, England
- Died: 23 November 1963 (aged 64); Newbury, Berkshire, England
- Batting: Right-handed
- Relatives: Eustace Malden (father) (Note: CricketArchive lists two fathers for Jack Malden: Ernest Malden and Eustace Malden. Jack is also listed as "son" on both of their CricketArchive profiles. The 1901 census lists one William J Malden born in 1899 and living in Sussex with his parents Eustace and Eva in Sussex. It seems reasonable to assume, therefore, that Eustace is Jack's father and Ernest his father's cousin.)

Domestic team information
- Years: Team
- 1920–1922: Sussex
- 1921: Cambridge University

Career statistics
Competition	First-class
Matches	24
Runs scored	624
Batting average	17.82
100s/50s	1/0
Top score	100
Catches/stumpings	12/–
- Source: Cricinfo, 24 May 2013

William Jack Malden (14 May 1899 – 23 November 1963) was an English cricketer. Malden was a right-handed batsman. He played mainly for Sussex County Cricket Club.

Malden was born at Ticehurst in Sussex and educated at Haileybury College where he played cricket for the college team between 1914 and 1917, captaining it in his final year. He played for Lord's Schools against The Rest in 1917 and was described as a "good batsman who was also a fine field". After World War I he went up on Cambridge University.

His first-class cricket debut for Sussex came against Leicestershire in the 1920 County Championship, He made nine further first-class appearances during the 1920 season. During the 1921 season Malden played his only first-class match for Cambridge University against the British Army as well as making eleven appearances for Sussex He scored his only first-class century during the season against Warwickshire. He made two further appearances for Sussex in the 1922 County Championship against Gloucestershire and Worcestershire.

Malden died at Kingston Warren near Newbury in Berkshire in November 1963 aged 64. His father Eustace Malden also played first-class cricket as did his father's cousin Ernest Malden.
