= Heumen =

- Municipality
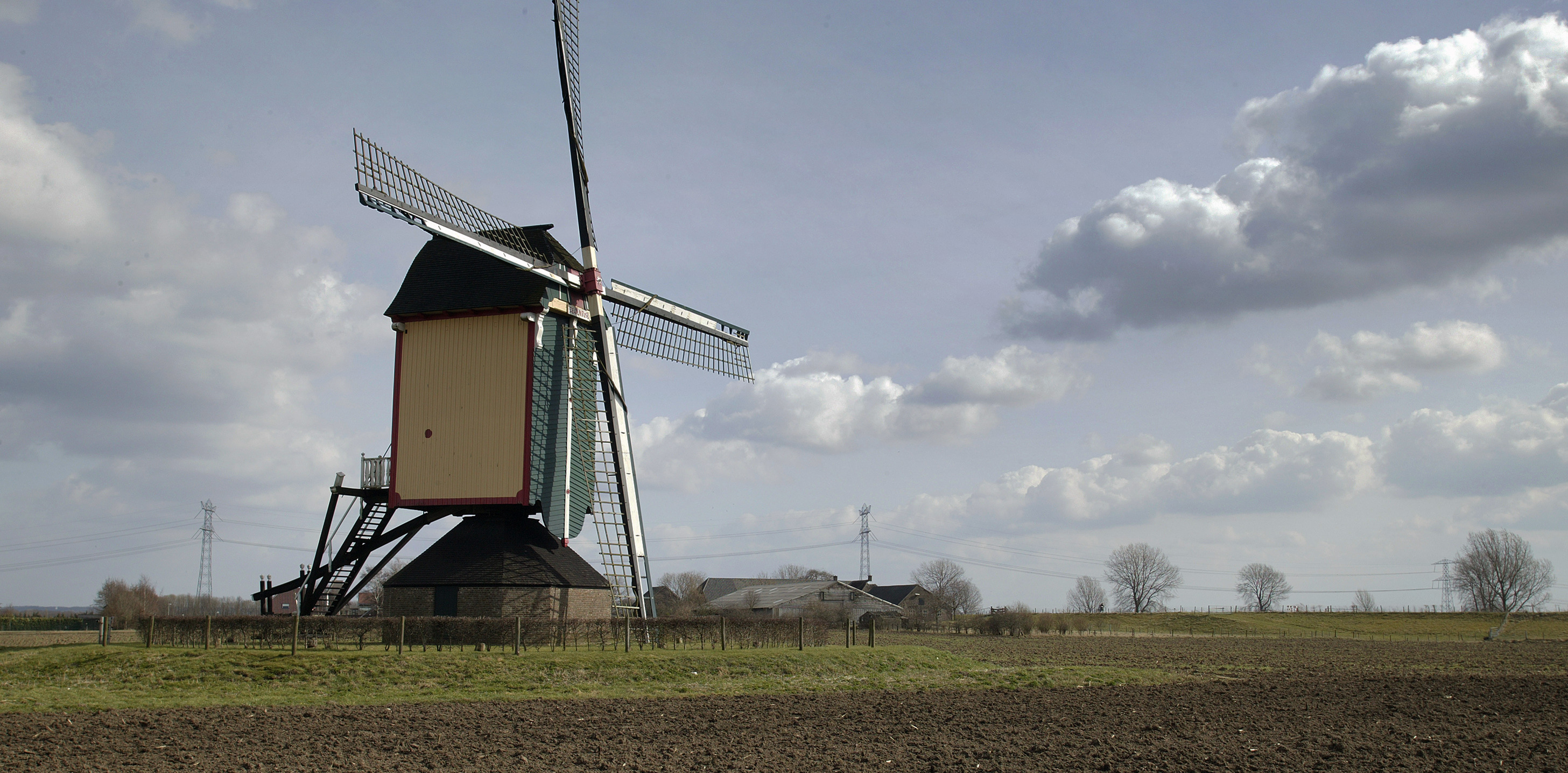
- Windmill near Overasselt

- Flag Coat of arms

- Location in Gelderland
- Coordinates: 51°47′N 5°51′E
- Country: Netherlands
- Province: Gelderland

Government
  - Body: Municipal council
  - Mayor: Marriët Mittendorff (CDA)

Area
  - Total: 41.54 km^{2} (16.04 sq mi)
  - Land: 39.76 km^{2} (15.35 sq mi)
  - Water: 1.78 km^{2} (0.69 sq mi)
- Elevation: 11 m (36 ft)

Population (January 2021)
  - Total: 16,569
  - Density: 417/km^{2} (1,080/sq mi)
- Demonym: Heumenaar
- Time zone: UTC+1 (CET)
  - Summer (DST): UTC+2 (CEST)
- Postcode: 6580–6582, 6610–6612
- Area code: 024
- Website: www.heumen.nl

Heumen (Dutch pronunciation: [ˈɦøːmə(n)]) is a municipality and a village in the eastern Netherlands.

== Population centres ==
- Heumen
- Malden (administrative centre)
- Molenhoek (partly)
- Nederasselt
- Overasselt

=== Topography ===
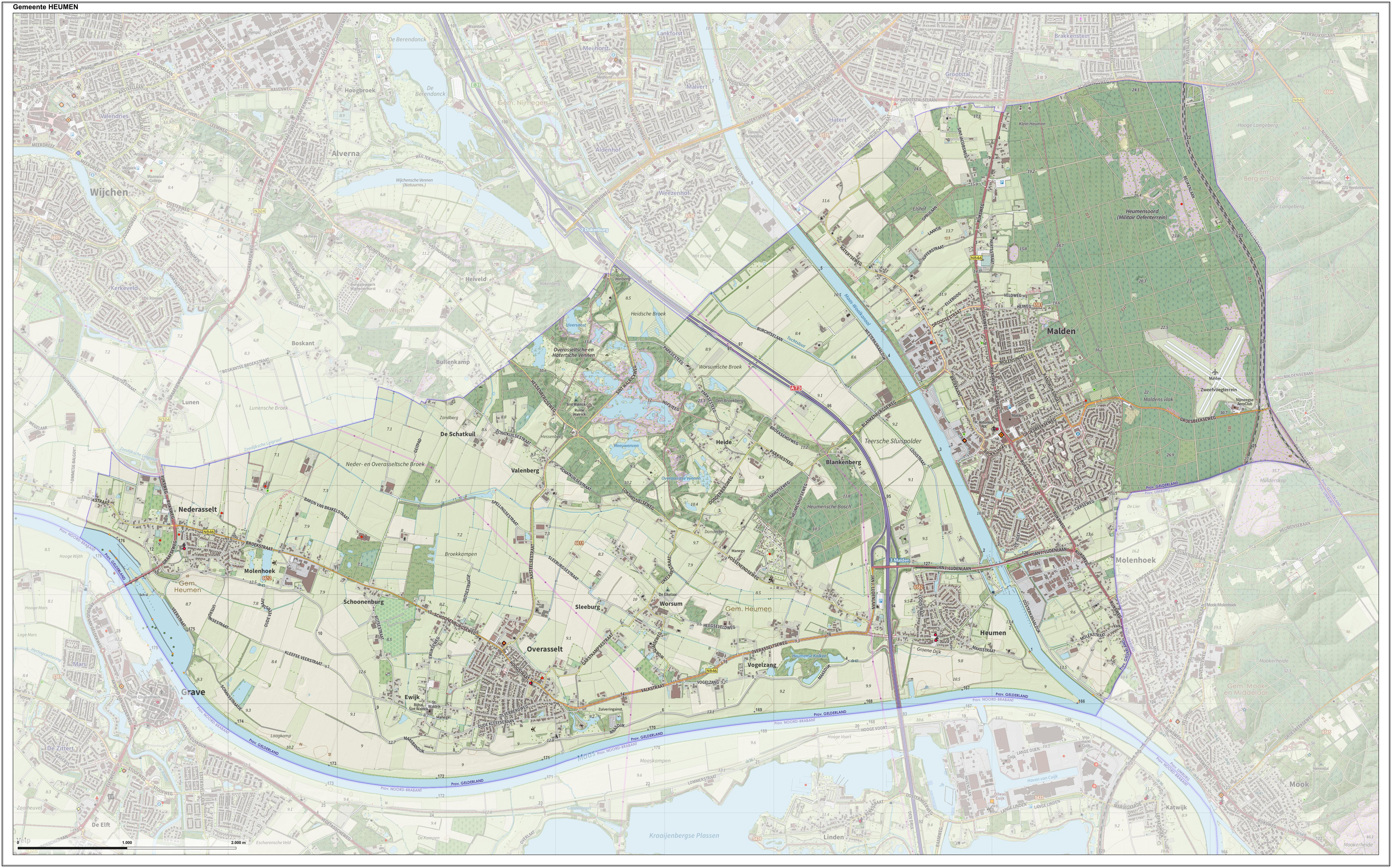

Dutch Topographic map of the municipality of Heumen, June 2015

== Notable people ==
- Wisse Alfred Pierre Smit (1903–1986) a poet and an influential Dutch literary historian of the Dutch Golden Age
- Frans Thijssen (born 1952 in Malden) a former international Dutch footballer with 628 club caps
- Sabina Brons (born 1965) stage name Selena a Dutch singer
- Bram Nuytinck (born 1990) a Dutch footballer with over 270 club caps

== Gallery ==
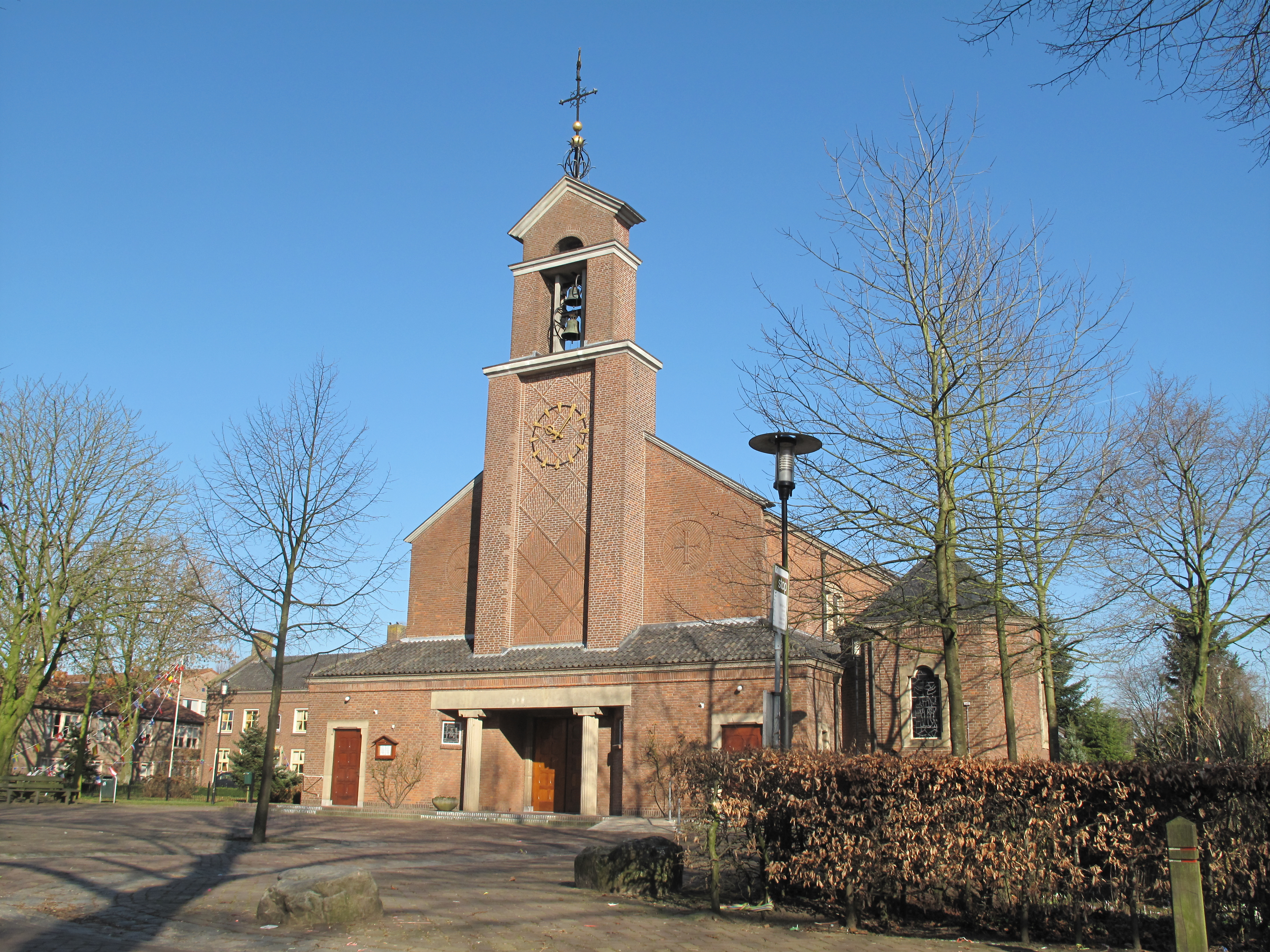
Heumen, the catholic church

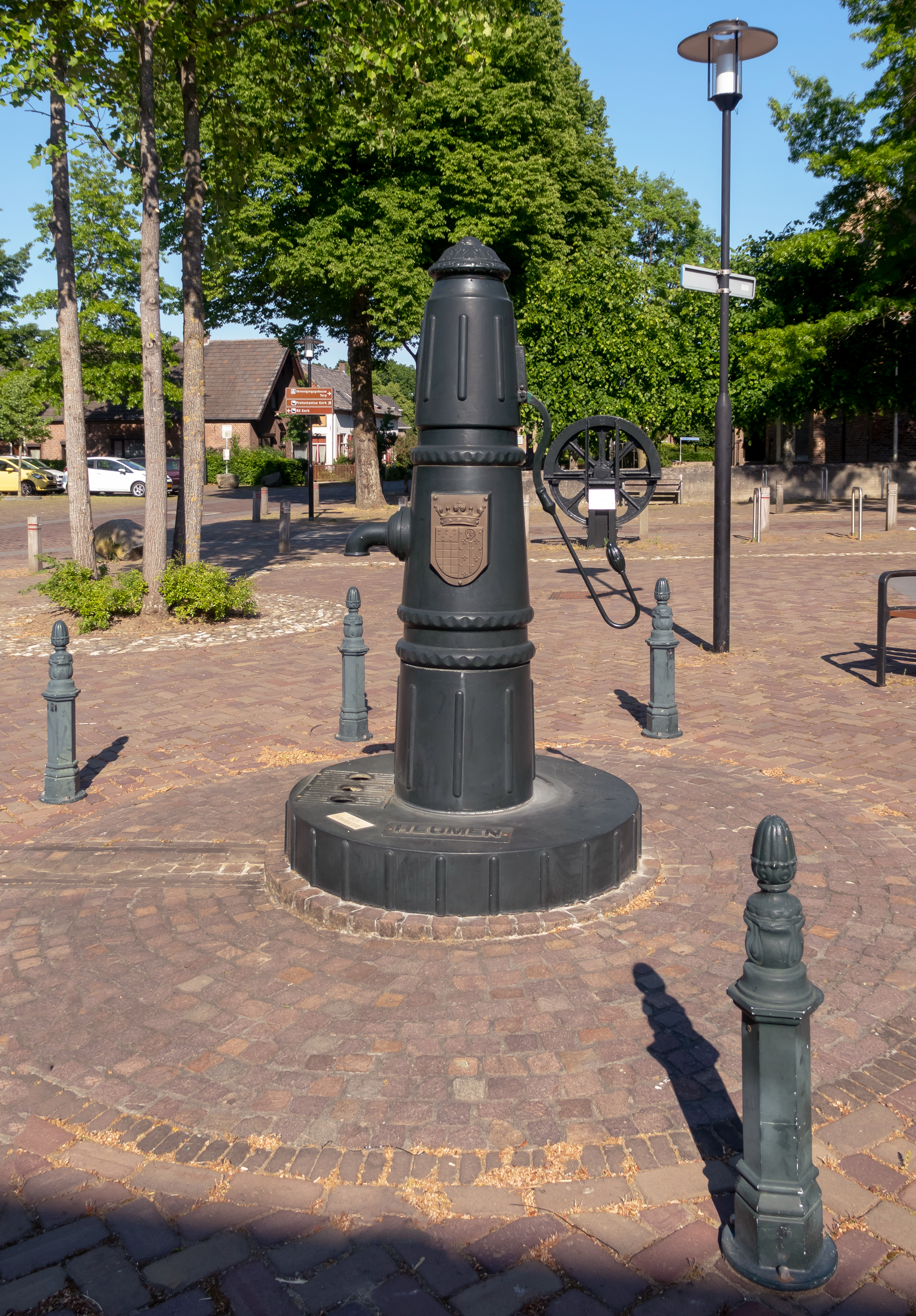
Heumen, water tap

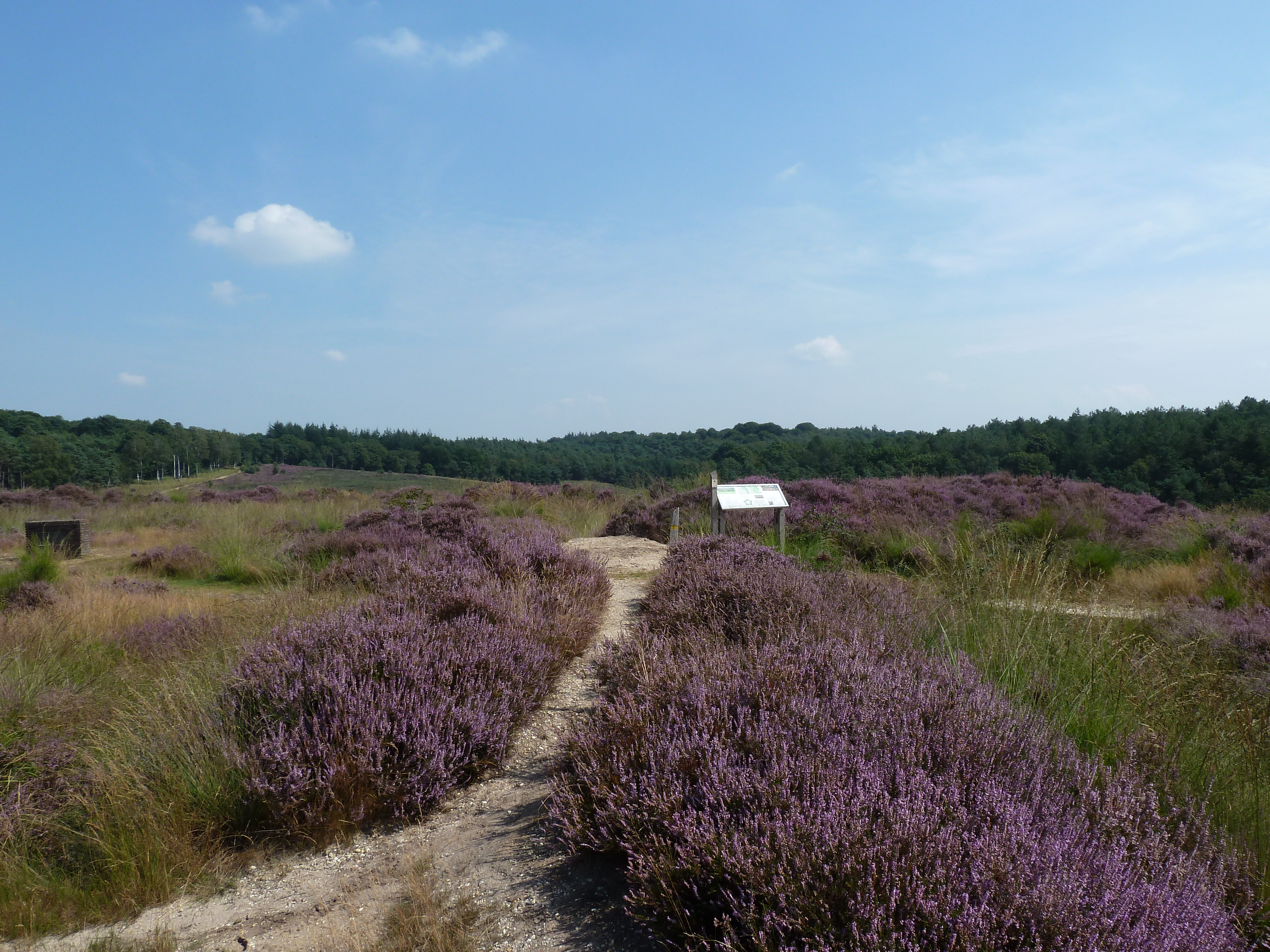
Mook-Heumense schans

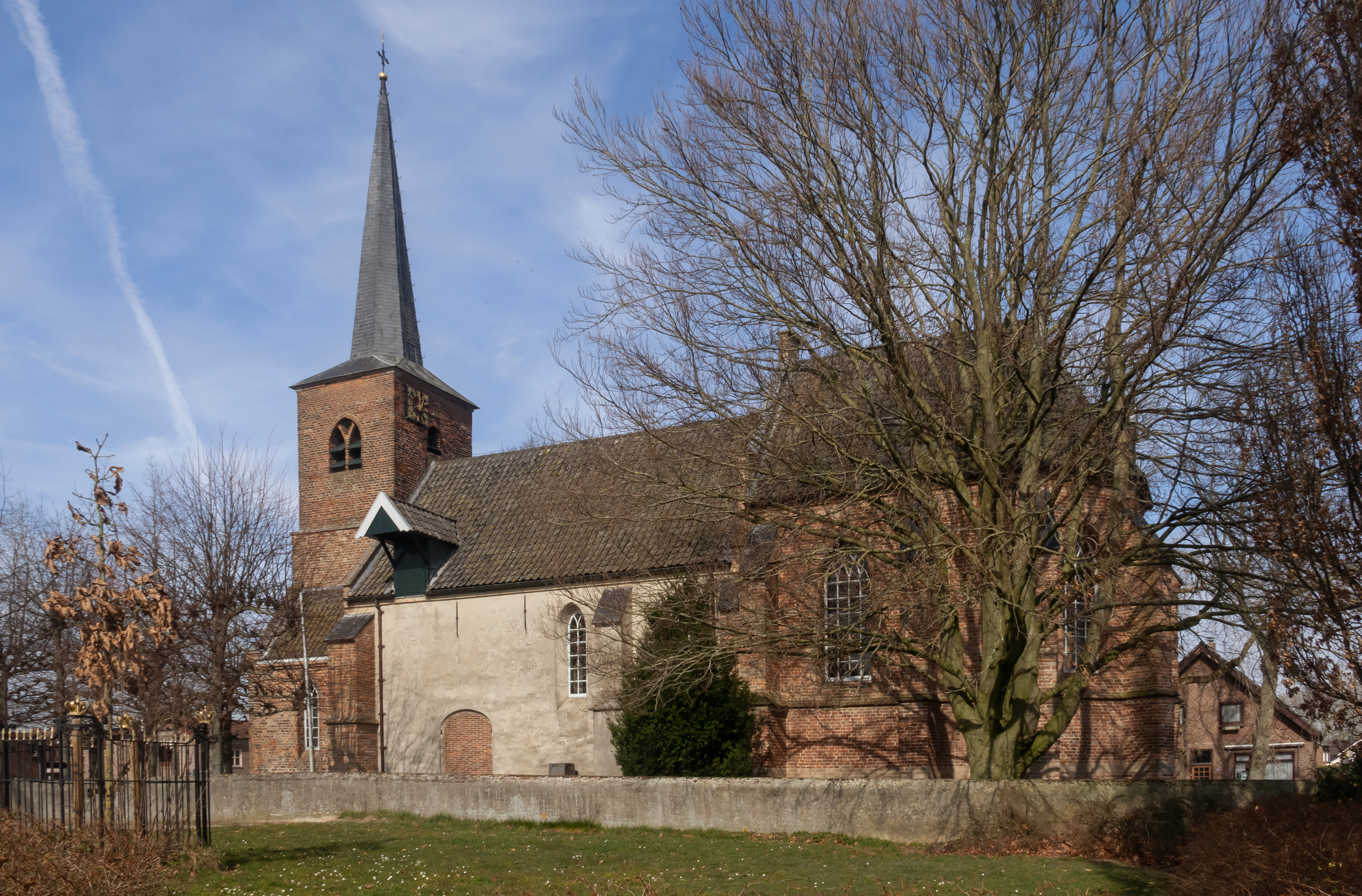
Heumen, the reformed church

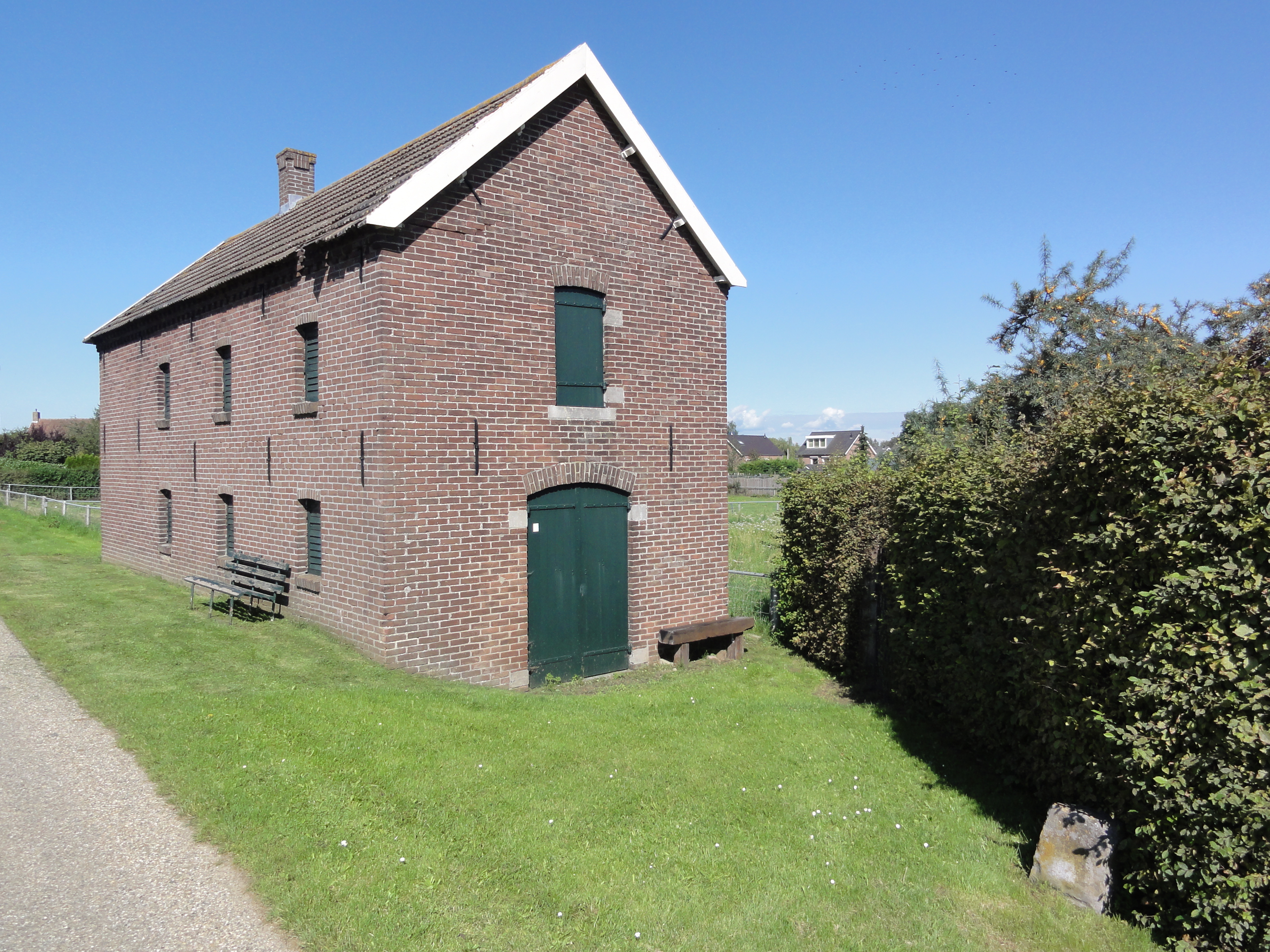
Nederasselt (Heumen, Gld) Dijkmagazijn
