= Ernest Malden =

English cricketer

Ernest Malden (10 October 1870 – 13 September 1955) was an English cricketer. He was a right-handed batsman and a right-arm medium-pace bowler who played one first-class cricket match for Kent County Cricket Club in 1893.

Malden was born in Sheldwich in Kent in 1870. His only first-class appearance was against Marylebone Cricket Club (MCC) in June 1893 at Lord's. His cousin Eustace Malden, played 12 times for Kent between 1892 and 1893 and Eustace's son, Jack Malden, (Note: CricketArchive lists two fathers for Jack Malden: Ernest Malden and Eustace Malden. Jack is also listed as "son" on both of their CricketArchive profiles. The 1901 census lists one William J Malden born in 1899 and living in Sussex with his parents Eustace and Eva in Sussex. It seems reasonable to assume, therefore, that Eustace is Jack's father and Ernest his father's cousin.) also played 24 first-class matches, mainly for Sussex in the early 1920s.

Malden died at Salisbury in Rhodesia in 1955 aged 84.

== Bibliography ==
- Carlaw, Derek (2020). Kent County Cricketers, A to Z: Part One (1806–1914) (PDF). Cardiff: ACS.
