= Overasselt =

- Village
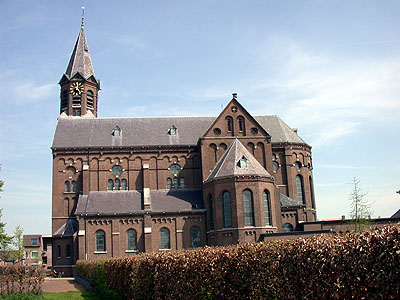
- St. Antonius Abtkerk

- Flag Coat of arms

- Location in the province of Gelderland in the Netherlands Overasselt (Netherlands)
- Coordinates: 51°45′35″N 5°47′15″E
- Country: Netherlands
- Province: Gelderland
- Municipality: Heumen

Area
  - Total: 8.67 km^{2} (3.35 sq mi)
- Elevation: 9 m (30 ft)

Population (2021)
  - Total: 2,270
  - Density: 262/km^{2} (678/sq mi)
- Time zone: UTC+1 (CET)
  - Summer (DST): UTC+2 (CEST)
- Postal code: 6611
- Dialing code: 024

Overasselt (Dutch pronunciation: [oːvərˈʔɑsəlt, -ˈrɑsəlt]) is a village in the Dutch province of Gelderland. It is located in the municipality of Heumen.

== History ==
The village was first mentioned in the 13th century as Asle, and means "upper open forest with ash (Fraxinus excelsior) trees". "Over" (upper) has been added to distinguish it from Nederasselt. Overasselt developed in the Early Middle Ages on a ridge. The village used to be concentrated around the former Dutch Reformed church.

The former Dutch Reformed church was built in 1710 using material from its 15th-century predecessor. The Catholic St. Antonius Abt Church was built 1891. Near the village are the ruins of St. Walrick, a 15th-century Benedictine priory which used to belong to the Abbey of Saint-Valery-sur-Somme, France.

Overasselt was home to 146 people in 1840. Overasselt was a separate municipality until 1 July 1980, when it was merged with Heumen.

A shootout occurred in Overasselt on September 1, 2026, when police came under fire after responding to reports of armed men wearing balaclavas approaching a house in the village at 4 a.m. A 51-year-old security guard was killed in the shooting, and two police officers were injured. Thirty-five people were arrested by Dutch police in the days following the shooting, including Dutch, Belgian, French, and Algerian nationals. The shootout is reportedly linked to Dutch drug lord Jos Leijdekkers.

== Notable people ==
- Alexander Kops (born 1984), Dutch politician

== Gallery ==
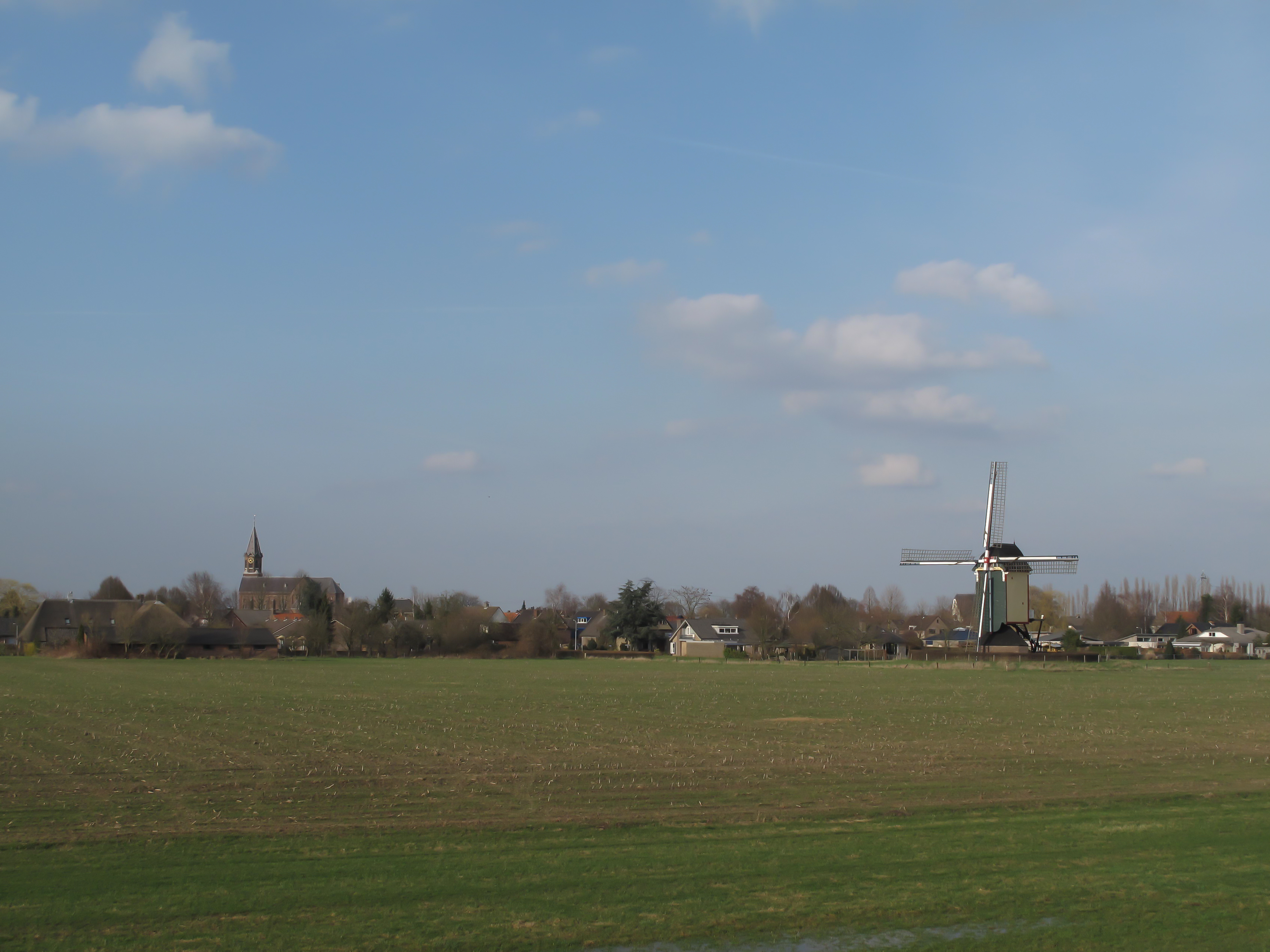
Overasselt, view to the village

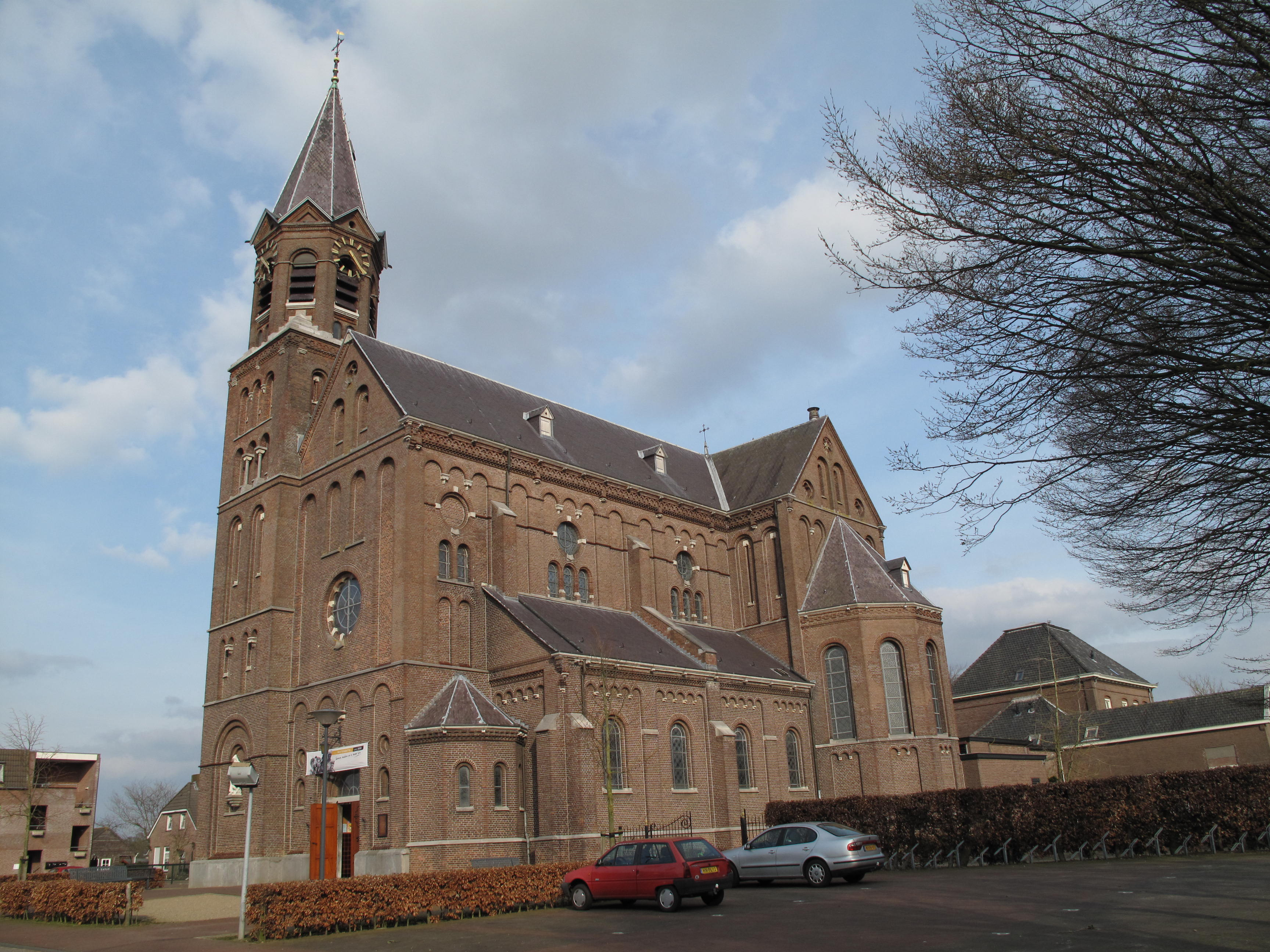
Overasselt, church: Sint Antonius Abtkerk

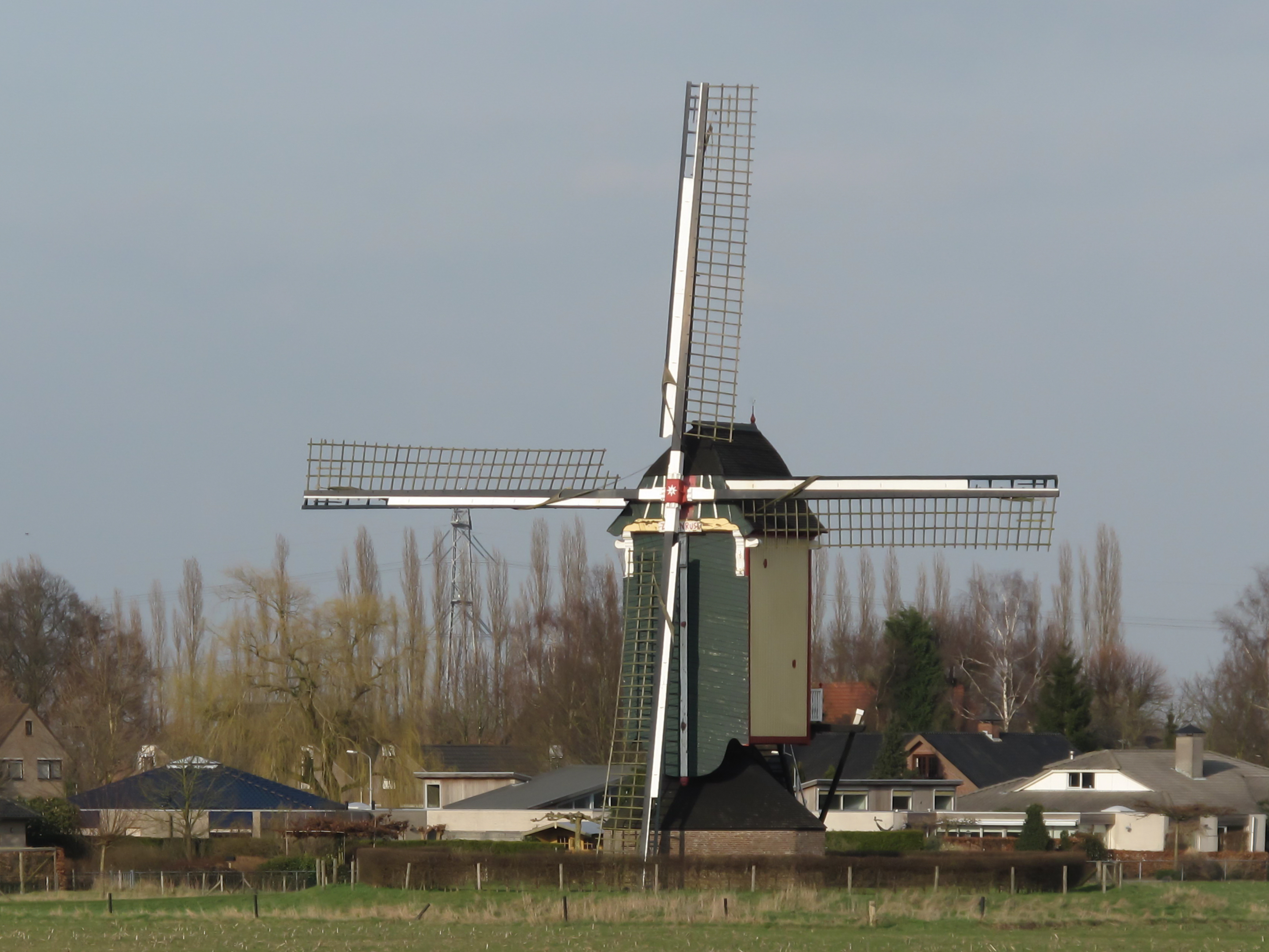
Overasselt, windmill: molen Zeldenrust

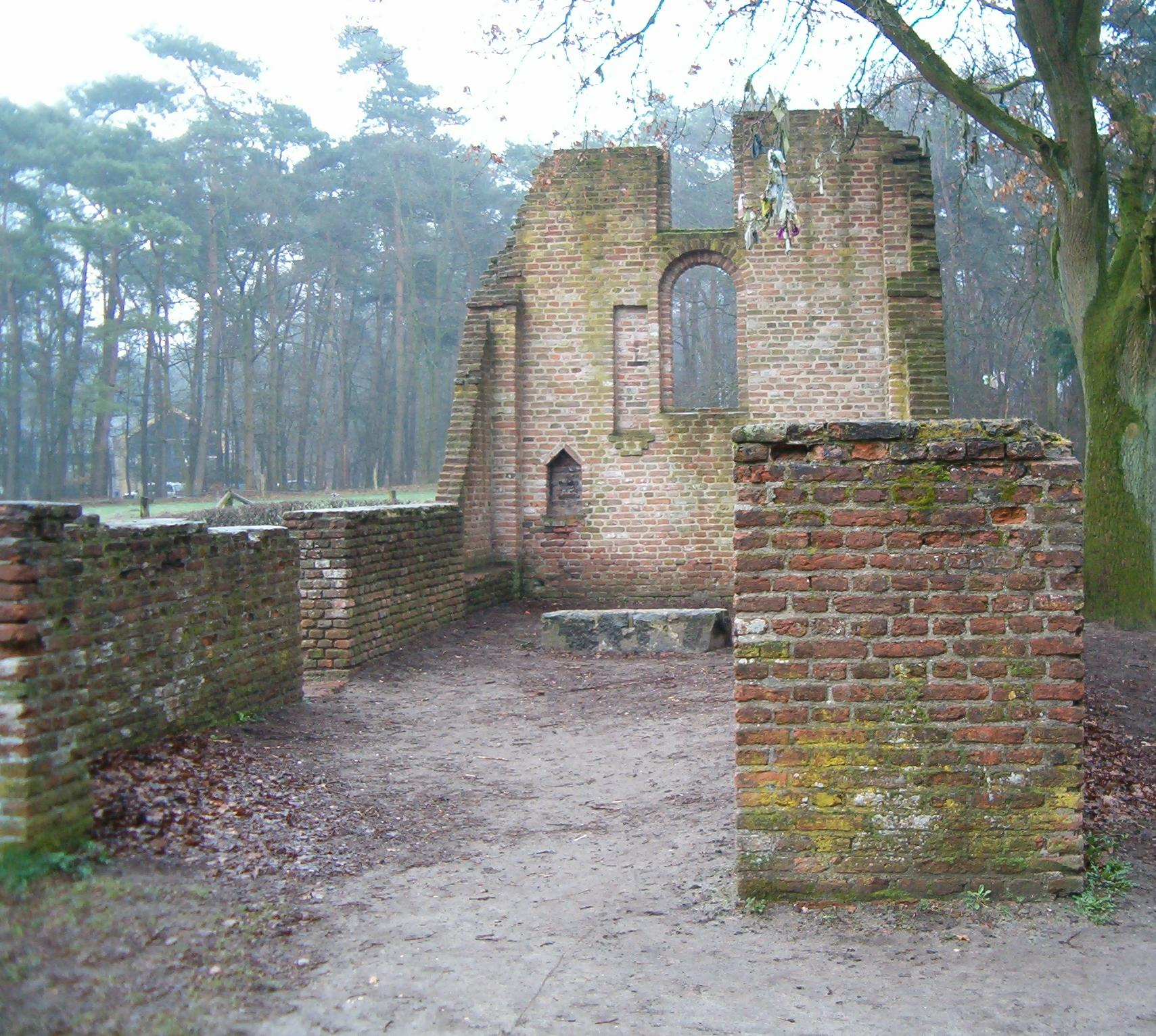
Ruins of St. Walrick
