= Maldon (disambiguation) =

Maldon is a town in Essex, England.

Maldon may also refer to:

== Places ==
- Maldon District, a non-metropolitan district based in Maldon, Essex formed in 1974
- Maldon Rural District, a former district of Essex, abolished in 1974
- Maldon (constituency)
- Maldon, New South Wales, a rural locality in Australia
- Maldon, Victoria, "Australia's First Notable Town"

== Other ==
- "Maldòn", a 1990 song recorded by Zouk Machine
- Maldon Sea Salt company, sea salt produced in Maldon, Essex
- Maldon & Tiptree F.C., an English football club formerly known as Maldon

== See also ==
- Battle of Maldon, between English and Viking forces in 991 AD
- Malden (disambiguation)
