= John S. Thompsonbrug =

John S. Thompson Bridge John S. Thompsonbrug
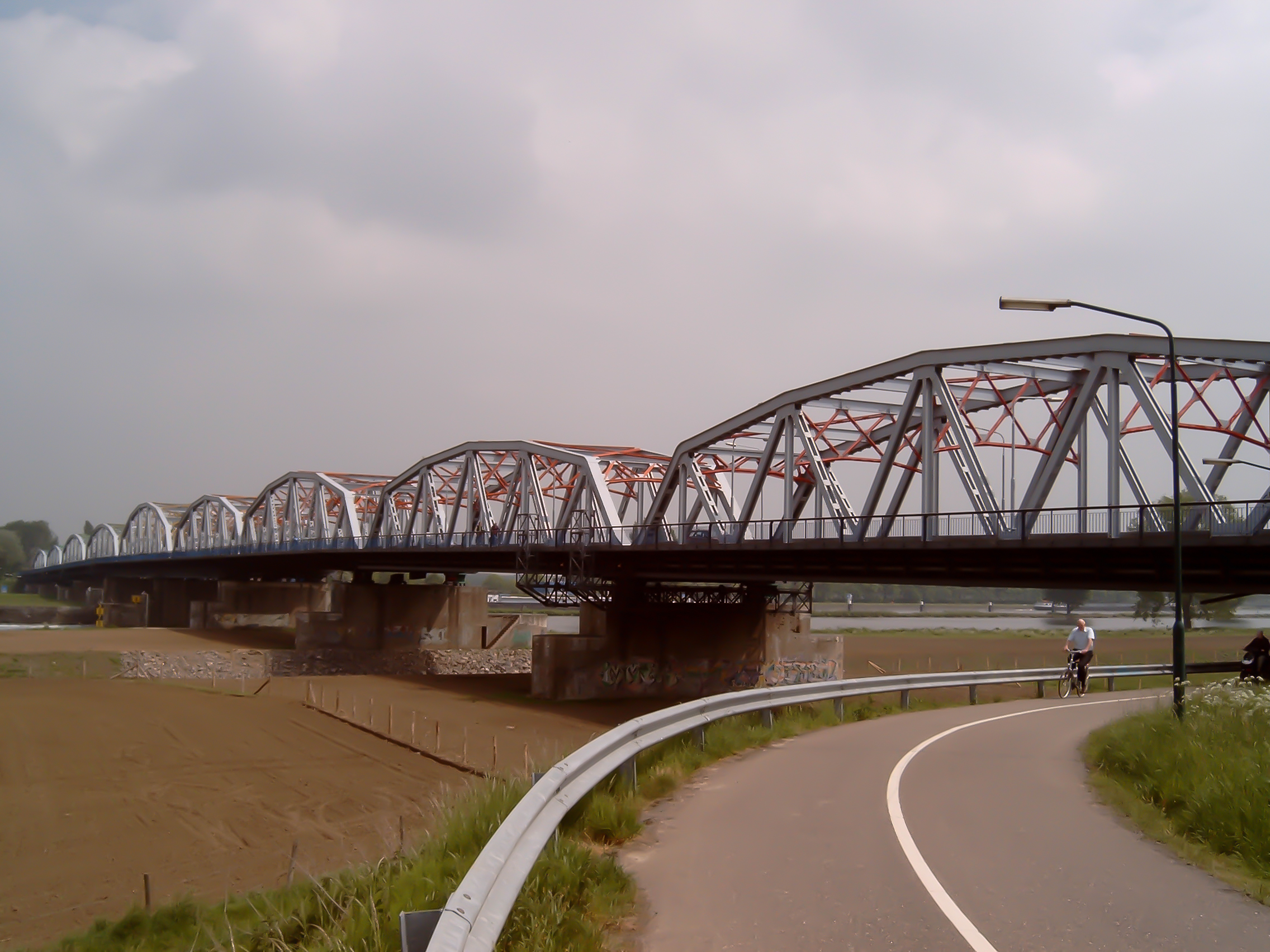
- Coordinates: 51°46′09″N 05°44′10″E
- Carries: Provincial route N324
- Crosses: Maas River

History
- Opened: 1929

Location
- Interactive map of John S. Thompson Bridge

The John S. Thompsonbrug is a bridge over the Maas River between Grave and Nederasselt in the Netherlands.

== Construction ==
The bridge was built in 1929 as part of the main road between 's-Hertogenbosch and Nijmegen. It still carries that road, now signed provincial route N324.

== Capture by Allies during World War II ==
In 1944, as a first lieutenant, John S. Thompson led his men during an air raid as part of Operation Market Garden. The light in the jump bay of the platoon's C-47 Skytrain came on later than expected, moving their landing zone from its intended location near Grave, North Brabant; the plane was passing over buildings when the paratroopers were signalled to leave the aircraft, and Thompson decided to wait until reaching several approaching fields.

Thompson led his platoon in an attack against the nearby bridge spanning the Maas River, which was defended by German forces supplemented by two 20 mm flak guns, one on the near side of the bridge and one across the river. The platoon opened fire on the German forces, killing four. Two trucks of German soldiers arrived on the scene, but they "showed no desire to fight... [and] ran away". Thompson's platoon destroyed "electrical equipment and cables that they expected were hooked up to demolitions", and their bazooka operator destroyed the nearer flak gun, permitting the establishment of a roadblock on the bridge while waiting for the remainder of the 82nd Airborne.

== Renaming ==
Having had no official name, the bridge was renamed in 2004 to John S. Thompsonbrug in honor of Thompson's platoon's capture. Many veterans of World War II, as well as Thompson's wife, attended the ceremony.

== Gallery ==
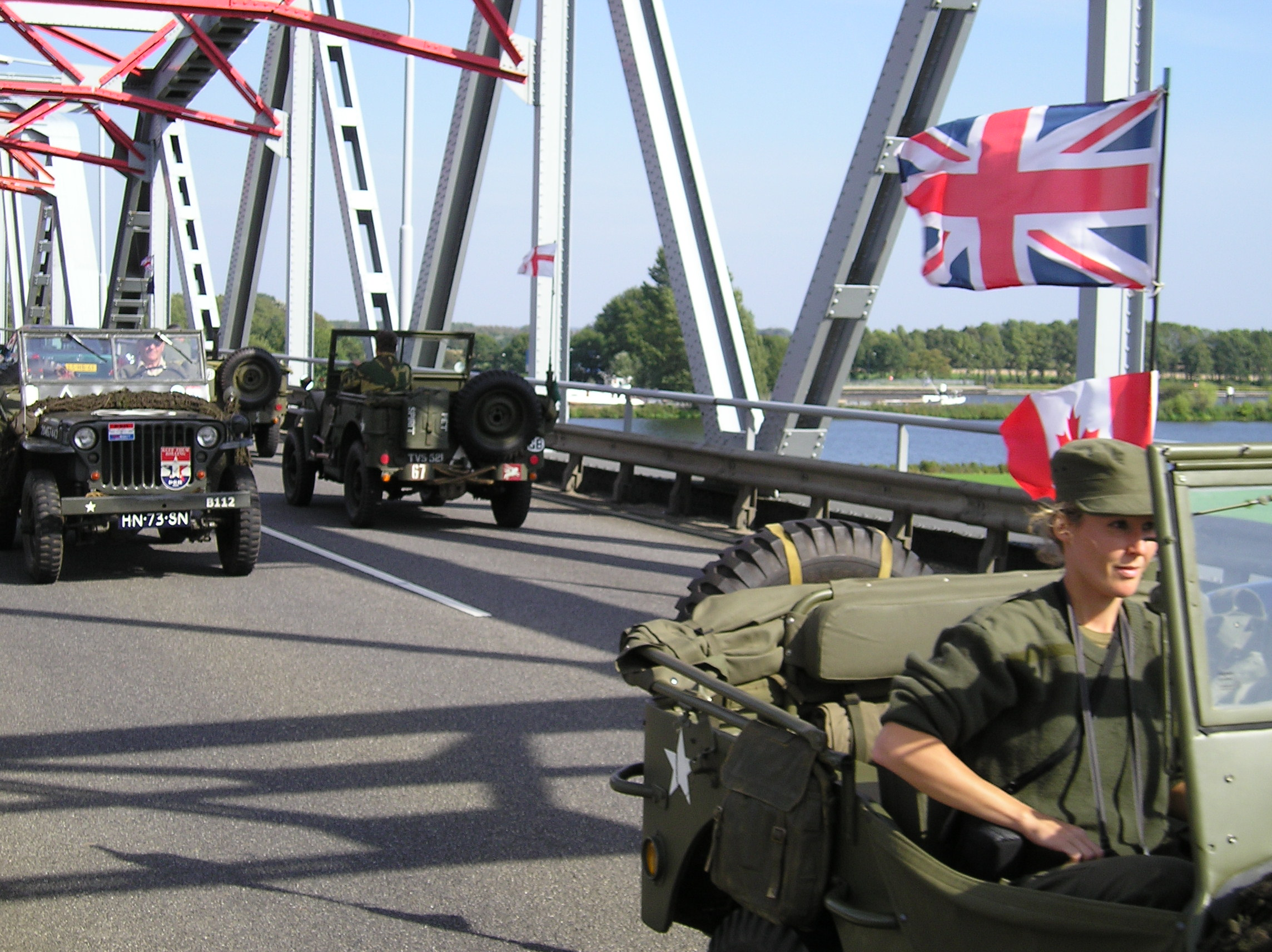
The bridge being crossed by military vehicles

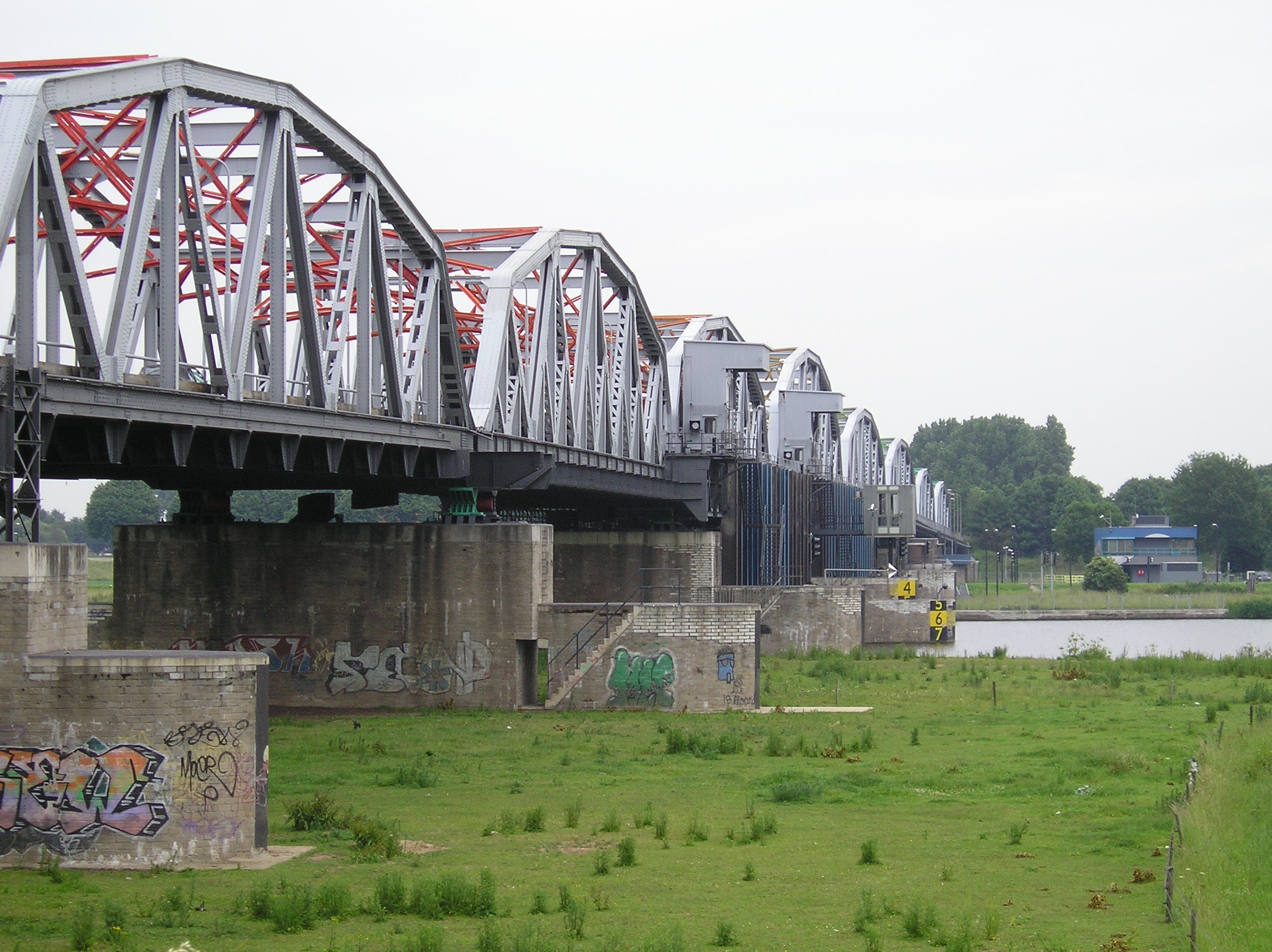
A view from ground level

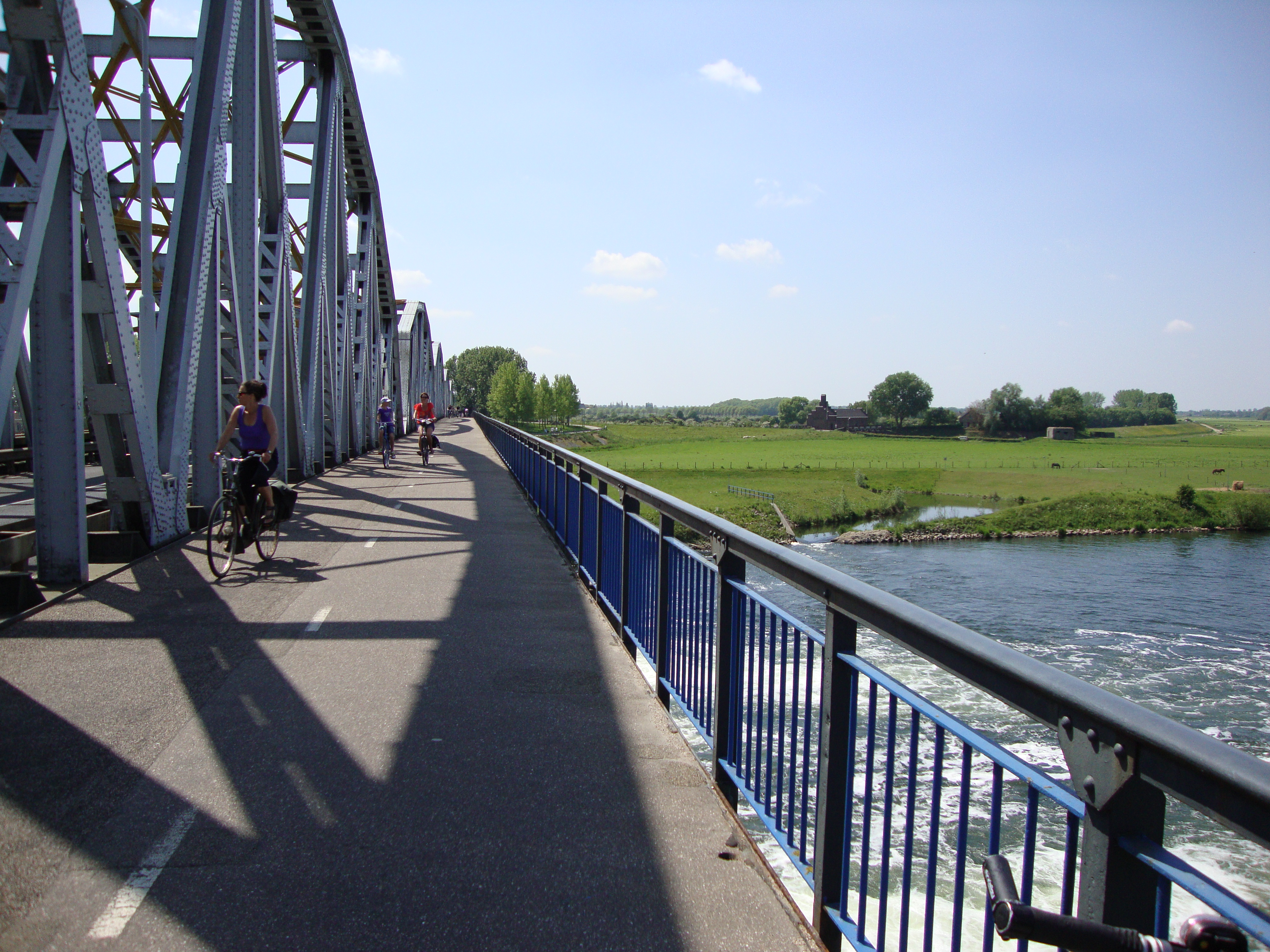
Cyclists crossing the outside lanes

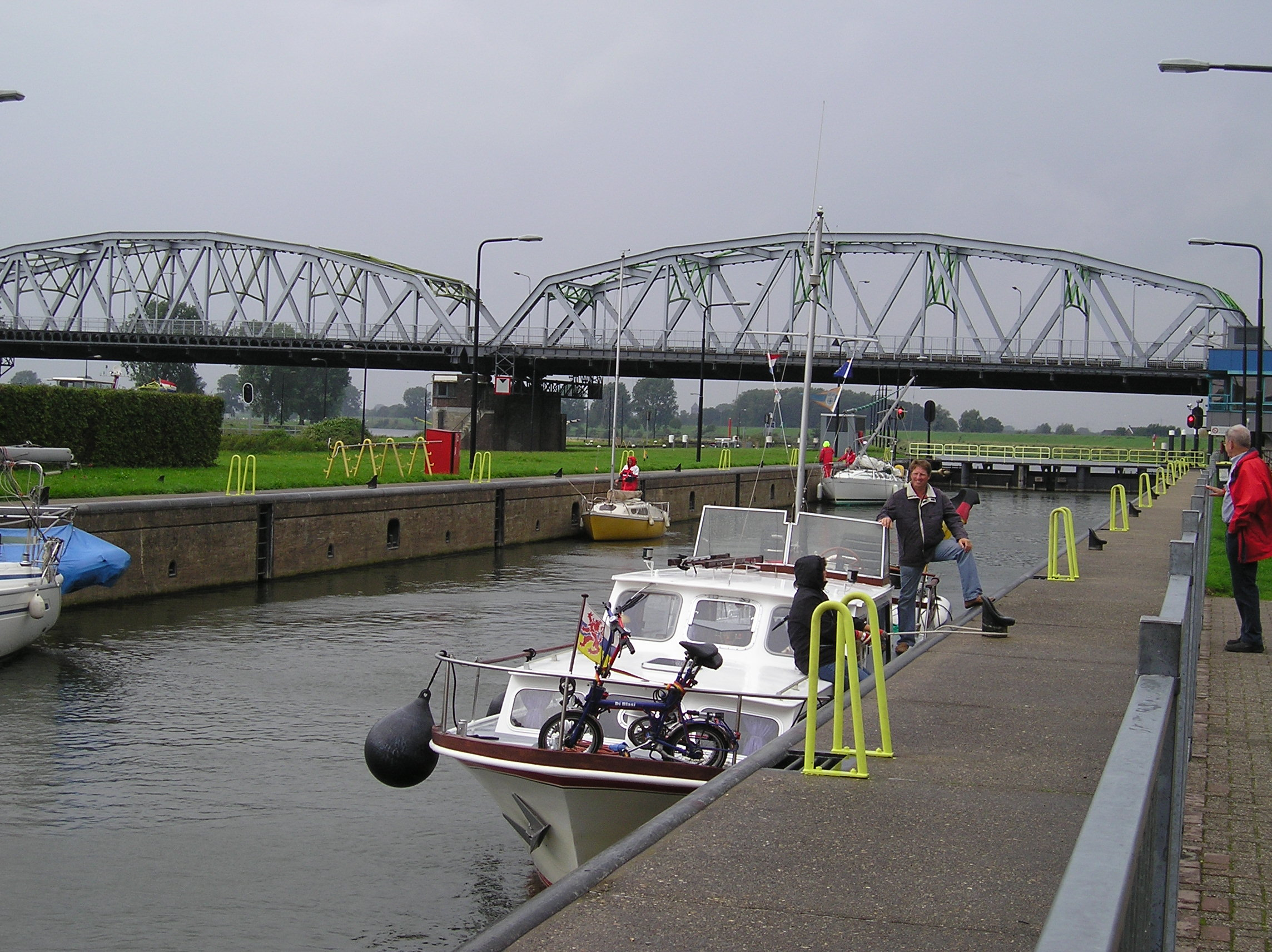
The current lock in the canal under the bridge

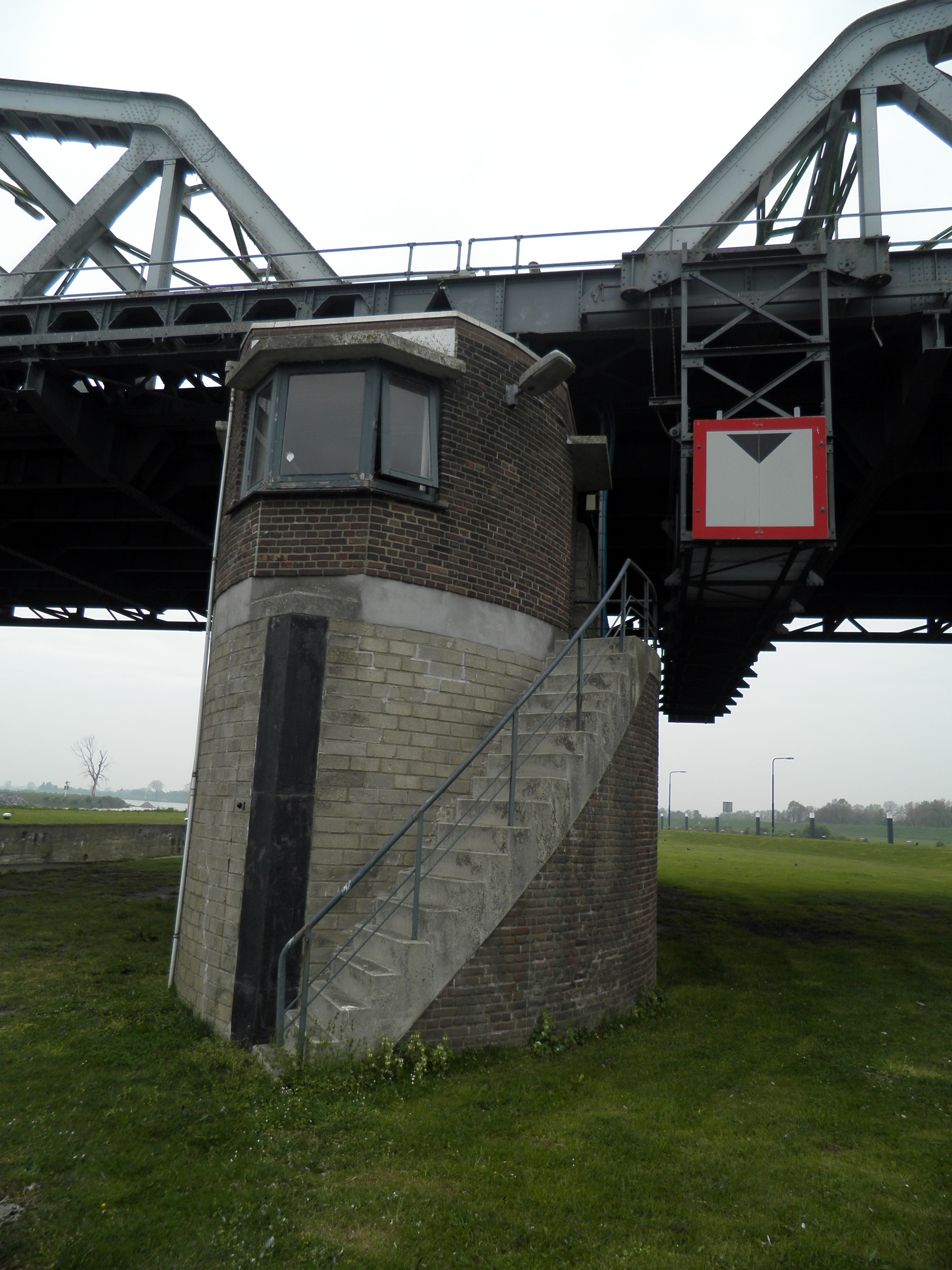
Old canal lock - Control room in bridge

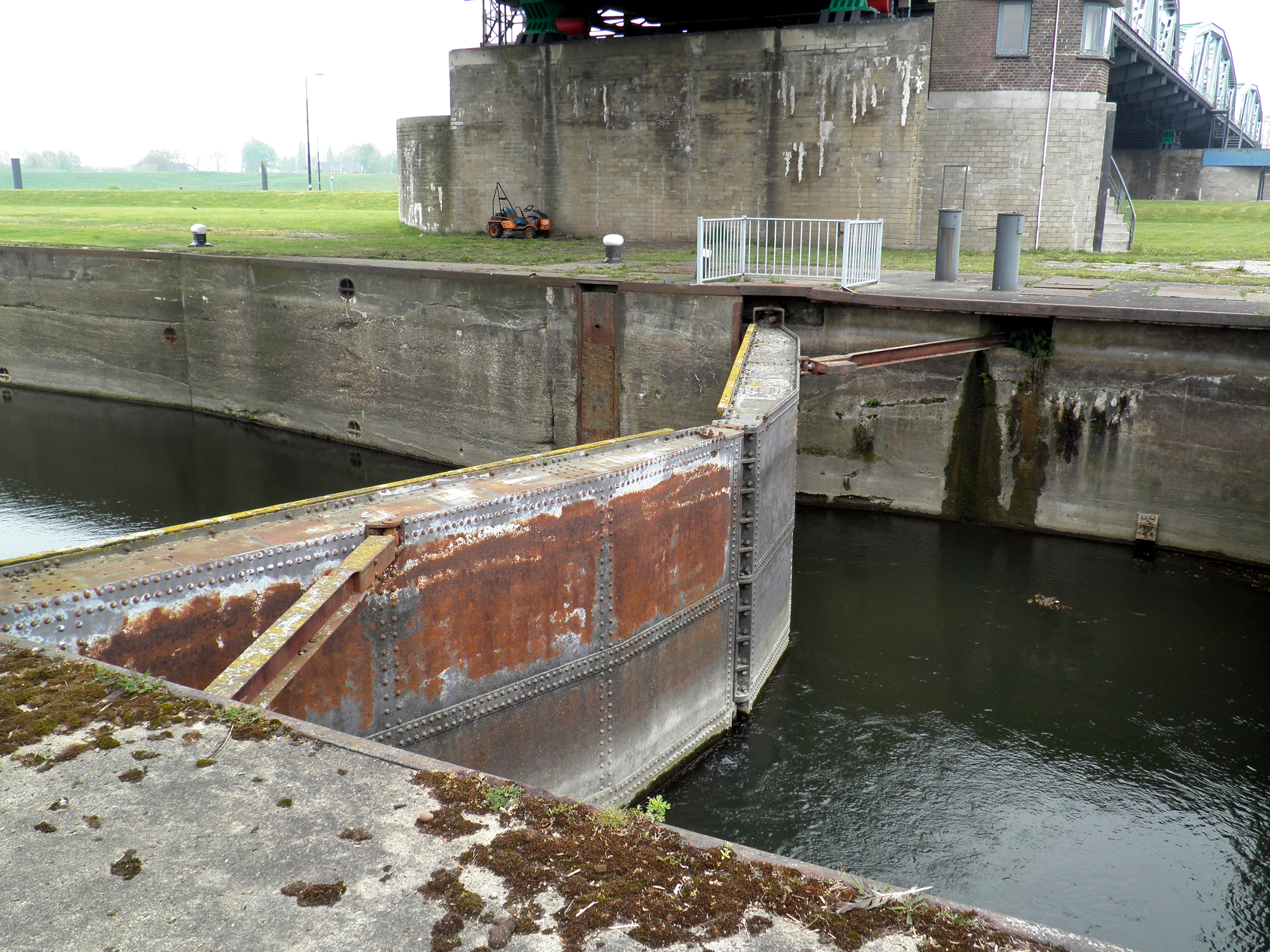
Old canal lock in the canal under the bridge
