= Selena (Dutch singer) =

Dutch singer

Sabina Brons (born 9 August 1965), known professionally as Selena, is a Dutch singer. She released the album Timebomb in 1989, and had three hit singles in her homeland with "Shotgun", "Timebomb" and "So Far Away".
