= Cwmni Theatr Ieuenctid Maldwyn =

Cwmni Theatr Ieuenctid Maldwyn (English: Maldwyn Youth Theatre Company) are a music and theatre group based in mid Wales.

The group, who perform predominantly in the Welsh language, are known for their performances of new music theatre works such as Myfi Yw and Pum diwrnod o rhyddid, produced by Linda Gittins, Derec Williams and Penri Roberts.

Many of the shows produced have been featured on the Welsh television channel S4C.
