= Malden Hollow =

Valley in Missouri, United States

Coordinates: 36.8356099°N 91.0381841°W

Malden Hollow is a valley in Carter and Ripley County in the U.S. state of Missouri.

Malden Hollow was named after Ennis and John Malden, early settlers.
