= Malden, Netherlands =

Malden
- Town
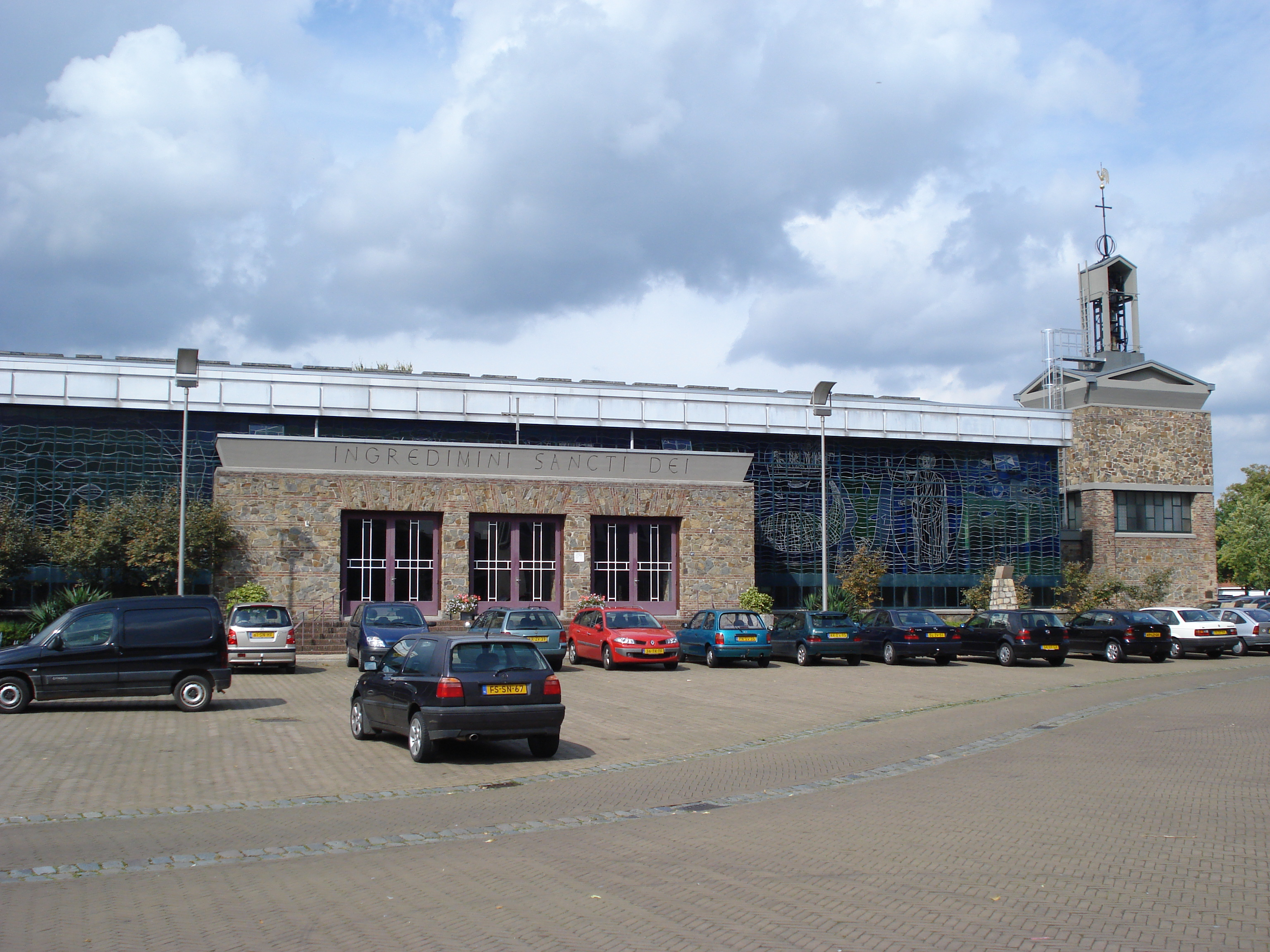
- The plaza in front of the church

- Flag Coat of arms

- Location in the province of Gelderland in the Netherlands Malden (Netherlands)
- Coordinates: 51°47′N 5°51′E
- Country: Netherlands
- Province: Gelderland
- Municipality: Heumen

Area
  - Total: 6.01 km^{2} (2.32 sq mi)
- Elevation: 10 m (33 ft)

Population (2021)
  - Total: 10,930
  - Density: 1,820/km^{2} (4,710/sq mi)
- Time zone: UTC+1 (CET)
  - Summer (DST): UTC+2 (CEST)
- Postal code: 6581
- Dialing code: 024

Malden (Dutch pronunciation: [ˈmɑldə(n)]) is a town in the Dutch municipality of Heumen, Gelderland. Malden is located straight to the south of the City of Nijmegen. Malden is also home to the town hall of Heumen. Malden's football club is called SV Juliana '31.

== History ==
The village was first mentioned in 1247 as de Maldene, and means people's meeting / court of justice. Malden developed between the moraine and the river bank in the Early Middle Ages. Later, it developed into a linear settlement along the road (nowadays: N844).

Malden was home to 680 people in 1840, which increased to 10,930 by 2021.
