= Eustace Malden =

English cricketer

Personal information
- Born: 19 August 1863; Brighton, Sussex
- Died: 3 December 1947 (aged 84); Rottingdean, Sussex
- Batting: Right-handed
- Role: Wicket-keeper
- Source: Cricinfo, 11 March 2017

Eustace Malden (19 August 1863 – 3 December 1947) was an English cricketer. He played 13 first-class matches, all but one of them for Kent County Cricket Club, between 1892 and 1893.

Malden was born at Brighton in Sussex in 1863, the son of Clifford and Jane Malden (née Eley). His father was a Rector in the Church of England, serving at St Lawrence's Church in the village of St Lawrence on the Isle of Wight. He was educated at Haileybury College, where he played cricket in the school team in 1881 and 1882, before going up to Trinity College, Cambridge in 1882. He graduated BA in 1885 and became a teacher, working at Bengeo in Hertfordshire until 1888. He played some cricket for Hertfordshire during the late 1880s and also played in minor matches for the Gentlemen of Hampshire in 1885 and Hampshire in 1886.

After appearing on one match for the Gentlemen of Kent in May 1892, Malden made his first-class debut for Kent the following month, playing as their wicket-keeper in a County Championship match at Gravesend against Sussex.

== Bibliography ==
- Carlaw, Derek (2020). Kent County Cricketers, A to Z: Part One (1806–1914) (PDF). Cardiff: ACS.
