= Bijleveld =

Bijleveld may refer to:

== Dutch persons ==
- Ank Bijleveld-Schouten (born 1962), a politician
- Catrien Bijleveld (born 1958), a criminologist and professor
- François Pierre Bijleveld (1797–1878), a politician and mayor
- Joke Bijleveld (born 1940), a Dutch Olympic track-and-field athlete
- Pieter Claude Bijleveld (1828-1898), a politician and mayor

== Dutch families ==
- Bijleveld (Rhoon), a Dutch patrician- and regentenfamily from Rhoon
- Bijleveld (Westfalen), a Dutch patrician- and regentenfamily from Westphalia
