= Veur-Lent =

Island in the Dutch river Waal

Coordinates: 51.8542°N 5.8650°E

Veur-Lent is the name of an island in the Dutch river Waal. It is part of the municipality of Nijmegen, situated in the Lent Quarter, north of both the city center and the main channel of the Waal.

Owing to the threat of dike breaches at high water, it was decided in 1995 that more water would need to flow through the river. Because the sharp bend in the Waal at Nijmegen created a bottleneck and restricted the water flow, a three kilometer long parallel gully, called the Spiegelwaal, was dug at this point. This resulted in the creation of the new island.

These activities were started in 2011 and as a result, the water level was lowered by 30 centimeters.

Various bridges were built to the island. The island can be reached by foot from the Waalbrug (Waal Bridge), Spoorbrug (Railway Bridge), the Oversteek, the Zaligebrug (Zalige Bridge) and the Lentloper. The latter was built at a later point from the side of Lent.

There are plans to build homes and shops on the island in the future. The costs of constructing the island amounted to 350 million euros.
