= Roxane van Iperen =

Dutch writer and jurist (born 1976)

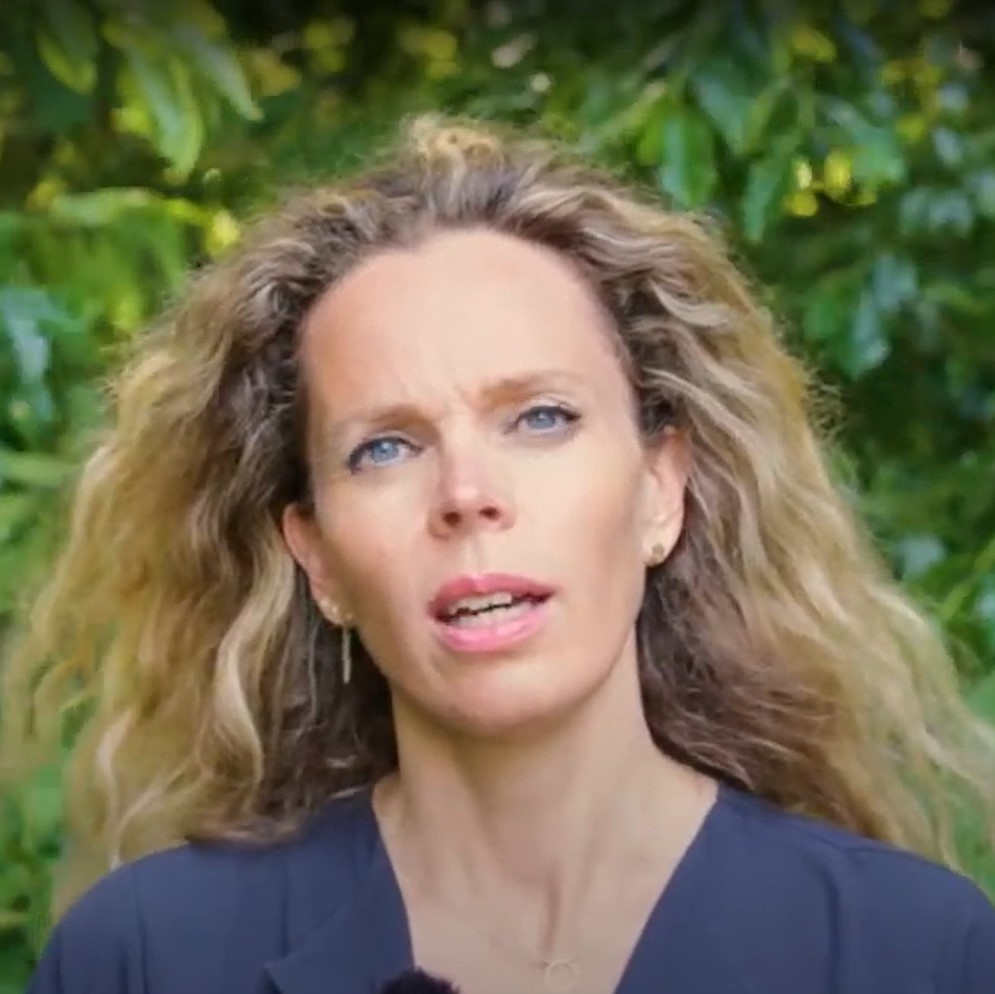
- Roxane van Iperen (2017)
- Born: 11 June 1976 (age 50); Nijmegen
- Education: University of Amsterdam

Roxane van Iperen (born 11 June 1976) is a Dutch writer and jurist.

== Education and career ==
Van Iperen attended English secondary school in the Spanish city Málaga from 1990 to 1992. She then moved back to the Netherlands, where she completed her education at the Gymnasium Beekvliet Sint-Michielsgestel in 1995. She studied law at the University of Amsterdam and followed a professional training in the legal profession. From 2001 she worked as a lawyer at NautaDutilh and in the corporate sector. In 2014 she started a journalistic career as a freelance writer for several Dutch newspapers and weeklies. Her first novel (Schuim der aarde) was published in 2016.

== The Sisters of Auschwitz ==
Van Iperen's novel t Hooge Nest (2018), based on a true story, was translated in several languages, in English as The Sisters of Auschwitz. The book tells the story of two Jewish sisters' resistance in Nazi territory. In September 2021, The Sisters of Auschwitz was number 2 of the 'Nonfiction paperback' bestsellerlijst and number 5 in the 'Combined Print & E-Book' bestseller list of The New York Times; it also was number 15 of the bestseller list of the American Booksellers Association.

== Publications ==
=== In English ===
- Roxane van Iperen: The Sisters of Auschwitz. The true story of two Jewish sisters’ resistance in the heart of Nazi territory (transl.: Joni Zwart). London, Seven Dials, 2020. ISBN 9781841883755

=== In Dutch ===
- Roxane van Iperen: Schuim der aarde. Amsterdam, Lebowski, 2016.
- Roxane van Iperen: 't Hooge Nest. Amsterdam, Lebowski, 2018.
- Roxane van Iperen: Stemmen uit het diepe. Amsterdam, Nationaal Comité 4 en 5 mei, 2021. ISBN 9789059659964
- Roxane van Iperen: De genocidefax. Boekenweek Essay, CPNB, 2021.
- Roxane van Iperen: Brieven aan ‘t Hooge Nest. Amsterdam, Lebowski, 2021.
- Roxane van Iperen: Eigen welzijn eerst. Amsterdam, Thomas Rap, 2022.
