= Roosje Glaser =

Dutch Jewish survivor of the Holocaust

- Roosje during an outing with students from her underground dance school 1942
- Born: 1914; Nijmegen, the Netherlands
- Died: 2000 (aged 85–86); Stockholm, Sweden
- Occupation: Dance teacher
- Known for: Surviving the Holocaust

Rosa (Roosje) Glaser (1914 — 2000) was a Dutch dancer and survivor of the Holocaust.

== Biography ==
Roosje Glaser was born in the city of Nijmegen, Netherlands, and grew up in the small town of Kleef, Germany. Before the Second World War, Glaser was a dance teacher and ran four dance schools. In 1941, she was betrayed by her ex-husband, Leo Crielaars, who informed the Nazis of her Jewish identity. This resulted in her transportation to the Dutch camp Westerbook, the first of seven concentration camps she would be held in. She managed to escape from Herzogenbusch, but was re-captured and was punished by immediate transportation to Auschwitz. Glaser survived by teaching dance to the SS officers.

In 1945, she was liberated by the Swedish Red Cross. She decided to stay in Sweden and lived the remainder of her life there. Her story was published in the book Dancing with the Enemy in 2013, inspired several theatre shows, and was featured in exhibitions.

=== Before the war ===
In 1914, Roosje Glaser was born in the town of Kleef, Germany. Inspired by the dances of the townsfolk, Glaser gained a passion for dancing when she was a toddler. This interest remained with her as she grew, leading her to become a very successful dancer. She performed in various shows in Amsterdam, London, Paris, Berlin, and Brussels.

She was also a successful dance teacher and was the founder of four dance schools. She often introduced dances from abroad, particularly Paris, London, and Brussels, leading to increased publicity. Glaser's picture appeared in several magazines and she was also covered by the Dutch cinema news, leading to her being screened in many Dutch cinemas.

Glaser's first husband died in 1936, and remarried a man named Leo Crielaars, for consolation. Glaser eventually married Crielaars on May 7, 1937. However, tensions began rising in the marriage when the Nazis occupied the Netherlands in 1940. Crielaars began to show Nazi sympathies, despite Glaser's Jewish identity, leading to their eventual divorce.

The Nazi occupation of The Netherlands would lead to the rising of anti-Jewish measures in the country. Glaser, finding the measures interfered with her freedom, decided not to obey them, despite the threat of severe punishment. One such policy mandated that every Dutch person with a Jewish background needed to have a capital 'J' in their passports for indentification. Glaser decided to remove this letter so that she is more easily able to travel and pass through checkpoints. She would also travel to locations that are marked as 'prohibited for Jews' and would ask someone, usually a German, to take her picture. Since Glaser's German was fluent from being raised in Germany, her Jewish identity was undetectable.

=== Betrayal and capture ===
In 1941, Roosje Glaser's now ex-husband Leo Crielaars reports her Jewish identity to the Kulturkammer. She is forced to close her four dance schools immediately. Glaser illegally continues her dance school in the attic of her house. In the spring of 1942, Leo Crielaars and his brother Marinus Crielaars report Glaser to the commissioner of police and the mayor for not wearing a star of David on her clothes. She is consequently arrested and turned over to the SS. She is released from jail six weeks later.

Towards the end of the dance season Roosje Glaser wanted to organize an end-of-season ball. However, due to Leo's and Marinus' betrayal, everybody in town knew she was Jewish. Jews were prohibited from renting out a ballroom. Glaser chose to instead organize an alternative end-of-season ball, hosting a party at a remote recreation area in the countryside with her students.

Shortly after this final ball, she is given orders to report to a Dutch concentration camp, but she refuses. She began working on forging a new identity by stealing a passport from one of her non-Jewish students and sticking her own picture in it. She moves to another town and gets an address from her former lover, Kees, and is able to live in a boarding house owned by a Dutchman who is a member of the Nazi Party. Glaser is however suddenly betrayed by Kees, who tries to steal the cash she has set aside to pay for room and board. Shortly thereafter, Glaser is arrested at gunpoint by a Dutch policeman and eventually transported to the Westerbork transit camp on October 14, 1942.

=== Concentration camps ===
The first concentration camp Roosje Glaser is sent to is Westerbork. After that six more camps follow.

- The Netherlands
  - Westerbork 14/10/1942 – 20/02/1943
  - Herzogenbusch 20/02/1943 – 10/09/1943
- Poland
  - Auschwitz-Birkenau 19/09/1943 – 18/01/1945
  - Death march 18/01/1945 – 22/01/1945
- Germany
  - Ravensbruck 22/01/1945- 15/02/1945
  - Berlin preparing defence works 15/02/1945 – 23/03/1945
  - Bergen Belsen 23/03/1945 – 29/03/1945
  - Neuengamme, department Wansbeck 29/03/1945 – 30/03/1945

Despite the terrible living conditions in the camps, Roosje Glaser tries to remain in charge of her life as much as she can by organizing cabarets and dances. She also writes songs. She manages to escape from Herzogenbusch Concentration Camp but is caught again and as a punishment she is sent to Auschwitz immediately. Roosje Glaser survives by teaching dance to the SS

In Auschwitz she is imprisoned in the building for medical experiments. She is sterilized and when she refuses to undergo more invasive experiments she is punished by being sent to work with the Sonderkommando at the gas chambers. After six weeks of this exhausting and terrifying work, she finds her cousin among the many dead bodies. Her strength disappears and desperate but courageous as she is, she manages to get another job in a grenade factory nearby. Her passion for dance improves her situation. In Auschwitz she teaches dance and etiquette to SS officers. She loses everything except her courage and she remains faithful to her character.

Shortly after her liberation, Glaser writes a letter about the bombings she experienced in Auschwitz: "The most horrendous air raids on Auschwitz, `Breslau, Berlin, and Hamburg left me completely indifferent. After a while I didn't even bother getting up, whether I was in a wooden barrack, the back of a truck or in the open air. While the shrapnel whizzed past our ears we told each other jokes. Why worry about the future? You had to enjoy life in the present, No, life in Germany made me hard and cruel."

=== Liberation dance ===
Relief organisations such as the Swedish, Belgian and French Red Cross were active in Germany towards the end of the war but the Dutch Red Cross was conspicuously absent. Glaser had to pretend she was Danish in order to get some help. She survived on food parcels from the Swedish Red Cross.

In 1945 Folke Bernadotte, chairman of the Swedish Red Cross made a deal with Himmler for a rescue operation of prisoners of the concentration camps. Glaser was exchanged for three German prisoners of war and then the Swedish Red Cross took her to a refugee camp in Sweden. She weighed 35 kilos but recovered fast. In the refugee camp she organized cabaret and dance activities. She also presented a new dance; the Bolero. Glaser called this her Liberation Dance.

When the Dutch Embassy in Sweden urged the Dutch to return to the Netherlands as soon as they felt healthy enough, Glaser wondered if she still sees the Netherlands as her fatherland. She remembered how she was betrayed by her own husband Leo, his brother Marinus and Kees. All of them Dutchmen. She was arrested by the Dutch police and interrogated while employees of the Kulturkammer destroyed her dance schools and was taken to prison and camps. She had worked at the gas chambers and other terrifying places. Following her ordeals, she refused to return to Holland since there was no family left there.

She concealed her tattooed Auschwitz number from others. She went out dancing and making new friends and on 15 February 1946 she married The Swedish Elon Nordström. She manages to preserve her joie de vivre, her passion for dance and music. "From the beginning of my life here in Sweden I always signed my letters Roosje as I used to do, but there is a difference. In the R of Roosje and my official name Rosita, I draw a smiley, a grinning face laughing at life. A snub to those who wanted to intimidate me, to break me. They never succeeded."

In 2000, Roosje died in Stockholm, aged 85.

=== After the war ===
After the war it gradually transpires how many prisoners were killed. Of the twelve hundred people on the train that transported Roosje Glaser from the Netherlands to Auschwitz, seven hundred were gassed on arrival and five hundred were put to work. According to the reports only eight of the original twelve hundred survived. 90% of Roosje Glaser's family was murdered. The percentage of Dutch Jews murdered in the camps was higher than in any of its neighbouring countries, including Germany. Roosje Glaser wrote a long letter to the Dutch government from Sweden. She accused Leo, Marinus and Kees of betrayal. Leo Crielaars was arrested and imprisoned in camp Vught, which was empty at the time and provided a useful prison facility. After an investigation, Leo was found guilty of treason. After serving nine months, Leo was released and was free to continue with his dance school. He died in 1978.

As a result of the information Roosje Glaser had provided, Marinus Crielaars was arrested and imprisoned as well. In addition of his betrayal of Roosje, it transpired that Marius had committed other crimes as well. The judge sentenced him to ten years in prison. The sentence was halved a year later.

These post-war legal processes were launched under the slogan "swift, sever and just", but due to the enormity of this process, the process of Dutch reconstruction and the military actions in Indonesia, swiftness was quickly prioritized over severity and justice.

Kees was also arrested but not only as a result of Roosje's testimony. In addition to treason, Kees was also suspected of fraud and collaboration. When he was taken prisoner by the Allies in Dessau he was in possession of a large sum of money. He was handed over to the Dutch authorities and he too was imprisoned in camp Vught. His interrogation produced a substantial file. Several witnesses characterized him as extremely unreliable. One report mentioned the German execution of a resistance fighter and a crashed English pilot, based on information provided by Kees. In spite of the fact that Kees had persecuted people and had dressed in an SS uniform, the judge found there was insufficient evidence for a conviction. At the request of the defending lawyer a psychiatrist declared that Kees was not entirely sane. He was released and he moved to Germany. Kees died in Cologne in 1996.

A year later, Roosje Glaser wrote in one of her photo albums about her relationship with Leo and Kees: "I met my second misfortune in 1937, namely Kees. Leo and I rented our dance hall from him in Den Bosch. This man is responsible for the entire unfortunate situation that has followed me like a shadow for ten long years. I fell in love with him and he with me. A dangerous game developed involving money, ethics and honour. Everyone lost. All three of us lost love, money and our good reputations. Hate, in the most profound sense, left deep wounds. It was an unforgettable three-sided affair. Now we are all married. I think I am the one who is best off. I want to forget him as one forgets a nightmare. Maturity has helped me succeed".

Roosje Glaser survived both Leo and Kees. In 1947 she visits the Netherlands for the first time since the war. She visits her friends and the former students of her dance school. Her home in the city of Den Bosch where her illegal dance school used to be was destroyed when the British RAF bombed the city in an attempt to liberate it. Shortly before she had to flee in 1942, Roosje Glaser had buried her photo albums and films. She digs them up and takes them back to Sweden.

To Roosje Glaser a person's character was what counted. That was most important to her: character, character, character. The preface to her diary, that she began to write in the SS prison in Den Bosch says: 'Difficulties and risks are the judge of our character'.

== See also ==
- Anne Frank
- Etty Hillesum
- Edith Eger
