= Quack-monument =

Monument in Gelderland, Netherlands

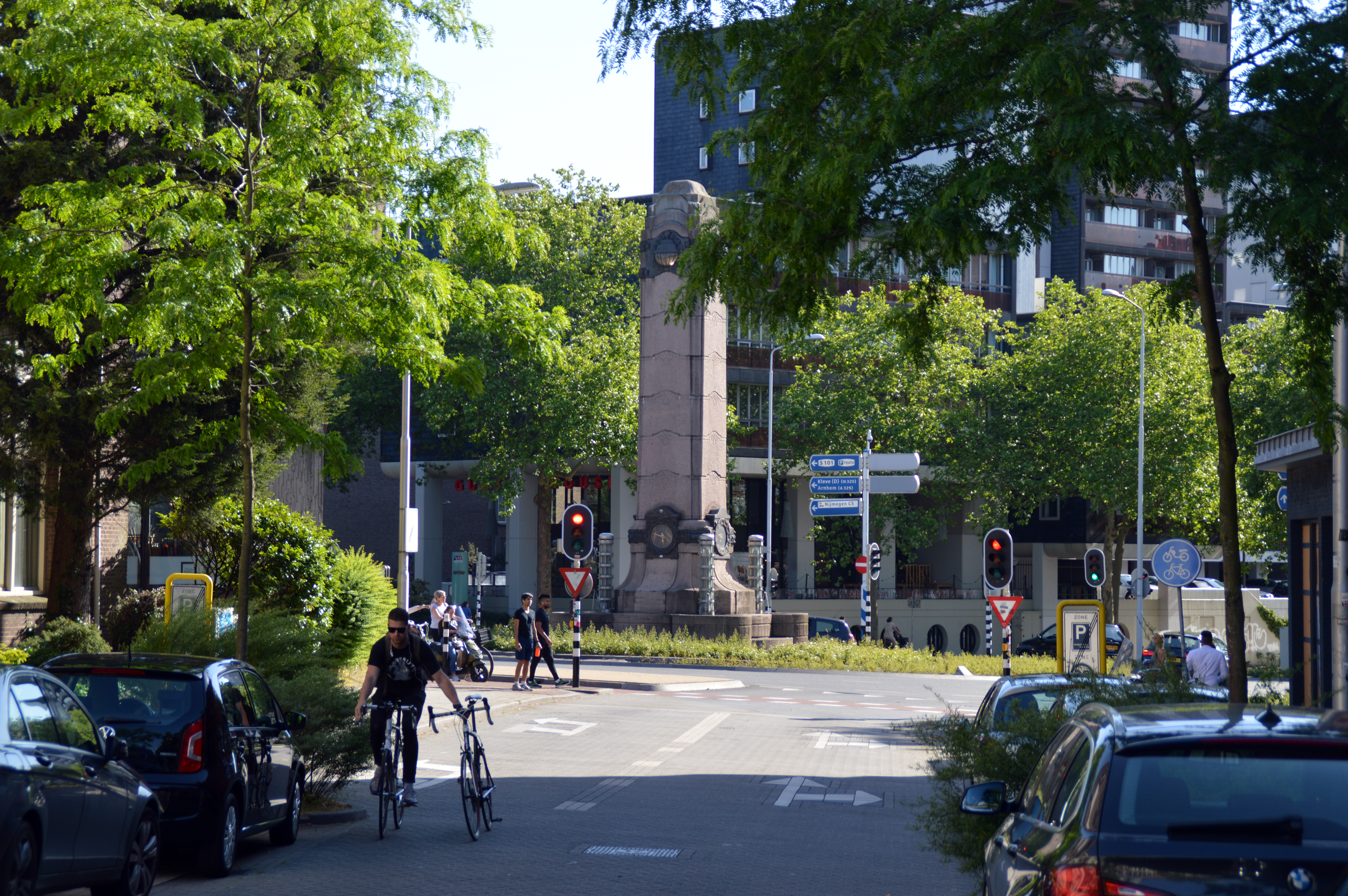
Quack-monument

The Quack monument or Marie-Adolffontein is located in Nijmegen, in the Dutch province of Gelderland.

The Quack monument was originally erected in 1926 from a legacy of Arnoldus Burchard Adolphus Quack (Nijmegen, 6 April 1842 - Nijmegen, 11 November 1920). Quack was alderman of the municipality of Nijmegen from 1902 to 1919. The monument is named after him and his twin sister Maria (Marie) Christina (Nijmegen, April 6, 1842 - Nijmegen, March 15, 1905). Quack left his legacy to the municipality of Nijmegen under the condition that a fountain, the Marie Adolphron named after his sister, would be erected.

Architect Willem Bijlard designed the monument that contains four fountains and four bells at the base and four lanterns at the top. The lower part is made of granito. The obelisk is made of red granite with carved art-deco ornaments. The lanterns and bells are made of bronze. The ornamental surfaces under the bells were made by stonemason Litjes. 75 m3 of granite and 30 m3 of concrete have been processed.

It was demolished in 1958 because it had to give way to traffic. Several parts, such as the glass parts and the bells were destroyed by, among other things, the bombing of Nijmegen in 1944. The different parts were stored for years. In 1976 there was mention of the monument to be erected in the new Dukenburg district. Eventually the monument was rebuilt in 2000 in the same place where it stood until 1958.

The monument is often compared to a phallus. On World AIDS Day 2004 a huge 'condom' was drawn over the monument.

== Gallery ==
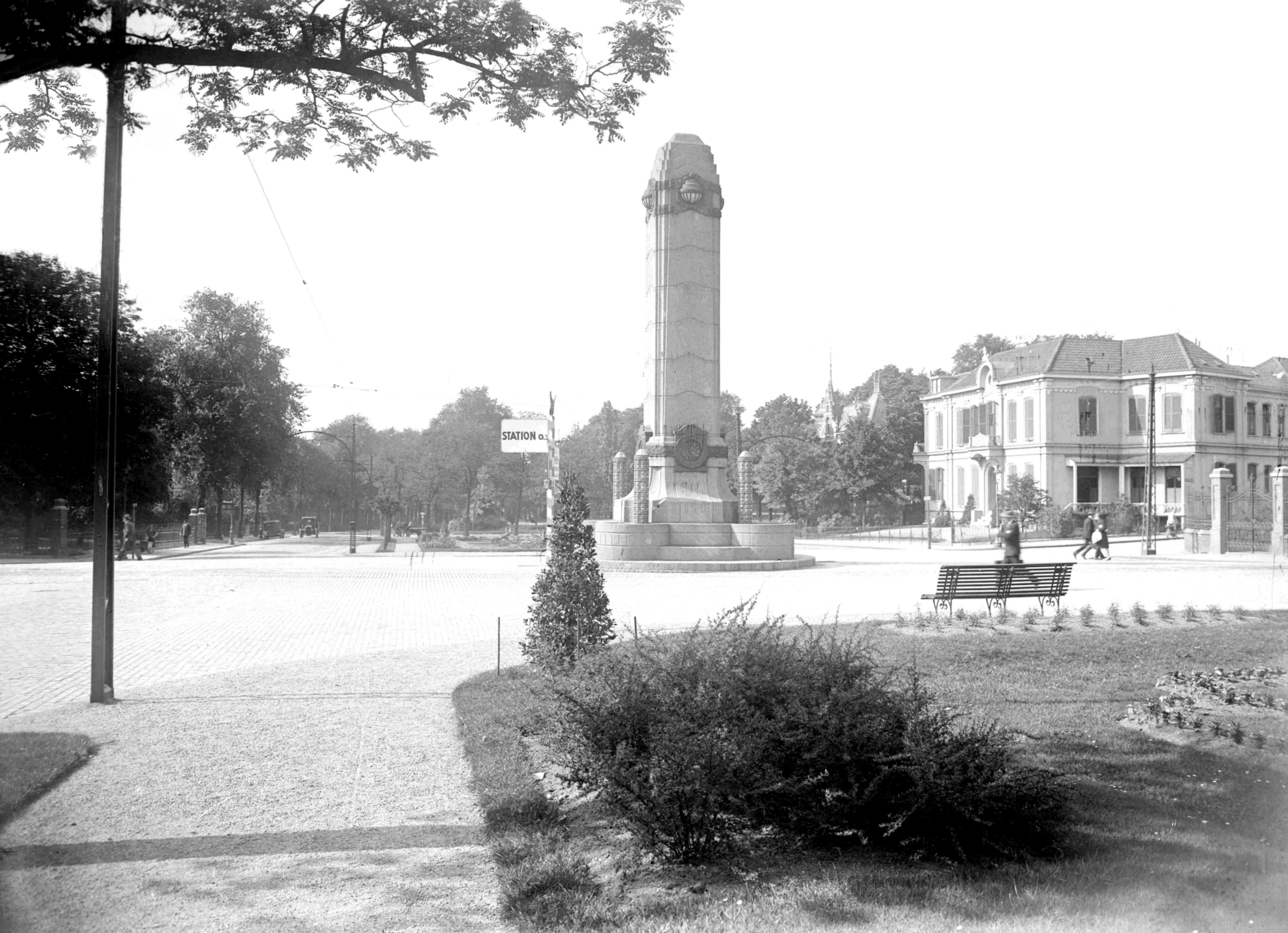
Quackmonument in 1926

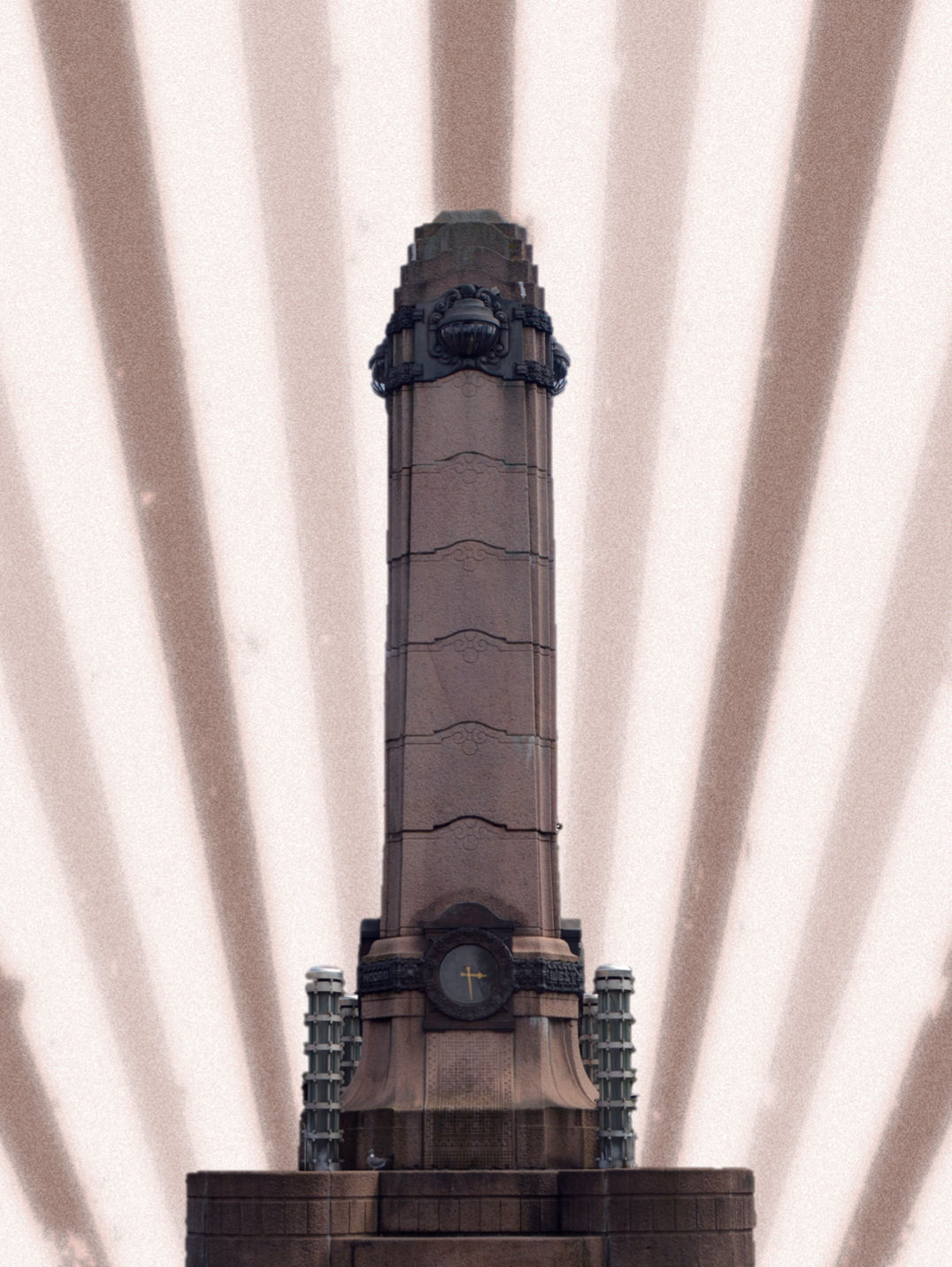
Quack-monument

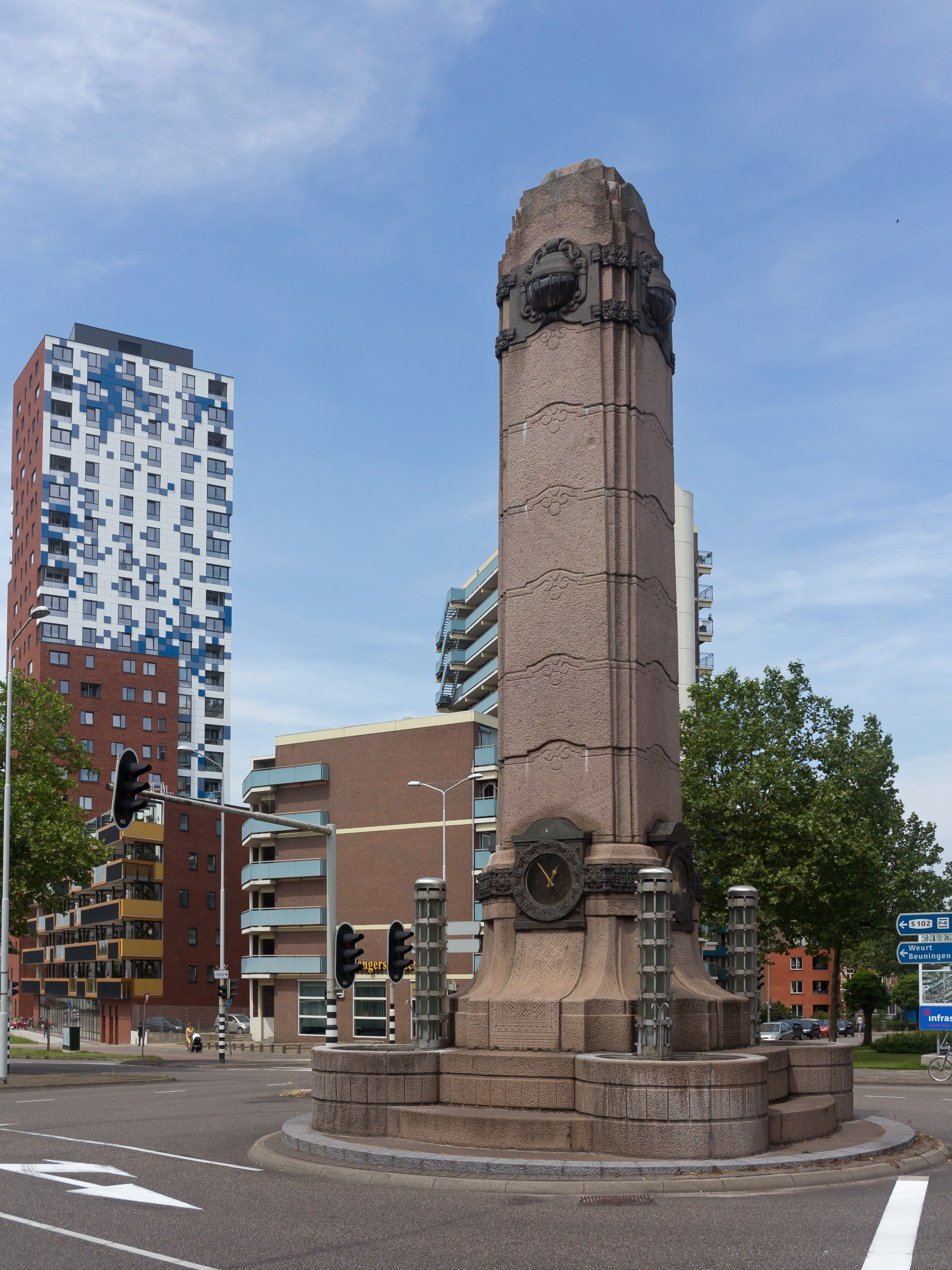

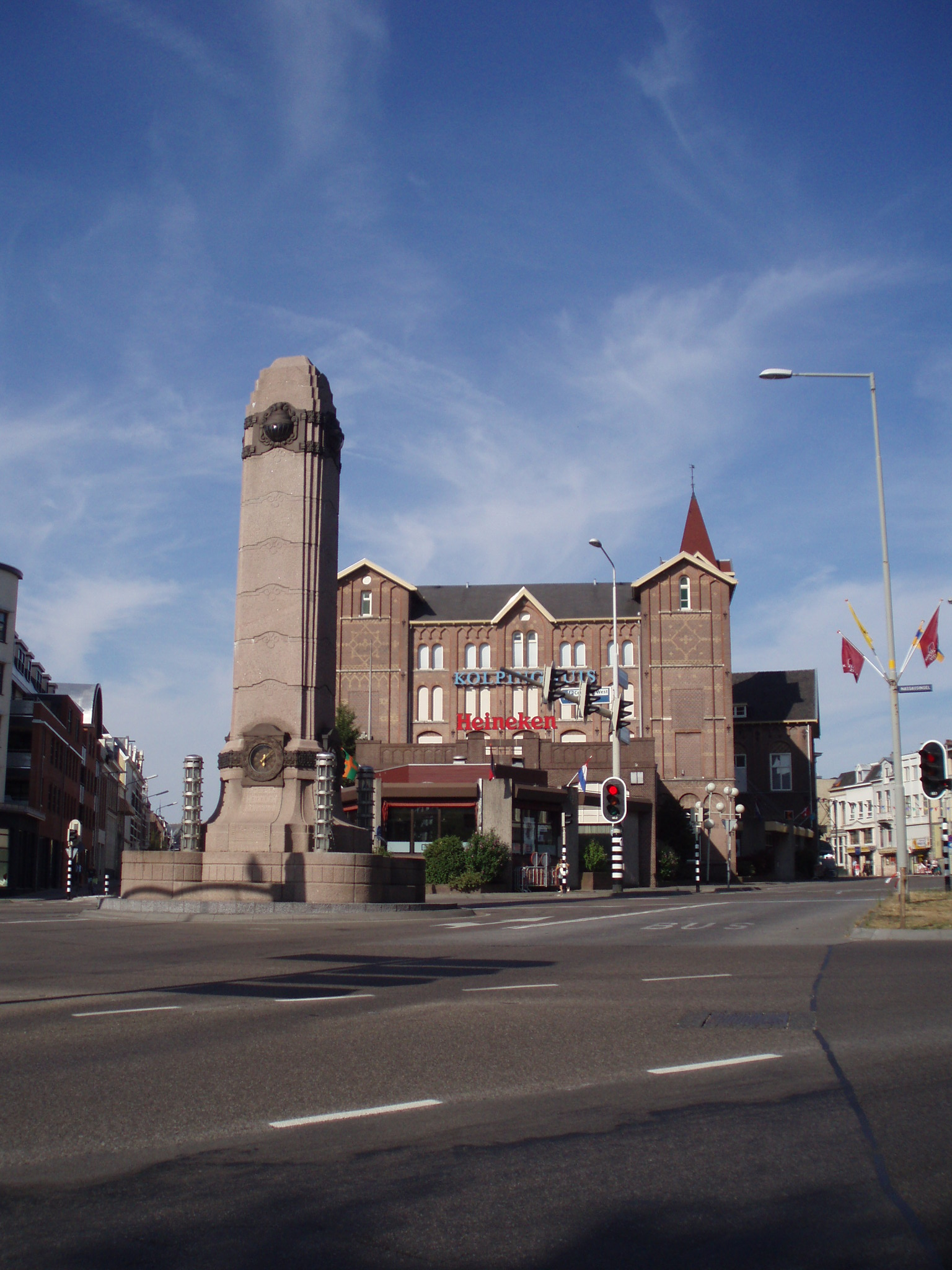
