= Nijmegen =

City and municipality in Gelderland, Netherlands

Nijmegen Nimwéêge (Nijmeegs)
- City and municipality
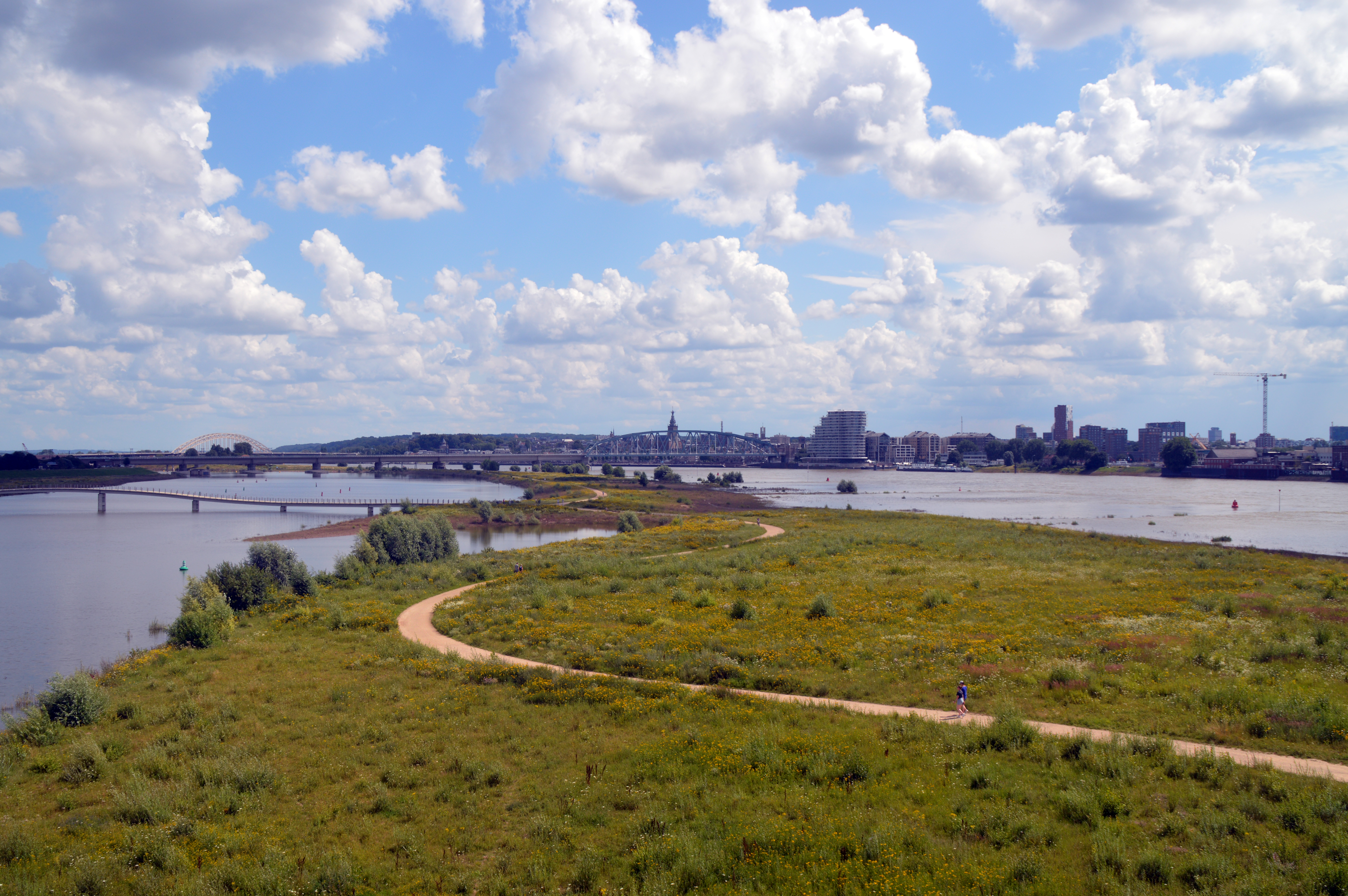
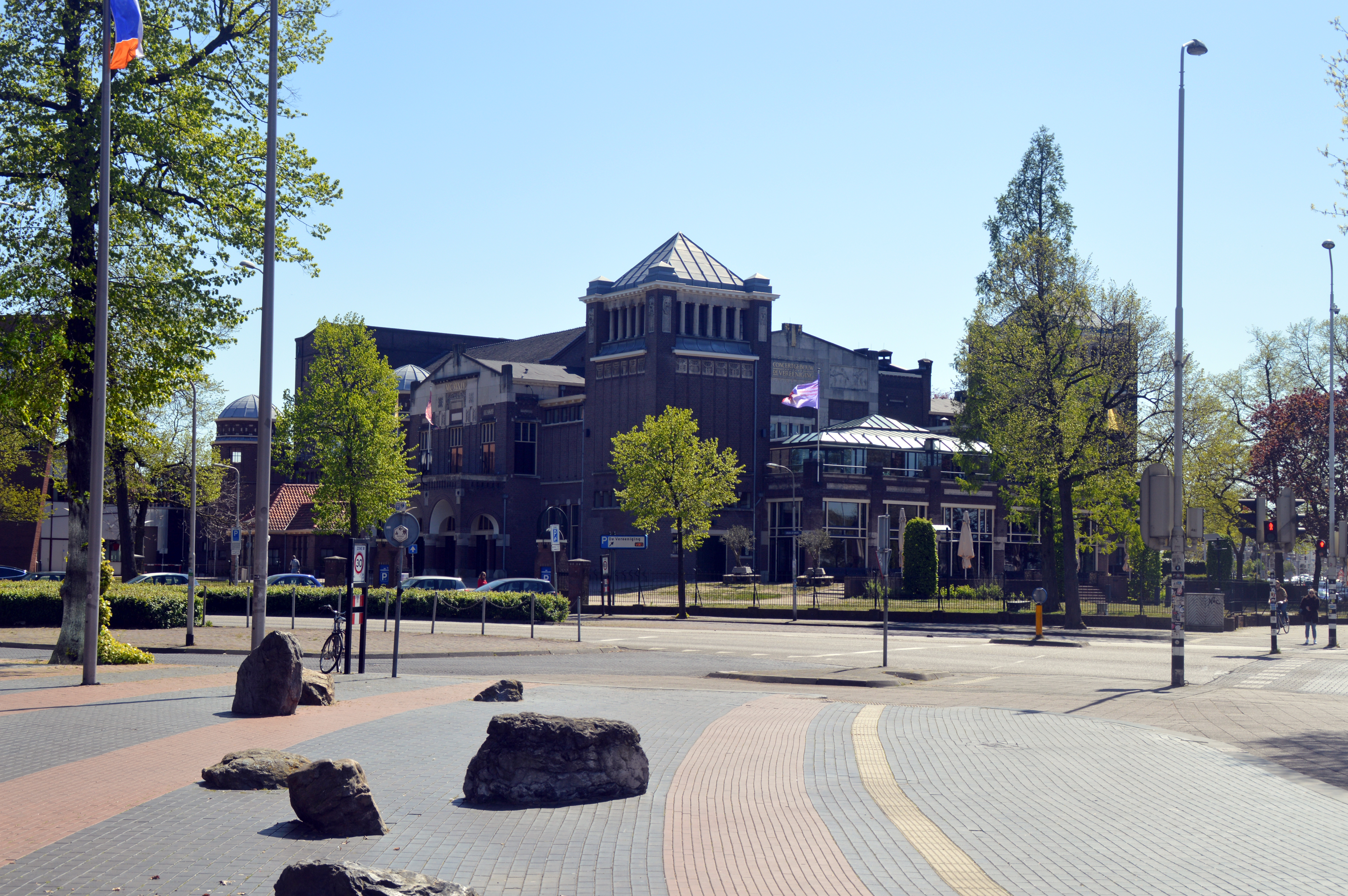
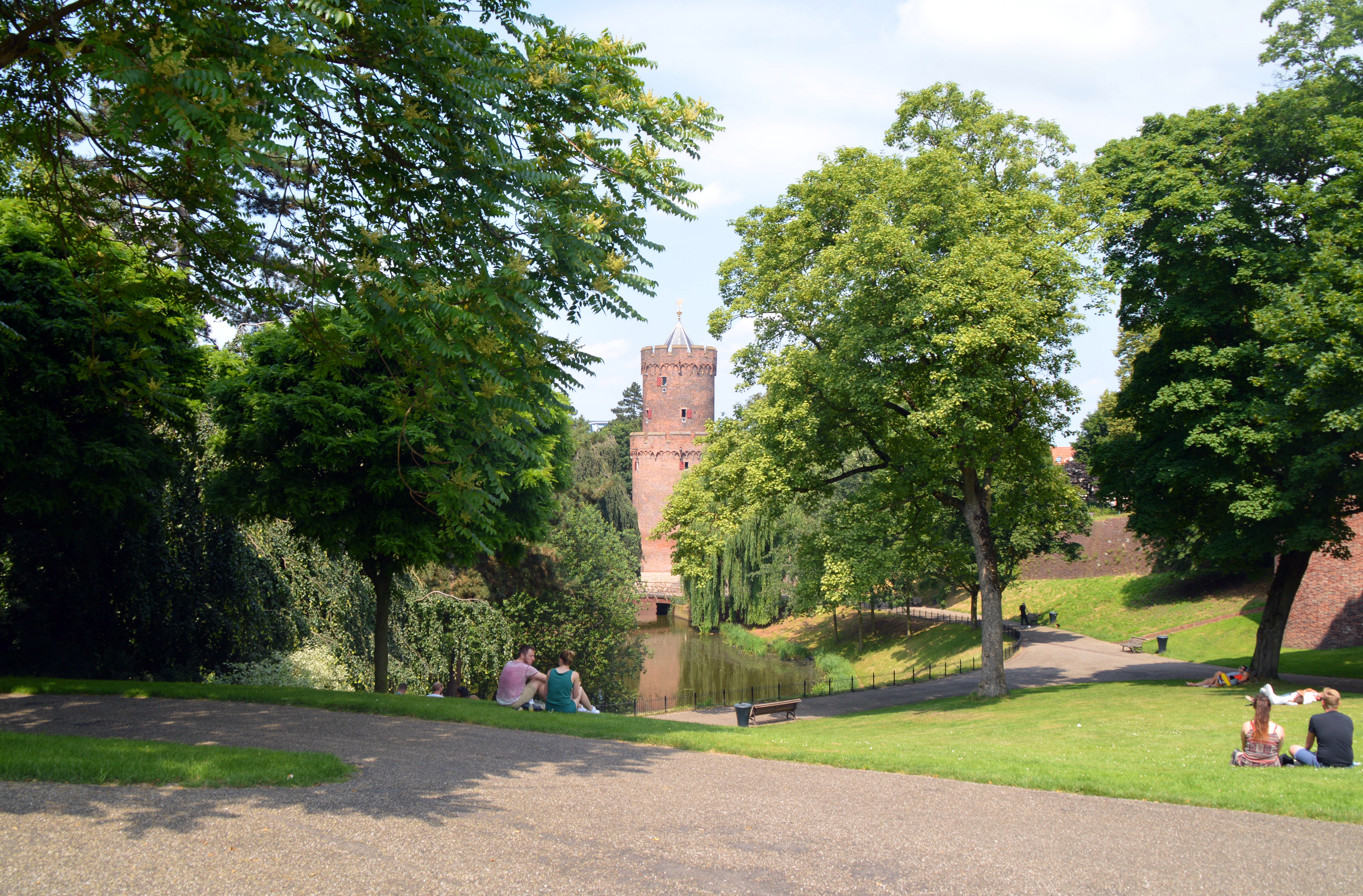
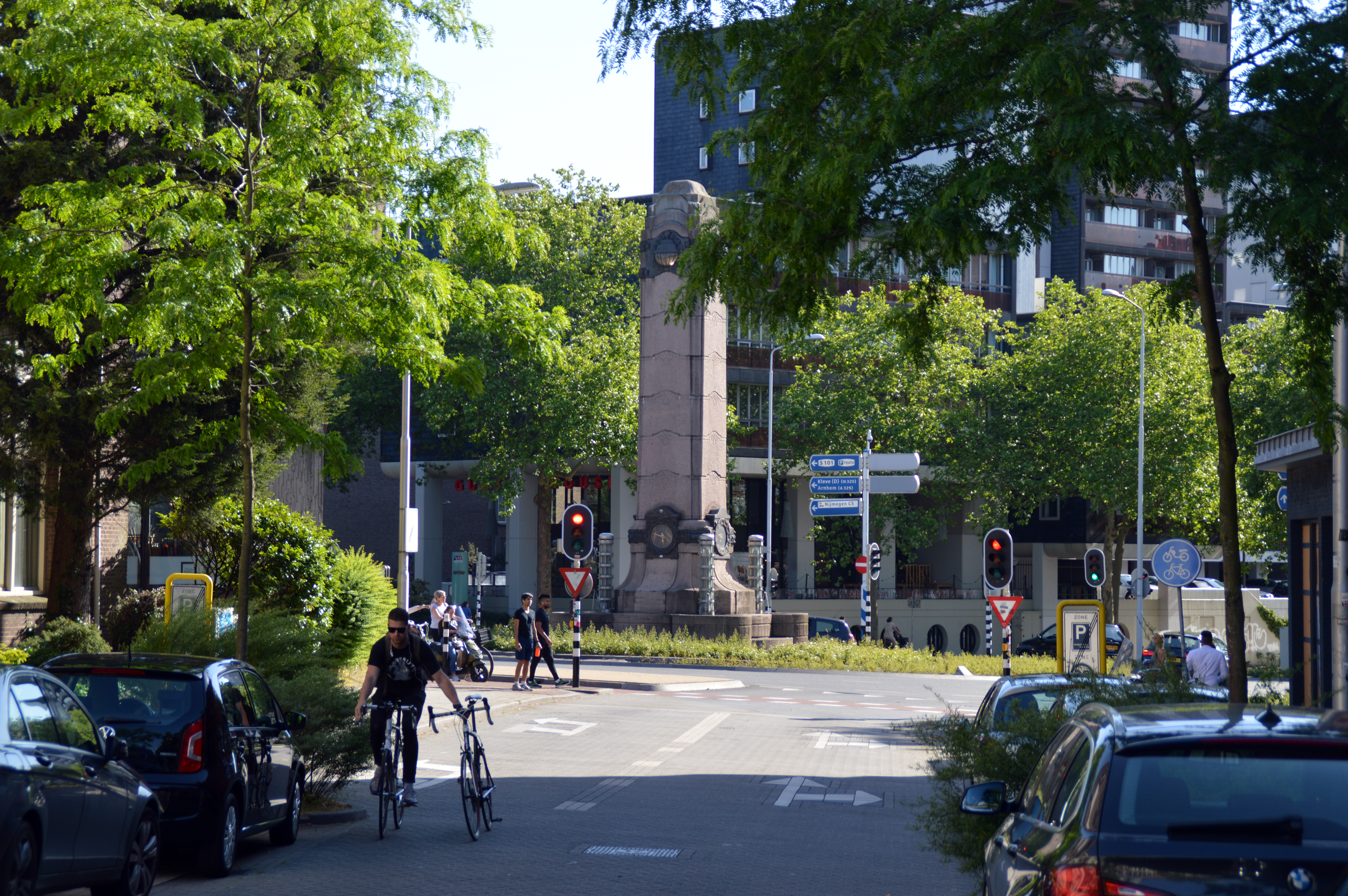
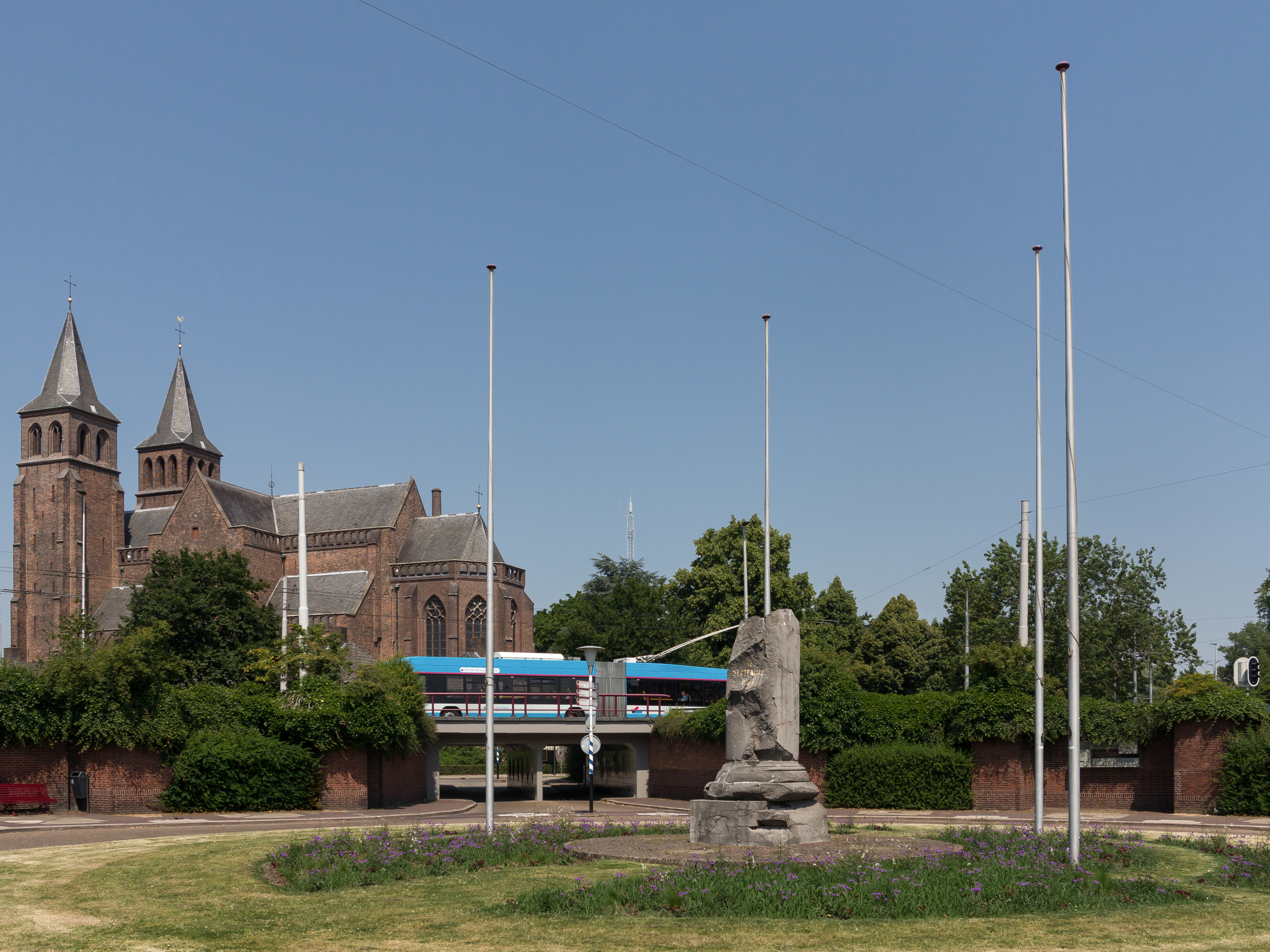
- Skyline Concertgebouw de Vereeniging Kronenburgerpark Quack-monument RijnWaalpad

- Flag Coat of arms Brandmark
- Nickname: Havana aan de Waal (Havana on the Waal)
- Interactive map of Nijmegen
- Location within the Netherlands Location within Europe
- Coordinates: 51°50′51″N 05°51′45″E
- Country: Netherlands
- Province: Gelderland
- Founded: 98, as Novio Magus
- Founder: Trajan

Government
  - Body: Municipal council
  - Mayor: Hubert Bruls (CDA)

Area
  - Municipality: 57.63 km^{2} (22.25 sq mi)
  - Land: 53.09 km^{2} (20.50 sq mi)
  - Water: 4.54 km^{2} (1.75 sq mi)
- Elevation: 29 m (95 ft)
- Highest elevation: 88 m (289 ft)
- Lowest elevation: 7 m (23 ft)

Population (Municipality, January 2026; Urban and Metro, May 2014)
  - Municipality: 189,871
  - Density: 3,576/km^{2} (9,260/sq mi)
  - Urban: 168,840
  - Metro: 801,973
- Demonym: Nijmegenaar
- Time zone: UTC+1 (CET)
  - Summer (DST): UTC+2 (CEST)
- Postcode: 6500–6547, 6679, 6683
- Area code: 024, 0481
- Website: www.nijmegen.nl

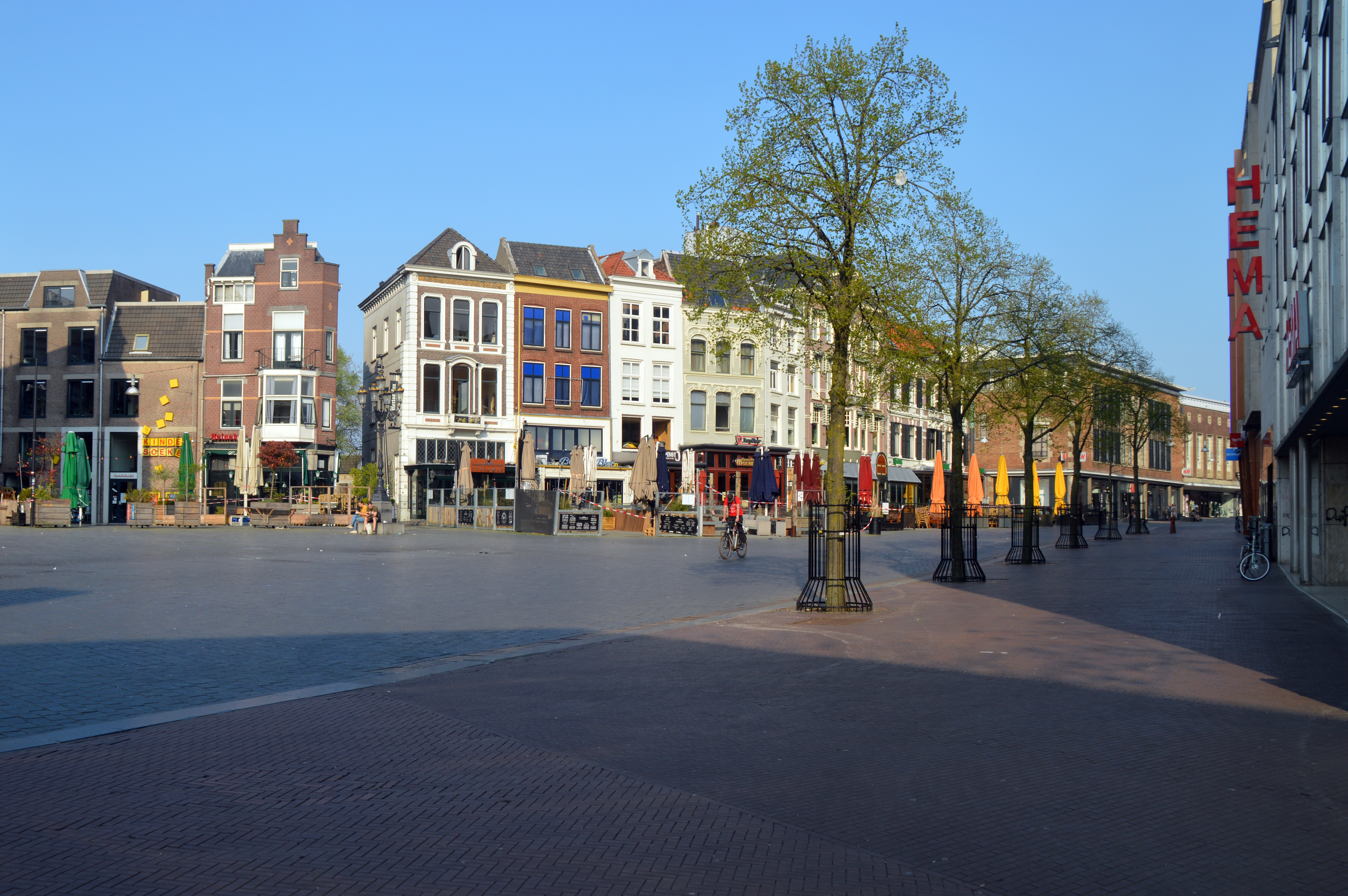
Market square

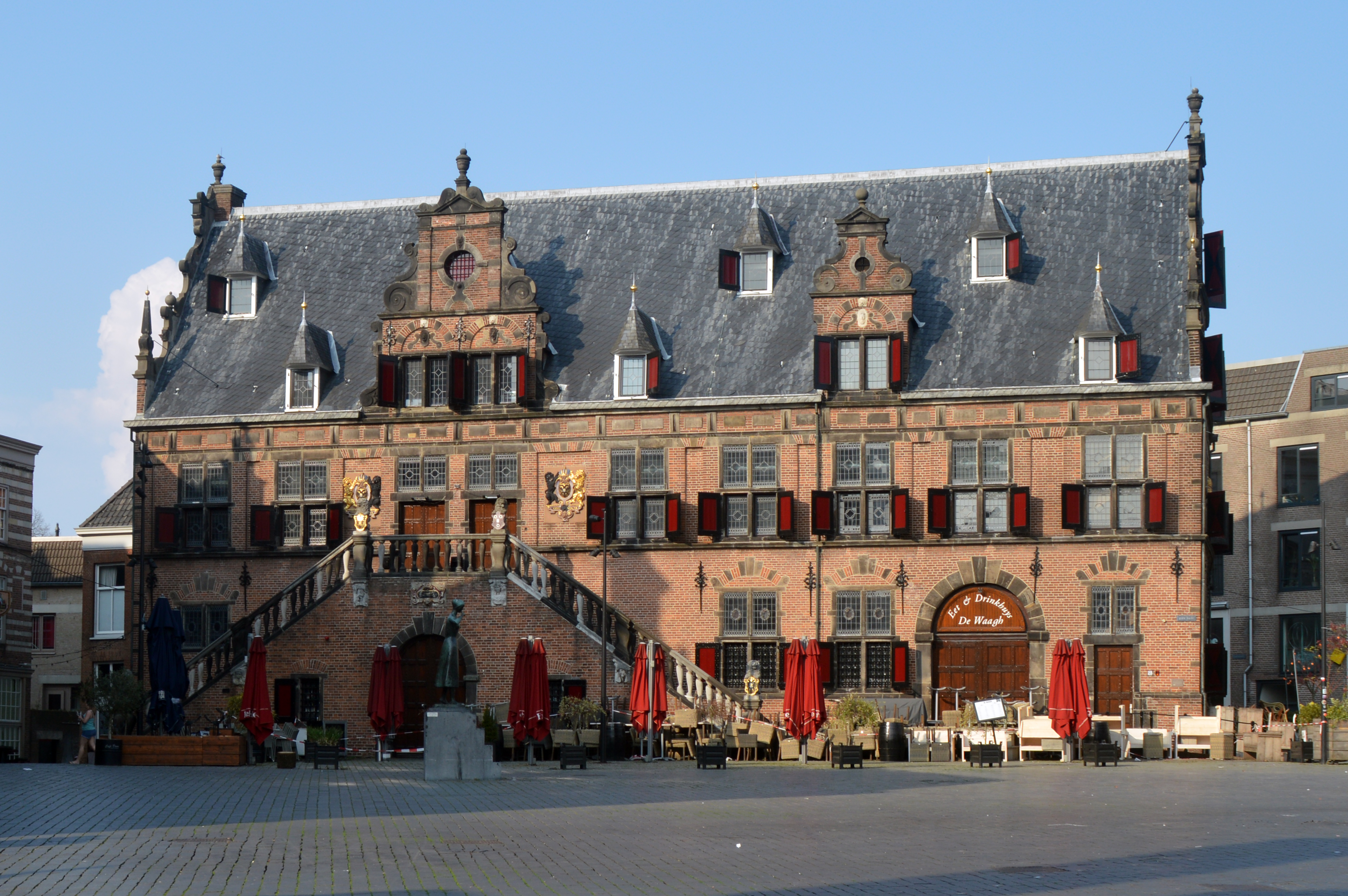
Weighhouse (1613)

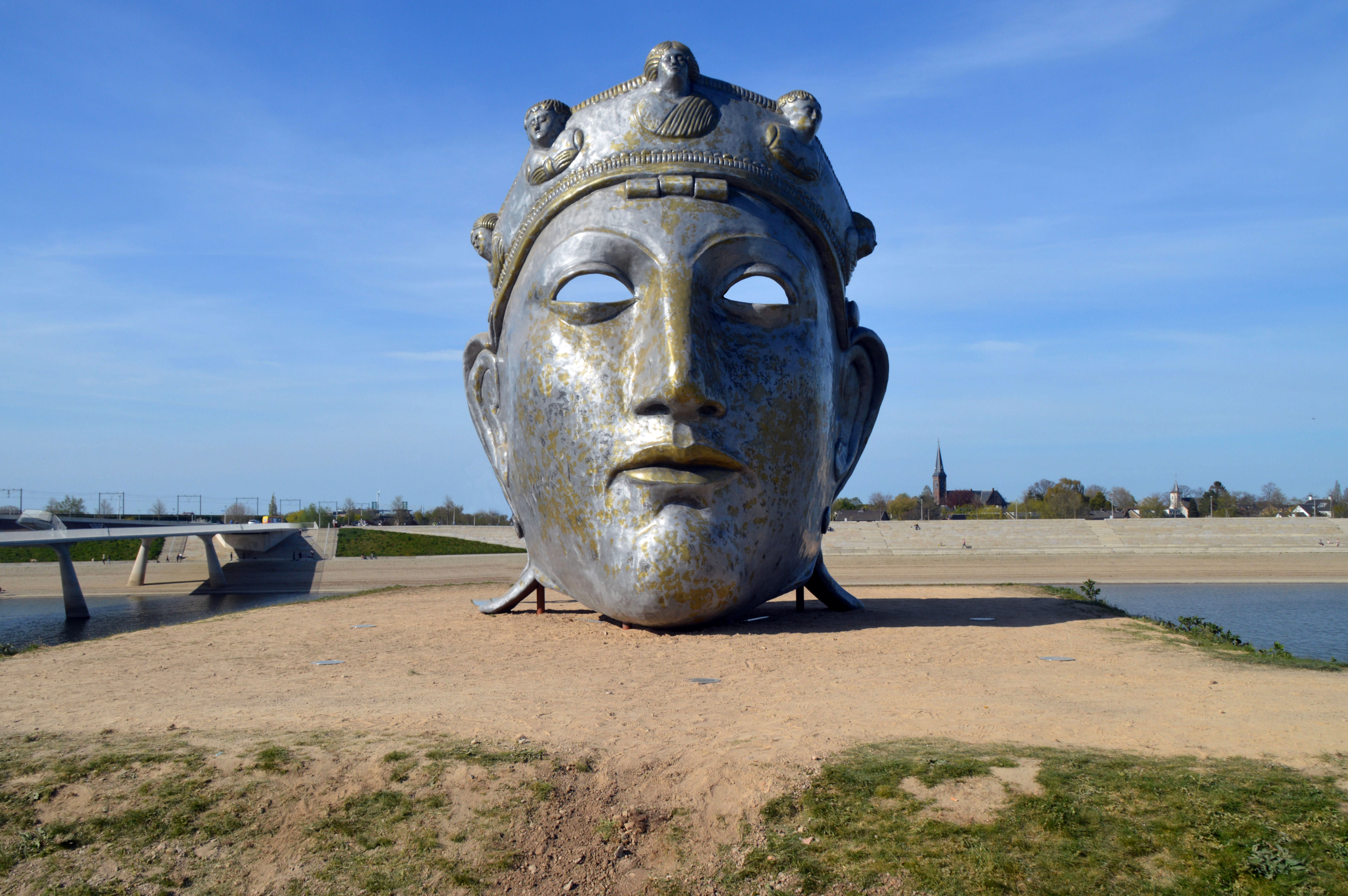
A sculpture from 2020 inspired by the Nijmegen Helmet

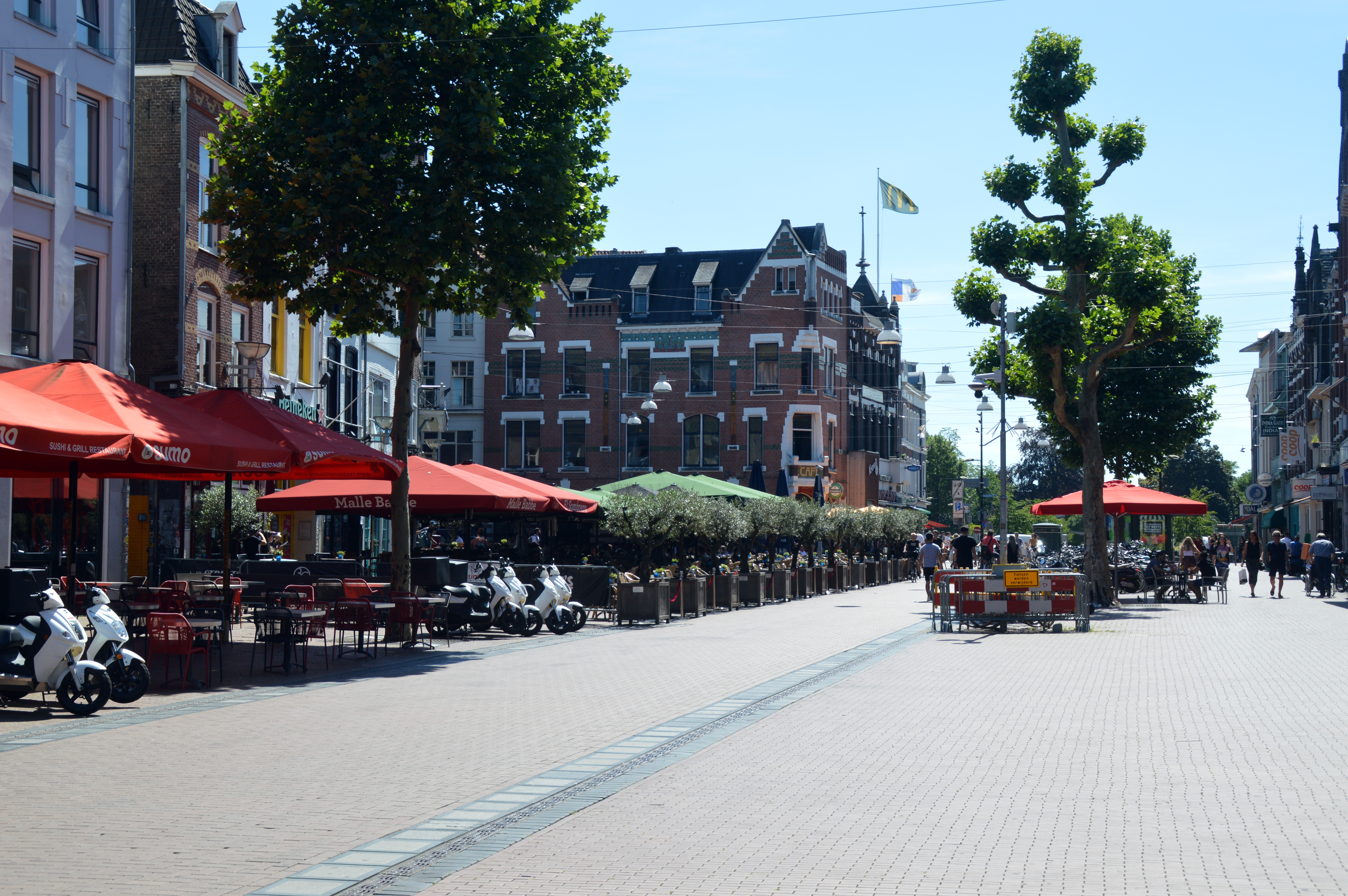
Terraces Molenstraat

Nijmegen (/ˈnaɪmeɪɡən/ NY-may-gən; Dutch: [ˈnɛimeːɣə(n)]; (Note: Obsolete Dutch spellings include Nijmwegen, Nymegen and Nieumeghen; French: Nimègue; German: Nimwegen; Spanish and Italian: Nimega.) Nijmeegs: Nimwéêge [ˈnɪmβ̞ɛːçə]) is the largest city in the Dutch province of Gelderland and the ninth largest of the Netherlands as a whole. Located on the Waal River close to the German border, Nijmegen is one of the oldest cities in the Netherlands and the first to be recognized as such in Roman times. In 2005, it celebrated 2,000 years of existence.

Nijmegen became a free imperial city in 1230 and a Hanseatic city in 1402. Since 1923 it has been a university city with the opening of a Catholic institution now known as the Radboud University Nijmegen. The city is well known for the annual Vierdaagse — the International Four Days Marches Nijmegen event.

Its population as of 2024 was 187,011.

== Population centres ==
The municipality is formed by the city of Nijmegen, incorporating the former villages of Hatert, Hees and Neerbosch, as well as the urban expansion projects in Veur-Lent, Nijmegen-Oosterhout and Nijmegen–Ressen, all situated north of the river Waal.

=== Proximity of border with Germany ===
The city lies a few kilometres from the border with Germany, and to some extent the westernmost villages in the municipality of Kranenburg, Germany, function as dormitories for people who work in the Dutch city of Nijmegen in part due to the immigration of Dutch people from the region who were attracted by the lower house pricing just across the border.

The German city of Duisburg (in the Ruhr region) is about 78 km (48.5 mi) away, while the German town of Kleve (in the Lower Rhine region) is about 20 km (12.4 mi) away.

== History ==
Historical population
Year	Pop.	±% p.a.
1400	10,800	—
1500	12,000	+0.11%
1560	10,000	−0.30%
1611	11,780	+0.32%
1651	8,160	−0.91%
1741	12,000	+0.43%
1795	11,008	−0.16%
Source: Lourens & Lucassen 1997

=== Antiquity ===
The first mention of Nijmegen in history is in the first century BC, when the Romans built a military camp on the place where Nijmegen was to appear; the location had great strategic value because of the surrounding hills, which give a good view over the river Waal and Rhine valley.

By 69, when the Batavi, the original inhabitants of the Rhine and Meuse (Maas) delta, revolted, a village called Oppidum Batavorum had formed near the Roman camp. This village was destroyed in the revolt, but when it had ended the Romans built another, bigger camp where the Legio X Gemina was stationed. Soon after, another village formed around this camp.

In 98, Nijmegen was the first of two settlements in what is now the Kingdom of the Netherlands to receive Roman city rights.

In 103, the X Gemina was restationed in Vindobona, now Vienna, which may have been a major blow to the economy of the village around the camp, losing around 5000 inhabitants. In 104 Emperor Trajan renamed the town, which became known as Ulpia Noviomagus Batavorum, Noviomagus for short, the ultimate origin of the current name.

A collection of artifacts from Roman antiquity were compiled by Johannes Smetius in the 17th century, called the Smetius Collection.

In January 2022, archeologists led by Pepijn van de Geer announced the discovery of an intact 2,000-year-old blue glass bowl with a vertical stripe pattern in Nijmegen. Researchers assume that this well-preserved bowl was made in a glass workshop. According to van de Geer, this type of bowl was made by allowing molten glass to cool and harden over a mould.

=== Middle Ages ===
Beginning in the latter half of the 4th century, Roman power decreased and Noviomagus eventually became part of Francia. It also appeared around this time on the Tabula Peutingeriana. In the 8th century Emperor Charlemagne maintained his palatium in Nijmegen in 777, and possibly on at least three more occasions. During his brief deposition of 830, the emperor Louis the Pious was sent to Nijmegen by his son, Lothair I. Thanks to the Waal, trade flourished.

Henry VI, Holy Roman Emperor, was born at Nijmegen in 1165. In 1230 his son Frederick II granted Nijmegen city rights. In 1247, the city was ceded to the count of Guelders as collateral for a loan. The loan was never repaid, and Nijmegen has been a part of Gelderland ever since. This did not hamper trade; Nijmegen even became part of the Hanseatic League in 1364.

The arts also flourished in this period. Famous medieval painters like the Limbourg brothers were born and educated in Nijmegen. Some of Hieronymus Bosch's ancestors also came from the city.

=== Early modern period ===
During the Dutch Revolt, trade came to a halt and even though Nijmegen became a part of the Republic of United Provinces after its capture from the Spanish in 1591, it remained a border town and had to endure multiple sieges.

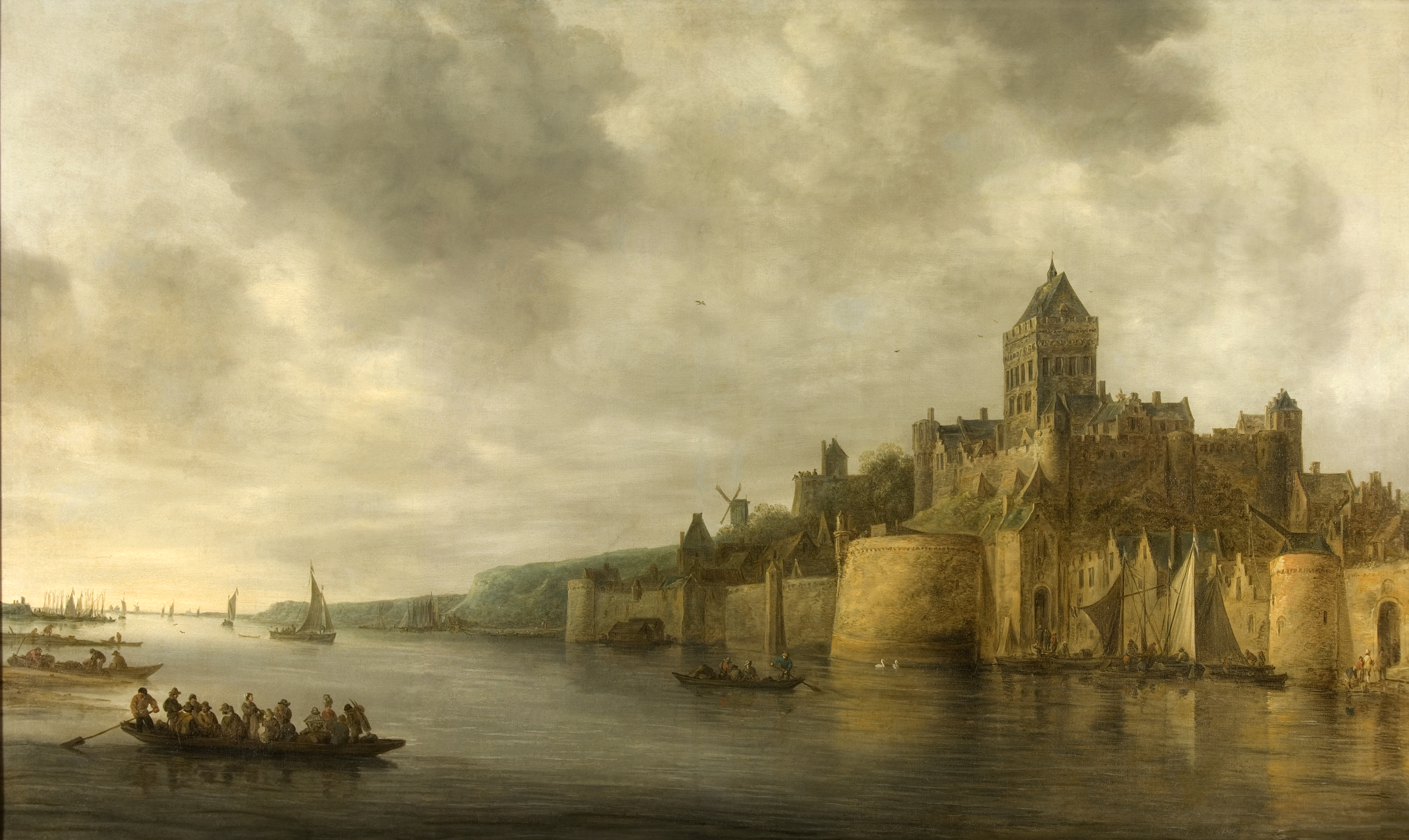
The Waal river near Nijmegen, 1641

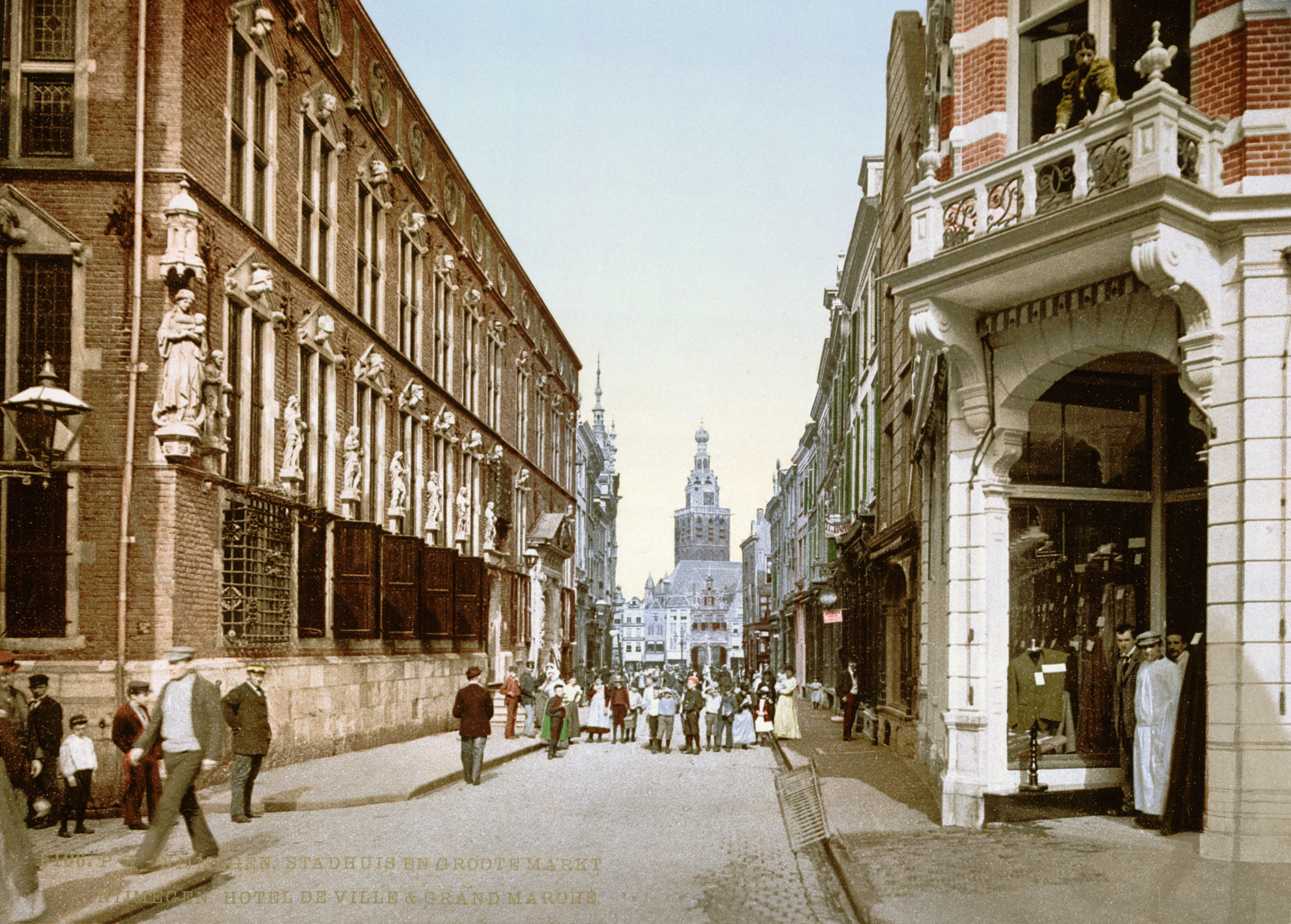
Nijmegen town hall (left) around 1900

In 1678 Nijmegen was host to the negotiations between the European powers that aimed to put an end to the constant warfare that had ravaged the continent for years. The result was the Treaty of Nijmegen that failed to provide for a lasting peace.

In 1702, at the start of the War of the Spanish Succession, the French nearly took Nijmegen by surprise. Only because of the intervention of an Anglo-Dutch army under the Earl of Athlone and the bravery of the citizens of Nijmegen was the Assault on Nijmegen repulsed.

In the second half of the 19th century, the fortifications around the city became a major problem. There were too many inhabitants inside the walls, but the fortifications could not be demolished because Nijmegen was deemed as being of vital importance to the defence of the Netherlands. When events in the Franco-Prussian War proved that old-fashioned fortifications were no longer of use, this policy was changed and the fortifications were dismantled in 1874. The old castle had already been demolished in 1797, so that its bricks could be sold.

Through the second half of the 19th century and the first half of the 20th century, Nijmegen grew steadily. In 1923 the current Radboud University Nijmegen was founded and in 1927 a channel was dug between the Waal and Meuse (Maas) rivers.

The Waal was bridged in 1878 by a rail bridge and in 1936 by a road bridge, which was claimed to be Europe's biggest bridge at the time. In November 2013 a second road bridge (Dutch: De Oversteek), 2 km downstream, was opened to ease congestion.

=== World War II ===
In 1940, the Netherlands was invaded by Germany, with Nijmegen being the first Dutch city to fall into German hands. On 22 February 1944, Nijmegen was heavily bombed by American planes, causing great damage to the city centre. It was subsequently claimed by the Allies that the American pilots thought they were bombing the German city of Kleve, while the Germans alleged that it was a planned operation authorised by the Dutch government in exile. The Dutch organization for investigating wartime atrocities, the NIOD, announced in January 2005 that its study of the incident confirmed that it was an accident caused by poor communications and chaos in the airspace. Over 750 people died in the bombardment.

During September 1944, the city saw heavy fighting during Operation Market Garden. The objective of the Battle of Nijmegen was mainly to prevent the Germans from destroying the bridges. Capturing the road bridge allowed the British Army XXX Corps to attempt to reach the 1st British Airborne Division in Arnhem. The bridge was heavily defended by over 300 German troops on both the north and south sides with close to 20 anti-tank guns and two anti-aircraft guns, supported with artillery. The Germans' late attempt to blow the road bridge was possibly foiled by a local Dutch resistance hero, Jan van Hoof, who is said to have cut the wires to the bridge. The Germans made repeated attacks on the bridge using bombs attached to driftwood, midget submarines and later resorted to shelling the bridge with 88mm barrages. Troops were positioned on the bridge giving an excellent arc of fire in case of attack. Troops that could not fit onto the bridge were positioned in a bombed-out house slightly upstream of the bridge. During the shelling, the house was hit, killing six soldiers and wounding one. Nijmegen was liberated from German occupation by the British Grenadier Guards of the Guards Armoured Division, as well as elements of the American 82nd Airborne Division in September 1944. The city was later used as a springboard for Operation Veritable, the invasion across the Rhine River by Allied Troops.

=== Post-war period ===
From 1946 to 1948 Mariënbosch concentration camp, near Nijmegen, was used to house German nationals who were to be deported from the Netherlands.

On 23 February 1981, the Nijmegen police department and the Dutch Army stormed the Piersonstraat and Zeigelhof, a squatted housing block in the city centre of Nijmegen. Using 200 riot vans, three Leopard 1s, three armoured personnel carriers, a helicopter, 1,200 policemen, and 750 members of the armed forces, they evicted the squatters and demolished the block, while clouding the entire area in teargas and CS gas. This received enormous backlash in local politics. While the city government wanted the squatters out to build a parking garage, most of the population wanted affordable housing to be built in the area.

The city council was largely dominated by left-wing and progressive parties such as the Green Party, Democrats 66, Socialist Party, and Labour. At times Nijmegen has been the only major city in the Netherlands with a solely left-wing government, and received the nickname 'Havana on the Waal'.

Nijmegen celebrated its 2000th year of existence in 2005.

In November 2005, the city centre of Nijmegen was the site of the assassination of political activist Louis Sévèke by a former activist, Marcel Teunissen, who was arrested in 2007 in Spain and extradited to the Netherlands. Teunissen was also accused of bank robbery. He committed his acts out of revenge for a forcible eviction from the squatter scene by Sévèke.

== Geography ==
=== Climate ===
Nijmegen has an oceanic climate (Cfb). It is one of the warmest cities of the Netherlands, especially during summer, when the highest temperatures in the country are usually measured in the triangle Roermond–Nijmegen–Eindhoven. The lack of north–south oriented mountain ranges in Europe make this area prone to sudden shifts in weather, giving the region a semi-continental climate.

Some of the northernmost wineries in the world are found just outside Nijmegen, around Groesbeek, a suburban village south-east of Nijmegen.

During the 2006 European heatwave, closest official weather station Volkel reached a high of 36.7 °C (98.1 °F) on 19 July. The heat wave coincided with that year's Four Day Marches, which were cancelled after the first day, when two people died of hyperthermia-related causes. Temperatures on that day, 18 July, reached around 36 °C (96.8 °F) in the city.

Climate data for Nijmegen, Netherlands (1971–2000)
Month	Jan	Feb	Mar	Apr	May	Jun	Jul	Aug	Sep	Oct	Nov	Dec	Year
Record high °C (°F)	15.0 (59.0)	17.7 (63.9)	23.0 (73.4)	27.1 (80.8)	31.9 (89.4)	34.8 (94.6)	36.7 (98.1)	36.3 (97.3)	31.0 (87.8)	27.5 (81.5)	18.4 (65.1)	16.0 (60.8)	36.7 (98.1)
Mean daily maximum °C (°F)	5.2 (41.4)	6.2 (43.2)	9.8 (49.6)	13.3 (55.9)	18.1 (64.6)	20.4 (68.7)	22.6 (72.7)	22.9 (73.2)	19.0 (66.2)	14.3 (57.7)	8.9 (48.0)	6.2 (43.2)	13.9 (57.0)
Daily mean °C (°F)	2.6 (36.7)	2.9 (37.2)	5.8 (42.4)	8.4 (47.1)	12.9 (55.2)	15.5 (59.9)	17.5 (63.5)	17.3 (63.1)	14.1 (57.4)	10.2 (50.4)	6.0 (42.8)	3.8 (38.8)	9.8 (49.6)
Mean daily minimum °C (°F)	−0.2 (31.6)	−0.4 (31.3)	1.7 (35.1)	3.4 (38.1)	7.4 (45.3)	10.2 (50.4)	12.2 (54.0)	11.7 (53.1)	9.4 (48.9)	6.1 (43.0)	2.8 (37.0)	1.0 (33.8)	5.4 (41.7)
Record low °C (°F)	−20.1 (−4.2)	−15.3 (4.5)	−13.7 (7.3)	−7.4 (18.7)	−1.7 (28.9)	0.9 (33.6)	3.8 (38.8)	3.5 (38.3)	−0.9 (30.4)	−5.5 (22.1)	−9.8 (14.4)	−18.8 (−1.8)	−20.1 (−4.2)
Average precipitation mm (inches)	64.8 (2.55)	42.7 (1.68)	63.0 (2.48)	44.4 (1.75)	58.8 (2.31)	74.3 (2.93)	62.6 (2.46)	56.2 (2.21)	68.9 (2.71)	66.2 (2.61)	69.9 (2.75)	72.3 (2.85)	744.1 (29.30)
Average precipitation days	22	17	21	18	17	18	17	17	18	19	21	22	227
Average relative humidity (%)	89	86	82	77	75	76	77	77	83	87	90	90	82
Mean monthly sunshine hours	47.4	74.1	105.7	151.7	193.5	172.5	183.1	182.9	127.4	102.8	55.8	40.0	1,436.9
Source: Klimaatatlas van Nederland, normaalperiode 1971–2000, ISBN 90-389-1191-2

=== Historical remains ===
Few Roman remains are visible today; a fragment of the old city wall can be seen near the casino and the foundations of the amphitheatre are traced in the paving of the present-day Rembrandtstraat. The Valkhof Museum, on the Valkhof, has a permanent display of the history of Nijmegen, including artifacts from the Roman era. Additionally, they usually have temporary exhibitions of more and less famous artists. During building works in the Waalsprong area, ruins from before the Roman times were found which were identified in 2022 as those of a sauna. This 3,600 year-old sauna is the first of its kind in mainland Europe.

Not many very old buildings are left in town: first the Americans bombed it in February 1944, later the Germans shelled it for about five months after the liberation in September 1944, and finally there were a number of vigorous city planners in the 1950s, 60s and 70s who finished the demolition. There are still a few noteworthy sights, however. Valkhof hill features the Valkhof chapel which is the oldest intact building in the Netherlands (approx. 1050 AD) and a small remnant of a castle built by the Holy Roman Emperor Frederick Barbarossa that was largely demolished in 1798. The 750-year old Stevenskerk had to be reconstructed after WWII.

== Demographics ==
As of 2023, Nijmegen has a total population of about 182,465.

2020	Numbers	%
Dutch natives	130,549	73.4%
Western migration background	21,457	12%
Non-Western migration background	25,653	14.4%
Turkey	5,553	3.1%
Indonesia	4,167	2.3%
Morocco	3,930	2.2%
Netherlands Antilles and Aruba	2,197	1.23%
Suriname	1,590	0.89%
Total	177,659	100%

== Politics ==
The city is governed by a council of 39 councillors, elected every four years.

Council seats 2018–2026
Party	Seats 2026	Seats 2022	Seats 2018
GroenLinks (Greens)	11	9	11
D66 (Liberal Democrats)	7	6	6
Stadspartij Nijmegen	6	7	3
PvdA (Labour)	4	4	3
VVD (Conservative Liberals)	3	3	4
CDA (Christian–Democrats)	2	2	2
PvdD (Party for the Animals)	2	4	2
SP (Socialists)	1	3	5
Forum for Democracy	1	1	1
Volt Netherlands	1	0	0
1Nijmegen	1	0	0
Gewoon Nijmegen	0	1	1
50PLUS	0	0	1
VoorNijmegen.NU	0	0	1

Since the 2022 municipal elections, the three largest parties, GroenLinks, D66 and the Stadspartij Nijmegen have formed a coalition. Since 2012 the mayor has been Hubert Bruls of the Christian Democratic Appeal party (CDA), the city council approving a third six-year term from 2024.

In addition to the city council, since 1988 Nijmegen has been part of a regional body. Since 2021 this has been the Arnhem-Nijmegen Green Metropolitan Region (Dutch: Groene Metropoolregio Arnhem-Nijmegen), which aids co-operation in planning and development in the region's eighteen municipalities.

=== Twin and sister cities ===
Nijmegen is twinned with:

- Albany, New York
- Gaziantep, Turkey
- Higashimatsuyama, Japan
- Masaya, Nicaragua
- Oulu, Finland
- Pskov, Russia
- Suzhou, China

== Culture ==
=== Events ===
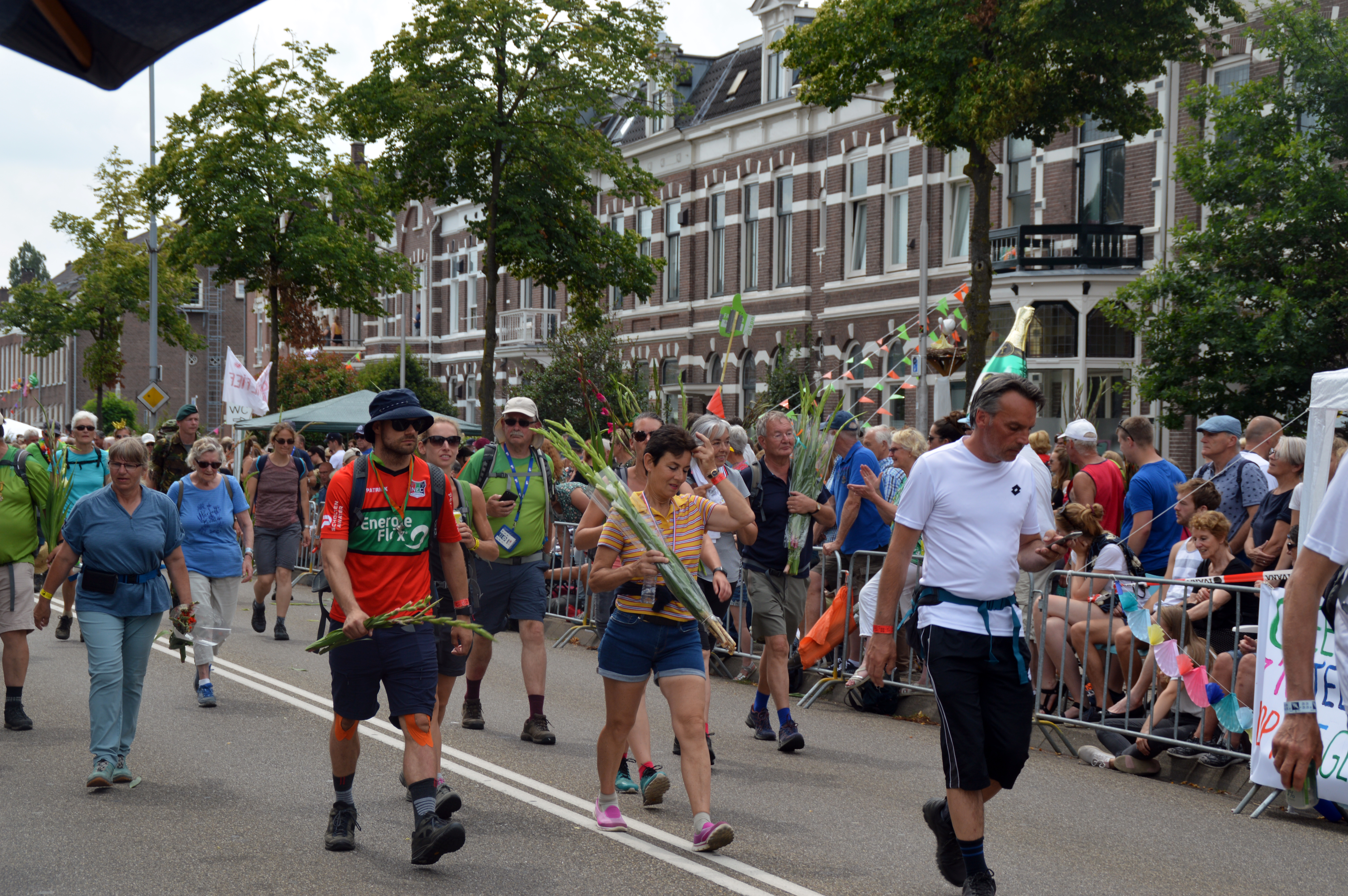
Four Days Marches

==== Four Days Marches ====
Nijmegen has hosted since 1925 the annual Four Days Marches (Vierdaagse), as a means of promoting sport and exercise. Beginning on the third Tuesday of each July, over 40,000 participants from about 70 countries undertake four days of walking with distances ranging from 30 to 50 km (19 to 31 mi) a day. The marches are supplemented with festivities such as the Vierdaagse Festival.

=== People ===
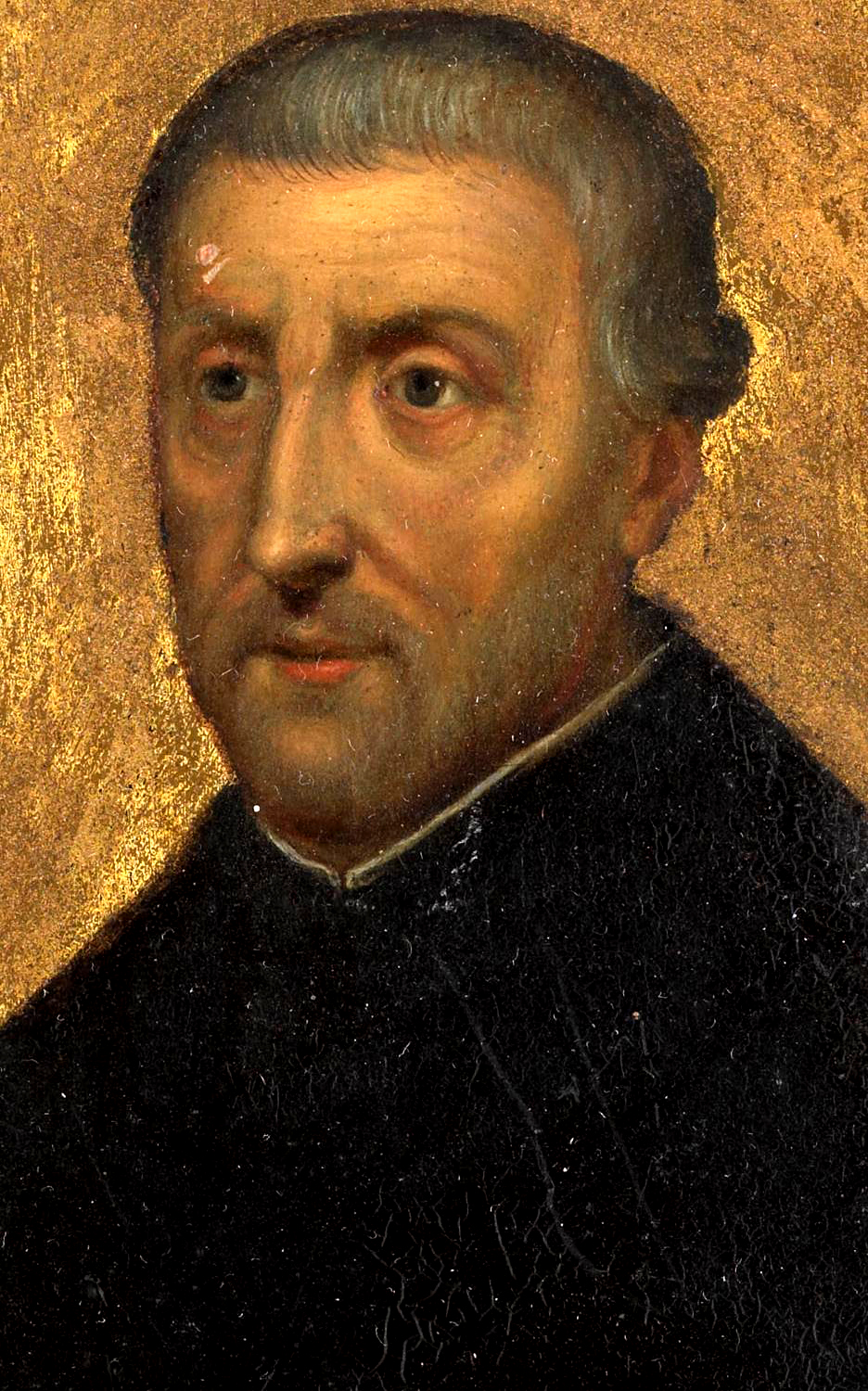
Saint Petrus Canisius

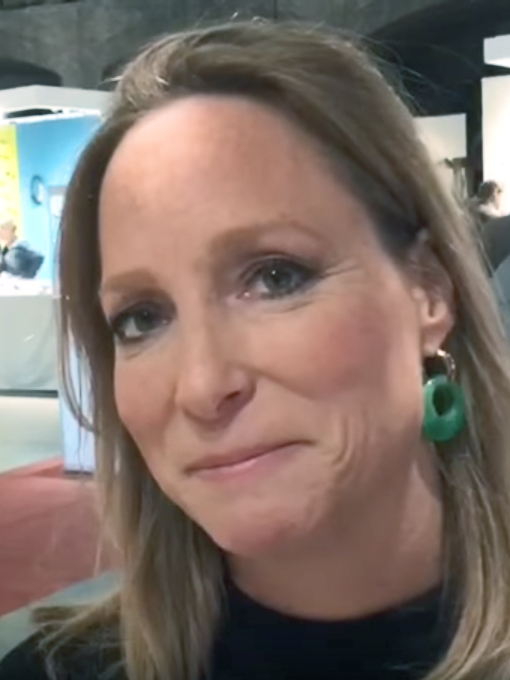
Margarita de Bourbon de Parme, 2016

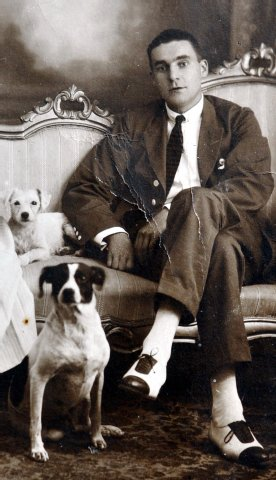
Alfred Nourney, 1912

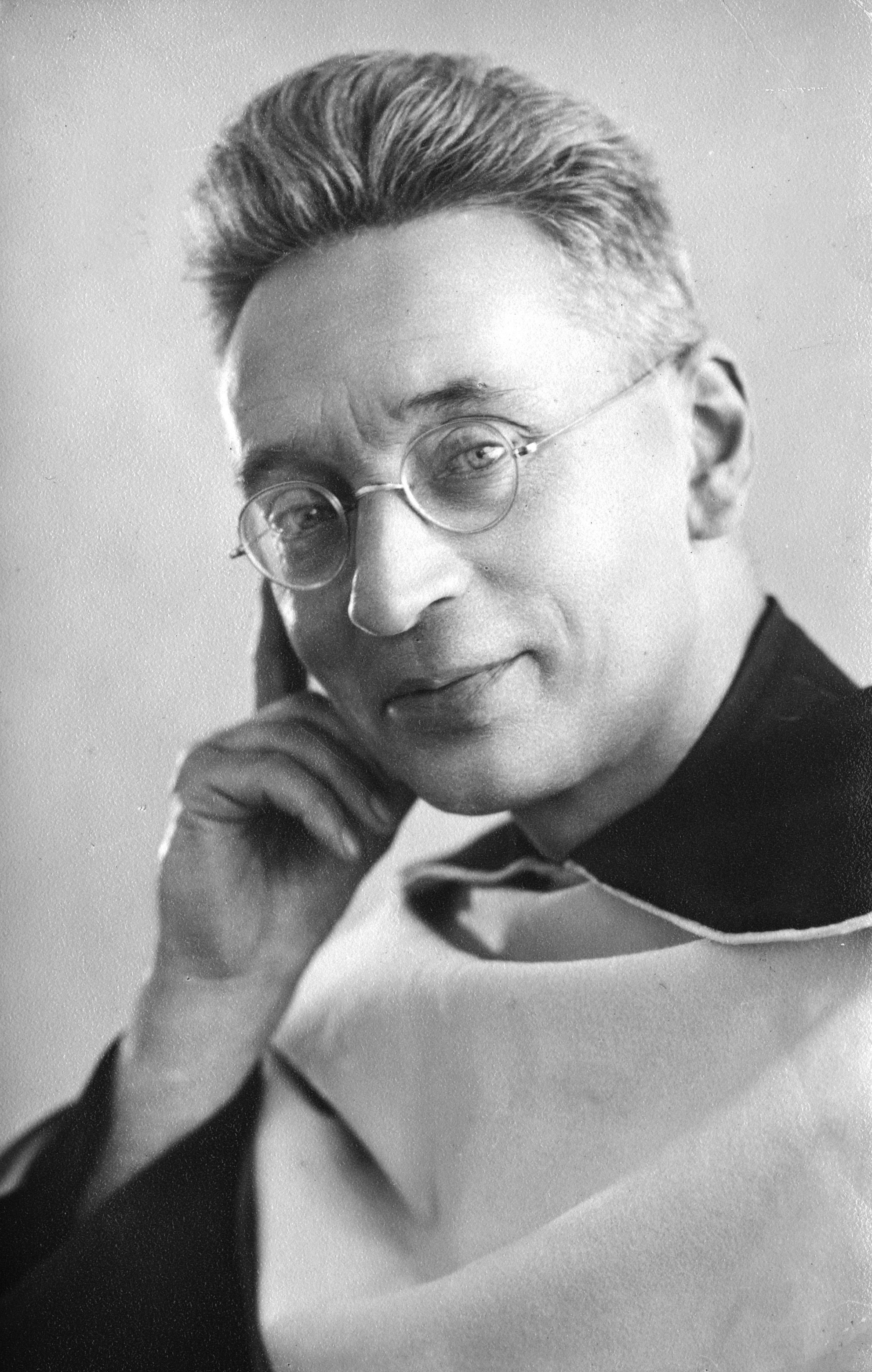
Titus Brandsma, 1920s

==== Natives ====
- Henry VI, Holy Roman Emperor (1165–1197)
- Jean Malouel (1365-1416), painter
- Limbourg brothers (1385–1416), medieval painters
- Giovanni Antoniano (died 1588), Patristic scholar
- Petrus Canisius (1521–1597), Catholic saint
- Henriette Pressburg (1788–1863), mother of Karl Marx
- Sophie Pressburg (1797–1854), grandmother of Anton and Gerard Philips who founded Philips Electronics
- Pieter Claude Bijleveld (1828–1898), mayor
- Alfred Nourney (1892–1972), German socialite and Titanic survivor
- Carli Biessels (1936–2016), writer
- Roosje Glaser (1914–2000), dancer and Holocaust survivor
- Henk de Haan (born 1941), economist and politician
- Daphne Deckers (born 1968), model, host, writer and occasional actress
- Princess Margarita of Bourbon-Parma (born 1972), member of the Dutch royal family
- Prince Hugo de Bourbon de Parme (born 1997), member of the Dutch royal family
- Jos Hermens (born 1950), athlete
- Alex Van Halen (born 1953), musician
- Eddie Van Halen (1955-2020), musician
- Frank Boeijen (born 1957), musician
- Anne Quist (born 1957), Olympic rower
- Ron de Groot (born 1960), footballer
- Pie Geelen (born 1972), Olympic swimmer
- Roxane van Iperen (born 1976), writer
- Frank Demouge (born 1982), footballer
- Saadia Himi (born 1984), Miss Netherlands Earth 2004
- Nacer Barazite (born 1990), footballer
- Amira Willighagen (born 2004), classical singer
- Prince Bernhard of Orange-Nassau, van Vollenhoven (born 1969), racing driver, entrepreneur and member of the Dutch royal family
- Prince Pieter-Christiaan of Orange-Nassau, van Vollenhoven (born 1972), racing driver and member of the Dutch royal family

==== Other residents ====
- Titus Brandsma – (1881–1942), Carmelite friar, philosopher and Resistance member
- Dries van Agt – (1931–2024), politician, Prime Minister of the Netherland
- Nina Simone – (1933–2003), jazz musician
- Edward Ka-Spel – (born 1954), vocalist of The Legendary Pink Dots
- Perry Ubeda – (born 1971), kickboxer
- Karapet Karapetyan – (born 1982), kickboxer
- Sóley Tómasdóttir – (born 1974), activist and former Icelandic politician

=== Religion ===
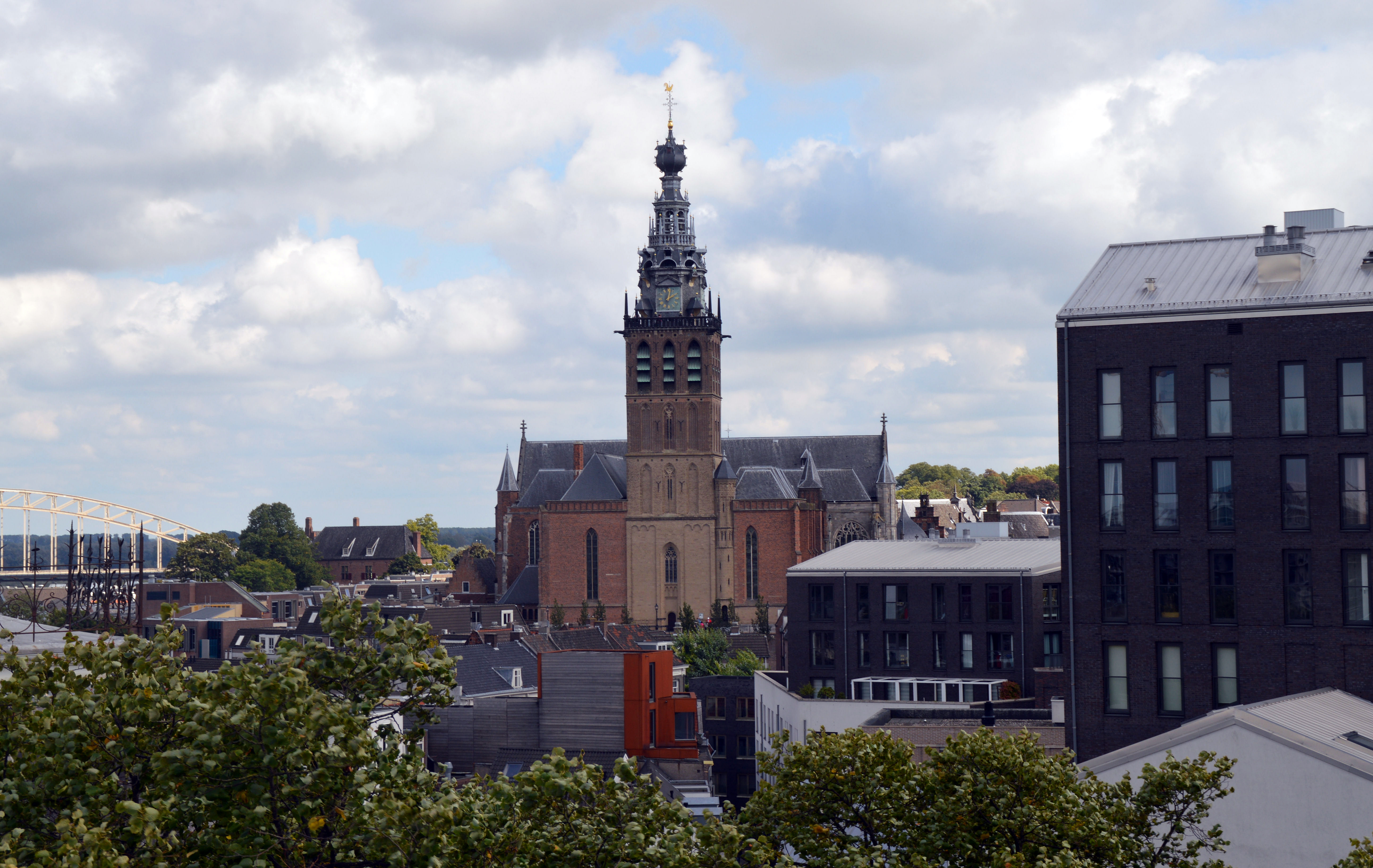
Grote of Sint-Stevenskerk Church Nijmegen

In 1968, theologians in the Catholic Church issued what is now known as the Nijmegen Statement, demanding sweeping reforms in the Vatican's Holy Office, previously known as The Inquisition, and calling for greater scope for theological inquiry. Among its signatories was theologian Fr. Joseph Ratzinger, then a member of the faculty at the University of Tübingen, but later the head of the successor to the Holy Office, the Congregation for the Doctrine of the Faith, and later still Pope Benedict XVI.

The Nijmegen Statement said: "Any form of Inquisition however subtle, not only harms the development of sound theology, it also causes irreparable damage to the credibility of the church". The signatories, a group of predominantly German-speaking theologians asserted that "the freedom of theologians, and theology in the service of the church, regained by Vatican II, must not be jeopardised again." The signatories pledged their loyalty to the Pope, but argued that the teaching office of pope and bishops "cannot and must not supersede, hamper and impede the teaching task of theologians as scholars."

=== Sport ===
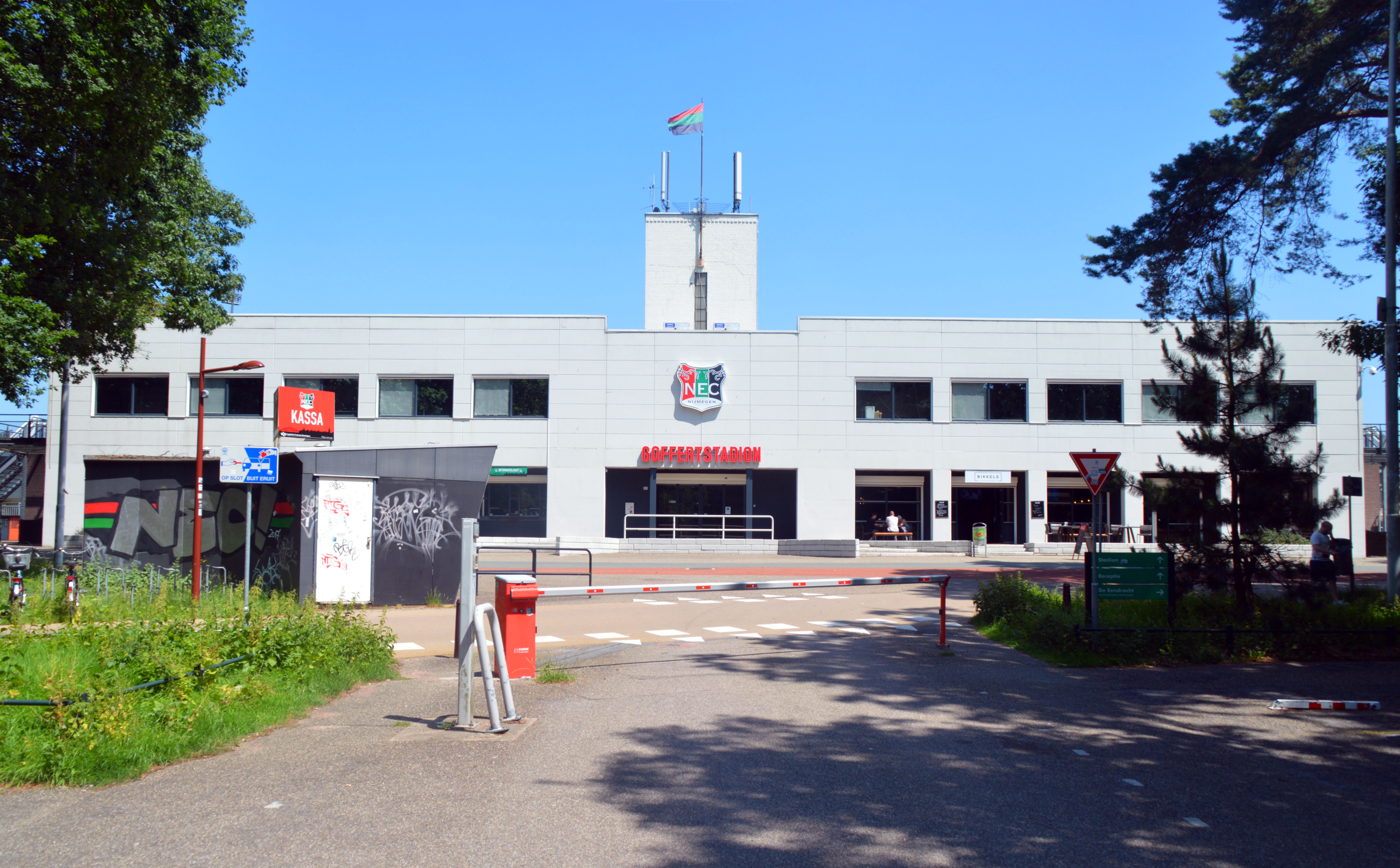
Goffertstadion NEC Nijmegen

Sport in the city is principally focused on its football club NEC Nijmegen or just NEC, short for Nijmegen Eendracht Combinatie, which plays at the 12,500-seat Stadion de Goffert. The club plays in the Eredivisie.

Bandy Vereniging Nijmegen is the biggest bandy club in the country. The national team got celebrated by over a hundred fans and Mayor Hubert Bruls after winning Division B of the 2018 Bandy World Championship.

The city is also home to one of the country's oldest cricket clubs, Quick 1888, a current member of the KNCB. Formed in 1888, it is the largest cricket club in the east of the country and was formed 13 years after the first club, Utile Dulci from Deventer. The cricket club has two men's teams. The city also has the Nijmegen Devils, an Ice hockey club. Nijmegen also plays host to the annual Zevenheuvelenloop (Seven Hills Run), an annual 15 km (9 mi) run recognised by the IAAF as a Bronze Label race.

== Economy and infrastructure ==
=== Economy ===
The three main employers in Nijmegen are:

1. Radboud University;

2. The three hospitals in the city: Radboud University Medical Center, Sint Maartenskliniek, and Canisius-Wilhelmina Ziekenhuis (CWZ);

3. The semiconductor industry. Nexperia and Ampleon (both spun off from NXP Semiconductors) are headquartered in the city. Multinational companies such as Qualcomm, Photronics Inc, and Applied Materials also have facilities in Nijmegen.

Other notable companies headquartered in Nijmegen include Synthon, a Dutch multinational pharmaceutical company and Vaxxinova, an EW group subsidiary which produces animal vaccines.

=== More room for the river Waal ===
To prevent flooding in the near future, the Dutch government is changing the course of more than 30 rivers throughout the country. These measures, taken along the rivers IJssel, Lek, Maas and Waal, are known as 'Room for the River'. Room for the river Waal as it passes Nijmegen is one of these measures. As part of this, the artificial island Veur-Lent was created in 2015.

The river Waal not only has a sharp bend near Nijmegen, it also forms a bottleneck. In 1993 and 1995, this led to high water and floods. To prevent this from happening again, and to protect inhabitants of the city and its surroundings against the water, work has been done to relocate the Waal dike in Lent and to excavate a large ancillary channel in the flood plains, creating an island in the Waal opposite Nijmegen. The large-scale project involved the construction of three bridges, new dikes and concrete water barriers. The island contains an urban river park with possibilities for recreation, culture, water and nature.

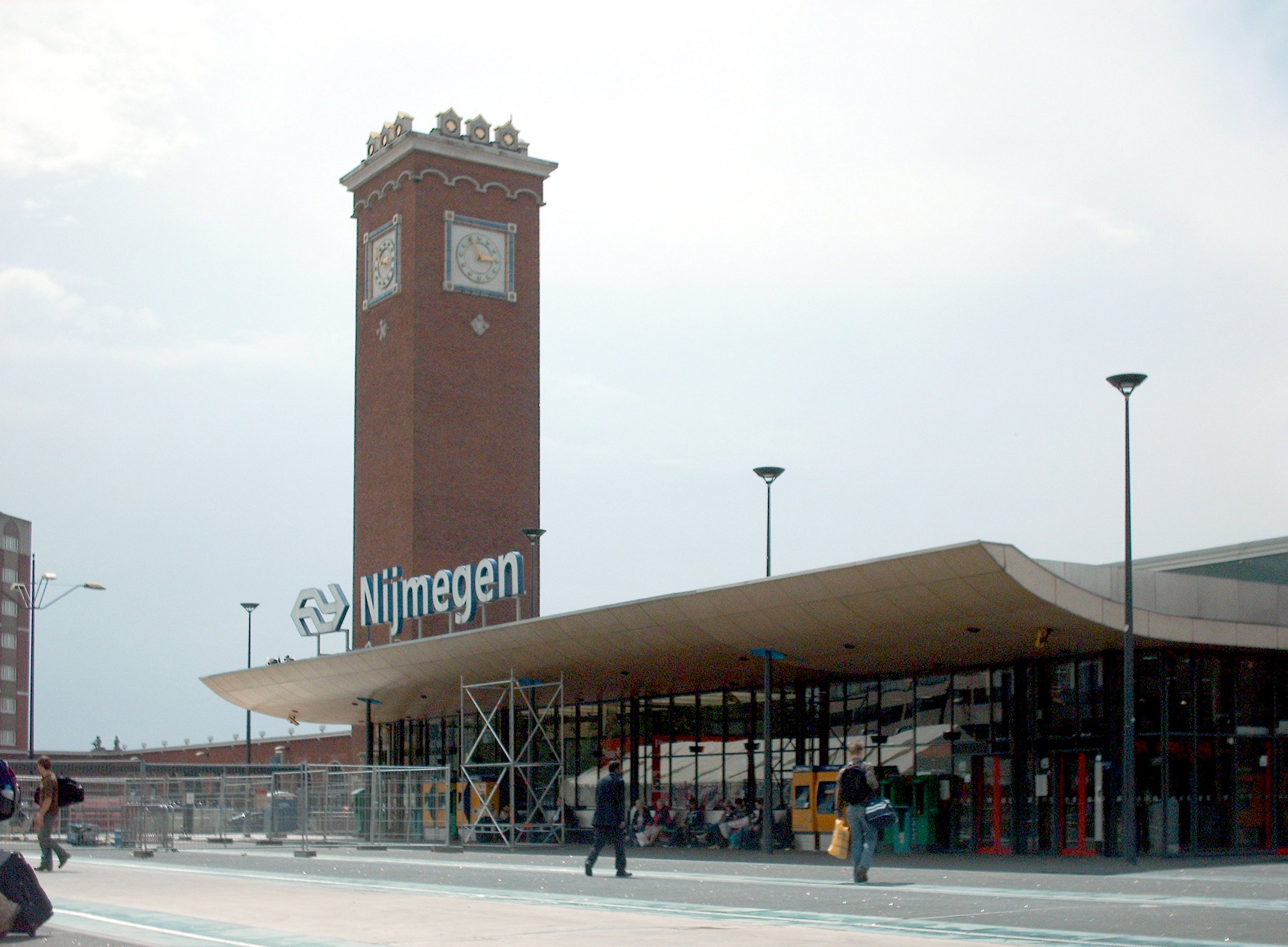
Nijmegen Central Station

=== Transport ===
Nijmegen has five railway stations: Nijmegen, Nijmegen Dukenburg, Nijmegen Heyendaal, Nijmegen Lent and Nijmegen Goffert. The central station is connected to the national Intercity network. The bus company Transdev under the name RRReis operates the city buses in the Arnhem-Nijmegen metropolitan area.

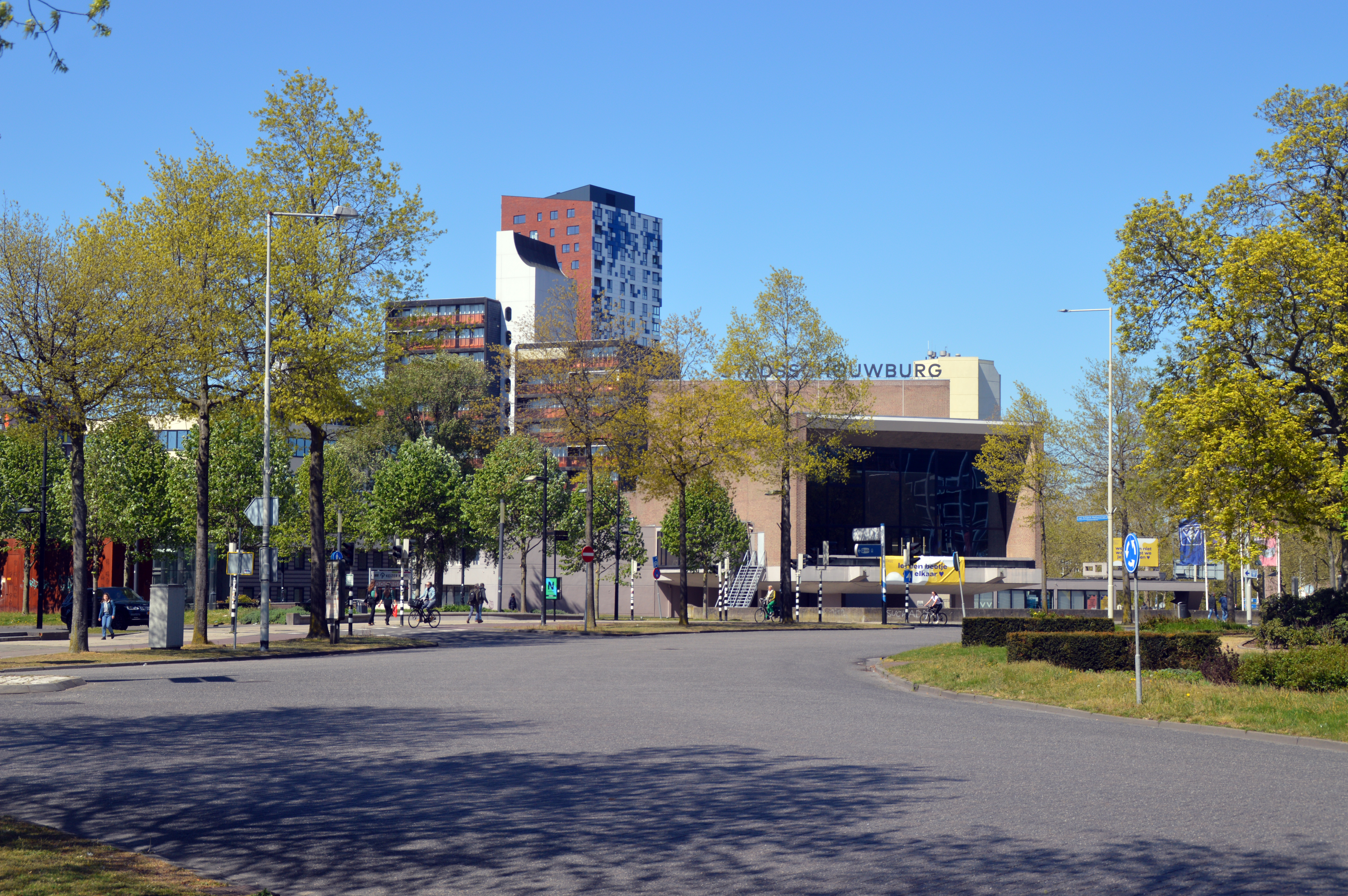
Keizer Karelplein

Like most Dutch cities, bicycles are an important mode of transport. The city is connected to Arnhem, 18 km (11 mi) to the north, by a "fietssnelweg" (fast cycle highway) which crosses the Snelbinder bridge in the city. During 2010–2012 the cycle highway received upgrades to further encourage the use of bicycles for transport between Nijmegen and Arnhem. In May 2016, the Dutch Fietsersbond (Cyclists' Union) awarded the 2016 Fietsstad (Cycling City) award to the city of Nijmegen.

Keizer Karelplein (English: The Plaza of Emperor Charlemagne), a roundabout in the center of the city with seven busy connecting or almost connecting roads, is one of the most accident-prone roads in the Netherlands, and Nijmegen has an extensive, overcrowded road network that splits up the city in separate parts instead of having the busy roads out-of-center away from densely populated areas as is the norm in the rest of the country. The roundabout surrounds a small park which is rarely used because there is no protected pedestrian crossing to the center of the roundabout. There is also a Keizer Karelplein in Maastricht.

The river is a busy freight transport route, with barges passing through on the way between the industrial regions of Germany and the docks at Amsterdam, Rotterdam and Hook of Holland. The Maas–Waal Canal also carries freight through the city.

== Education ==
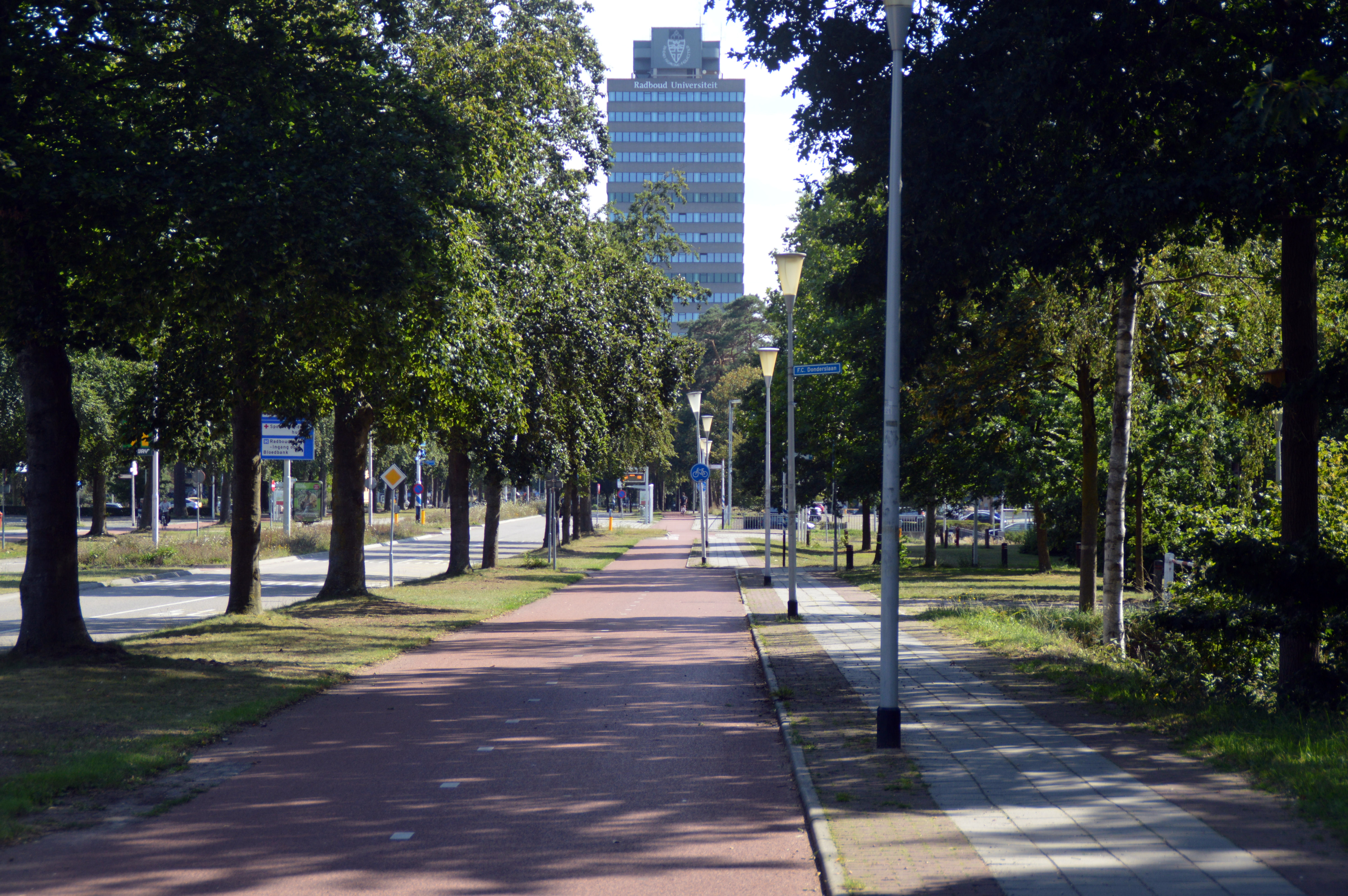
Radboud University Nijmegen

Nijmegen is host to Radboud University Nijmegen. Founded in 1923 as the first Catholic university in the Netherlands, it used to be called Catholic University of Nijmegen until 2004, when it took its current name. As of October 2018, it had 22,142 students and 4,921 staff. Radboud University runs the High Field Magnetic Laboratory which is able to achieve some of the highest fields available in Europe at 38 teslas (continuous). The facility is available to outside users, primarily for research purposes.

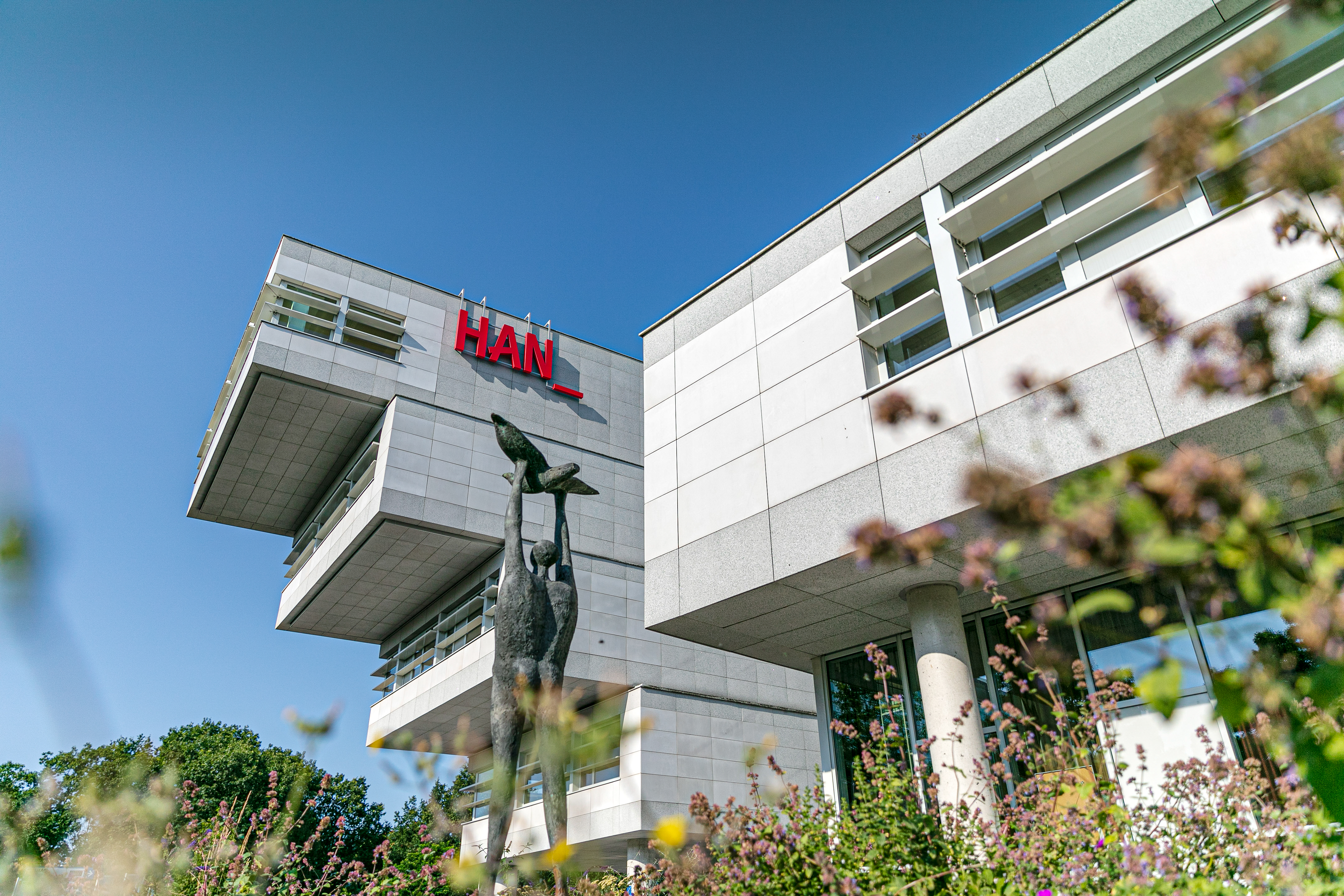
HAN University of Applied Sciences in Nijmegen

Nijmegen is also home to HAN University of Applied Sciences, one of the largest universities of applied sciences in the Netherlands. Founded in 1996 through the merger of several institutions, HAN has over 35,000 students and 4,000 staff members. It offers a wide range of bachelor's and master's programs, with a strong focus on applied research and professional development. The university has campuses in both Nijmegen and Arnhem, with its education, medical, and health-related programs, based in Nijmegen.

In addition to these institutions, there is also an intermediate-level vocational school and a number of secondary schools: Groenschool Nijmegen, Kandinsky College, Nijmeegse Scholengemeenschap Groenewoud (NSG), Citadel College, Stedelijke Scholengemeenschap Nijmegen (SSGN), Canisius College, St. Jorisschool, Mondial College, the Stedelijk Gymnasium Nijmegen (formerly the "Latijnse school", founded in the 16th century), the Karel de Grote College, Montessori College and the Dominicus College. Of note is also Leefwerkschool Eigenwijs, which caters to students from all over the Netherlands who have been repeatedly expelled from "regular" high schools. Leefwerkschool Eigenwijs has its roots in the local activist movement of the early 1980s and is the only school of its kind recognised in the Netherlands.

Nijmegen is also an important centre of Psycholinguistics, home to the Max Planck Institute of Psycholinguistics and the F.C. Donders Centre for Cognitive Neuroimaging.

The Nobel Prize for Physics in 2010 was awarded to Andre Geim and Konstantin Novoselov who had begun their exploration of the special properties of the material Graphene at Radboud University's High Magnetic Field Laboratory. Geim was at Radboud from 1994 to 2000 before moving to Manchester University. Novoselov completed his PhD at Radboud in 2004 and joined Geim at Manchester to continue the "groundbreaking experiments regarding the two-dimensional material graphene" that resulted in the Nobel Prize. Both went on to hold associate professorships within Radboud's Department of Theory of Condensed Matter.
