= Pieter Claude Bijleveld =

Dutch politician

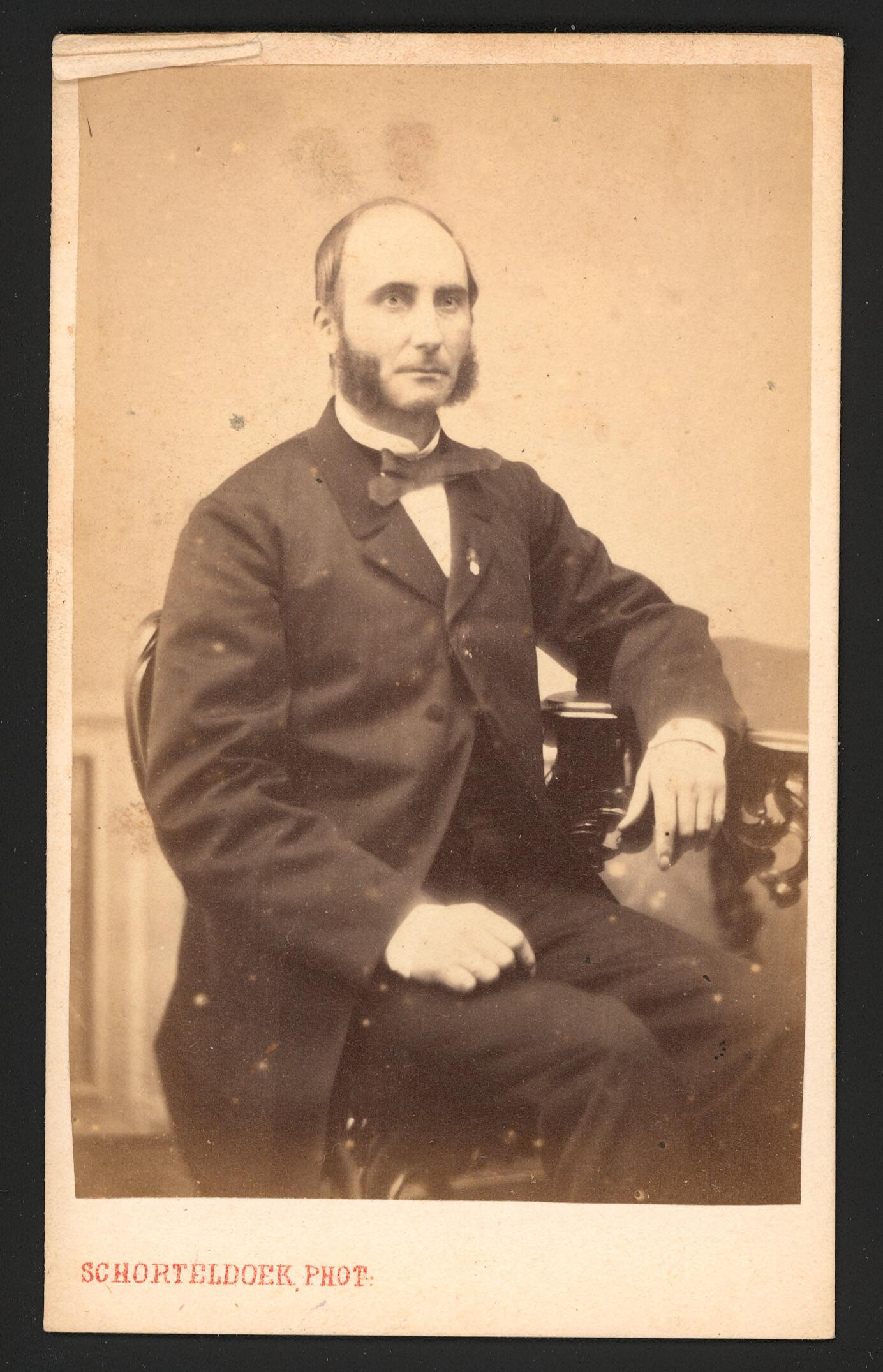
Mr. Pieter Claude Bijleveld

LLM Pieter Claude Bijleveld (Nijmegen, August 28, 1828 – Nijmegen, September 2, 1898) was a Dutch politician.

== Life and work ==
Bijleveld was a son of Nijmegen mayor François Pierre Bijleveld and Reiniera Charlotte Rau. He studied law. In 1856 he was appointed mayor of Zaltbommel and in 1875 he succeeded his father as mayor of Nijmegen, a function he held until his death in 1898. Bijleveld was Officier in de Orde van Oranje-Nassau.

Bijleveld married on 4 juni 1857 with Gosuina Alida Rudolphina Ketjen, a daughter of Jan Hendrik Ketjen and Adriana Sophia baroness Van Randwijck. Pieter Bijleveld was a scion of the Dutch patrician family Bijleveld.

== Streetname ==
A proposal, in 1896, to name a street for his father, during his mayoralty, was rejected by the council of Nijmegen. The street Bijleveldsingel is probably named after Pieter Claude Bijleveld himself.
