= Operation Berlin =

Operation Berlin may refer to:

- Operation Berlin (Arnhem), a Second World War evacuation operation in the Netherlands
- Operation Berlin (Atlantic), a Second World War German commerce raid in the Atlantic
- Operation Berlín (Colombia), a 2000 Colombian Army ambush against the FARC

== See also ==
- Battle of Berlin
