= Death of René Steegmans =

Violent death in the Netherlands

Coordinates: 51.3651°N 6.1656°E

The death of René Steegmans (January 1, 1980 – October 24, 2002) was a violent crime which occurred in Venlo, Netherlands, on October 22, 2002, which drew national attention for being an act of senseless violence.

Steegmans addressed two youths for driving recklessly past an old lady on their scooter. According to witnesses he asked for some respect for the elderly. Eighteen-year-old Khalid Lakhlifi and Sylvio Richters then attacked Steegmans, kicking and beating him several times. Witnesses did not intervene. Steegmans was hospitalised with brain damage at the Radboud Medical Centre in Nijmegen, where he died a day later.

A silent march was organised to commemorate his death. Khalid was later sentenced to eight years in prison and involuntary commitment. Sylvio, who did not fight but only encouraged Khalid, was sentenced to twelve months of youth detention, of which 6 months on probation. The violent death of René Steegmans, combined with the Moroccan, Muslim background of the main perpetrator, and along with his parents' comment that „it had been the will of Allah”, caused a national discussion on integration, and senseless violence.

== In popular culture ==
The death of René Steegmans was described in the 2004 number 1 hit single zinloos (English: senseless) by Lange Frans & Baas B, which described several acts of senseless violence.
