= Senseless violence =

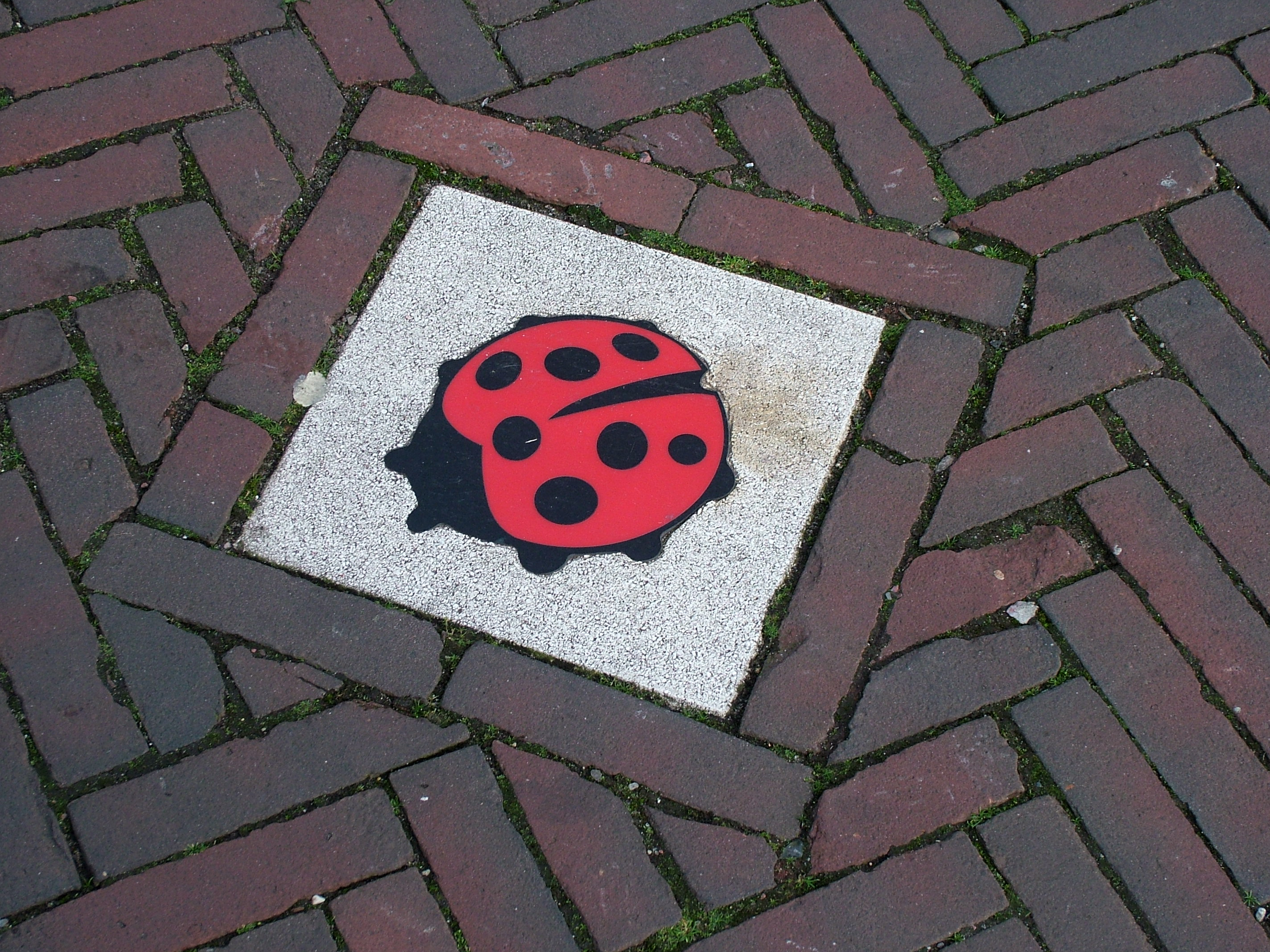
The ladybug street tile is a symbol against "senseless violence" in the Netherlands and is often placed on the sites of deadly crimes.

Senseless violence (Dutch: zinloos geweld) is a term frequently used by among others the media, politicians and NGOs to define the nature of several shocking events in Belgium and the Netherlands in recent years. The use of the term is politically charged and may not reflect any unique elements of any particular crime given that label.

The term expresses the perceived senselessness of the occurred acts of violence; the perpetrator and the victim do not know each other, the violence seems not to be motivated by greed or other common factors. The violence occurs suddenly and often under the influence of alcohol.

== Origin of the term ==
The term "senseless violence", in the meaning used in this article, was first used in 1997 by Cees Bangma, district chief of the Dutch police unit Midden-Friesland. Before 1997 the term did not carry the same moral connotation in Belgian and Dutch culture, and typically referred to overseas warzone violence. Bangma used it in a letter written to the Leeuwarder Courant, a Frisian newspaper in which he made an appeal to the Dutch population to have a minute of silence for Meindert Tjoelker, who was killed on 13 September 1997. This minute was necessary "to make it clear to everyone that the Frisian society does not accept senseless violence". A wave of reactions followed, which also included media hype. As a consequence, much more attention was spent to every similar case of violence, which led to the perception that violence was on the increase.

A political group Landelijke Stichting Tegen Zinloos Geweld (national foundation against senseless violence) was created and people created the ladybug tile as a memorial or reminder against senseless violence. The group sent guest teachers to schools and sport associations, but became rather inactive since ca. 2009.

== Criticism ==
The term is often criticized. Some people think that violence is never legitimate and consider the term to be a tautology. Others say that the term has never been clearly defined and does not help to understand a particular phenomenon. Others point out that the term is or can be misused by politicians who strive for more repressive measures against crimes.

In 2016, the national newspaper NRC reported about a recent case of youngsters mistreating a homeless person. The newspaper quoted a spokesperson of the police who said that hardly any violence happens out of the blue. Criminologists have started to use the term uitgaansgeweld instead, violence occurring going out in the evening to pubs and bars. Because of the local approach there are no recent national figures about the phenomenon, according to an expert.

== Belgium ==
Documented deadly incidents include Guido Demoor, a train-driver who died after being struck on the head on an Antwerp bus by six youths he had asked to calm down, on June 24, 2006, and the death of an MIVB employee after being struck by a man in April 2012, leading to a multi-day strike by the Brussels transport services.

== Netherlands ==
- August 21, 1983: Kerwin Duinmeijer (stabbed to death in a racism related case)
- October 22, 2002: René Steegmans (beaten to death after asking respect for an elderly lady)
- December 2, 2012: Richard Nieuwenhuizen (fatally injured after serving as a volunteer linesman at a youth football match in Almere)

== See also ==
- Crime in Belgium
- Happy slapping
