= Evacuation of Arnhem =

Event during WWII

The evacuation of Arnhem (Dutch: evacuatie van Arnhem) was the departure, forcibly conducted by the German Wehrmacht, of tens of thousands of inhabitants of the Dutch city of Arnhem and nearby places from 23 to 25 September 1944 during the Battle of Arnhem in World War II. The occupying German forces decided to evacuate almost the entire civilian population in order to better defend the city against the Allied Operation Market Garden. After the city was evacuated, many houses and other buildings were looted by various groups of organised and unorganised German soldiers and pro-German collaborators.

The evacuation was conducted in an unorganised manner, and with great difficulty, demanding a heavy toll on many inhabitants, who were only allowed to take possessions of utmost necessity with them, not knowing where to go, when they would be able to return, and in which state they would find back their homes and other property (generally very bad, as would become apparent). It was not until the Allied Liberation of Arnhem on 14 April 1945 that the evacuees were theoretically allowed to return, but in practice, it was often very difficult as many homes had become uninhabitable due to war damage and plunderings. Some residents would only return in September 1945, others would never return at all.

The evacuation of Arnhem did save the lives of potentially hundreds of civilians, as it would be in the front line for several subsequent months and be shelled by enemy fire, just like the liberated city of Nijmegen on the Allied side. Nijmegen, however, was never evacuated during the five months that it was being bombarded by the Germans from the northern bank of the river Waal, due to which hundreds of Nijmegian civilians were killed. During the eventual Allied liberation of Arnhem in April 1945, much damage was done to buildings, but there were barely any civilian deaths. The only exception was the Battle of Geitenkamp (12–13 April 1945), in which a British–Canadian bombardment killed many of the last remaining residents (mostly forces labourers and NSB families).

== Background ==
The Battle of Arnhem between German and Allied forces occurred between 17 and 26 September 1944 and ended in a debacle for the Allies. The city's bridge, the capture of which was crucial for the full accomplishment of Operation Market Garden, infamously proved to be 'a bridge too far', dragging the war on for another 8 months (5 months longer than the Allied command had envisioned). The German occupiers were nevertheless thoroughly disheartened: suddenly the front had moved all the way up to the Rhine in a matter of days. On 23 September, the German Wehrmacht ordered the evacuation of the city, as well as a number of nearby places: Renkum, Heveadorp, Doorwerth, Wolfheze, Heelsum, Oosterbeek and Wageningen, and large parts of de Liemers (between the Rhine and Oude IJssel). The reasoning behind the decision was for the German army to be able to defend the city more easily against the Allied assault, in part also because of fears that the Dutch civilian population would assist the Allies. A secondary motive was to confiscate countless buildings and goods for their own use, or to compensate inhabitants of German cities bombed by Allied air raids.

== Course ==
=== Evacuation order ===
The order to evacuate was issued on Saturday 23 September by the Wehrmacht. On Sunday 24 September the leadership of the Red Cross had stenciled pamphlets affixed in the streets all around the city of Arnhem bearing the following text:

To the Population of Arnhem

On the order of the German Wehrmacht the entire population of Arnhem must evacuate, specifically: below the railway today (Sunday) and above the railway on Monday night 25 September at the latest. For the direction of evacuation recommended are towards APELDOORN and towards EDE. The population is advised to organise in small neighbourhood groups (urban residential areas) and with their own means of organisation to see to the transportation of those old of age, in need of assistance, and children. Hospitals will be evacuated as well, which the Red Cross will take care of, due to which this organisation has already been overburdened.

Everyone therefore is to take care of themselves as much as possible within their own group. A series of assistance points along the road to Apeldoorn will be established by the municipality. Everyone is to only bring along matters of the utmost necessity, this being primarily blankets, eating utensils and food supply. In connection with dangers from the air, one is advised to form small groups, equipped with white flags.

in the name of the Evacuation Commissary, the District Commissary of the Red Cross [jonkheer dr. J.N. van der Does].

=== Implementation ===
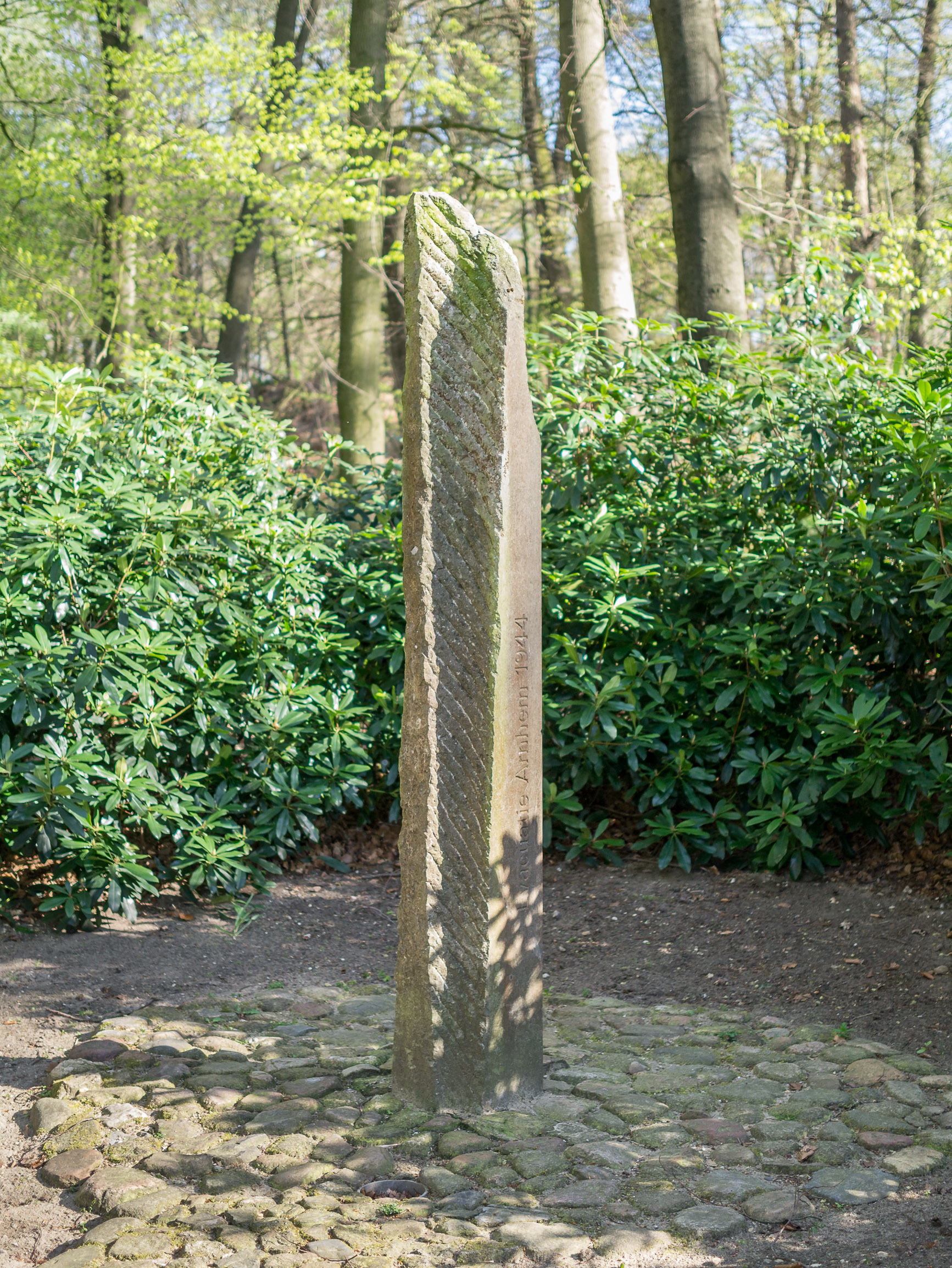
Monument in the Openluchtmuseum (erected in 1984)

Initially, there were lots of doubt about, and resistance against, the evacuation order amongst both civilians and officials; many thought, just like during Mad Tuesday (5 September 1944), that the Allied liberation would arrive very soon, and nobody knew that it would not come for another eight months (April 1945). Many civilians thought they would be returning home soon enough, or refused to leave on the presumption that the occupation would be over soon anyway. Some collaborators had already fled, including NSB burgemeester (mayor) Eugène Albert Arnold Liera who had hastily departed Arnhem on 17 September, so that the lieutenant district leader of the NSB Arjen Schermer would eventually be appointed acting mayor. Some officials in civil service continued cooperating with the occupiers (often simply in order to help civilians in the best ways they could, but in other cases for their own benefit), while other officials ceased cooperating and waited to see what would happen; still other officials proceeded to carry out acts of resistance, with all the risks associated with defying the Nazi occupation.

On 25 September 1944, on the occupier's orders, most of the Arnhem population moved northwards and westwards, usually on foot, and sometimes with a cargo bike or a small cart to bring along some possessions. The evacuees were given lodging in various towns and regions in the remaining occupied territory, from Apeldoorn, Ede, the Veluwe, all the way up to Friesland. Most civilians were received by employees of the Red Cross, who then allotted them an address to stay. The accommodation they were able to obtain was in some cases no more than a chicken coop. The Netherlands Open Air Museum near Arnhem also offered lodging to the refugees. The journey was not without dangers; at the bridge crossing the IJssel near Zwolle, a German army checkpoint had been established which arrested all men below the age of 50 for forced labour.

Estimates of the number of evacuees range from 90,000 to over 100,000 to about 150,000. After the inhabitants' departure, many homes were plundered by German occupying troops and others.

== After the war ==
After the liberation of Arnhem (codenamed Operation Anger) on 14 April 1945, refugees were gradually allowed to return home, but the repatriation efforts would continue for months. Some residents only returned in September 1945.

Only in the Geitenkamp residential area of Arnhem a relatively large group of people had stayed behind, about 900 of the 8,000 inhabitants and several thousands of forced labourers. The district was entirely closed off by barbed wire fences. During the months of evacuation, several forced labourers who refused to work for the Germans anymore were arrested and shot after being betrayed by their pro-German fellow inhabitants. After the liberation, the entire population of Geitenkamp was regularly regarded as collaborators, incorrectly and unjustly so for the majority of them.

== Commemorations ==
At the intersection of the Jansbuitensingel and the Apeldoornseweg, a monument was erected in 1995 to commemorate the evacuation of Arnhem. The inscription on the bronze plate below the plaque reads:

WEG WEG ... MAAR WAARHEEN
GEDENKTEKEN EVACUATIE ARNHEM
1944 SEPTEMBER - APRIL 1945

("Away away... but where to? Memorial Arnhem evacuation. 1944 September – April 1945.")

An annual commemoration is held at the plaque, but it is attended by relatively few people due to its impractical location, and other major commemorations of the Battle of Arnhem in September.

== Literature ==
- Horlings, André (2018). Arnhem Spookstad. Ooggetuigenverslagen van de Slag en evacuatie. Joure: Uitgeverij Sycorax. p. 180. ISBN 9789492404121.
- van Iddekinge, P. R. A. (1981). Arnhem 44/45: evacuatie, verwoesting, plundering, bevrijding, terugkeer. Arnhem: Gelderse Boekhandel & Gouda Quint. p. 380. ISBN 9060002296.

51°59′0″N 5°55′0″E
