= Battle of Nijmegen =

1944 battle in the Netherlands during WWII

- Part of Operation Market Garden in the Second World War
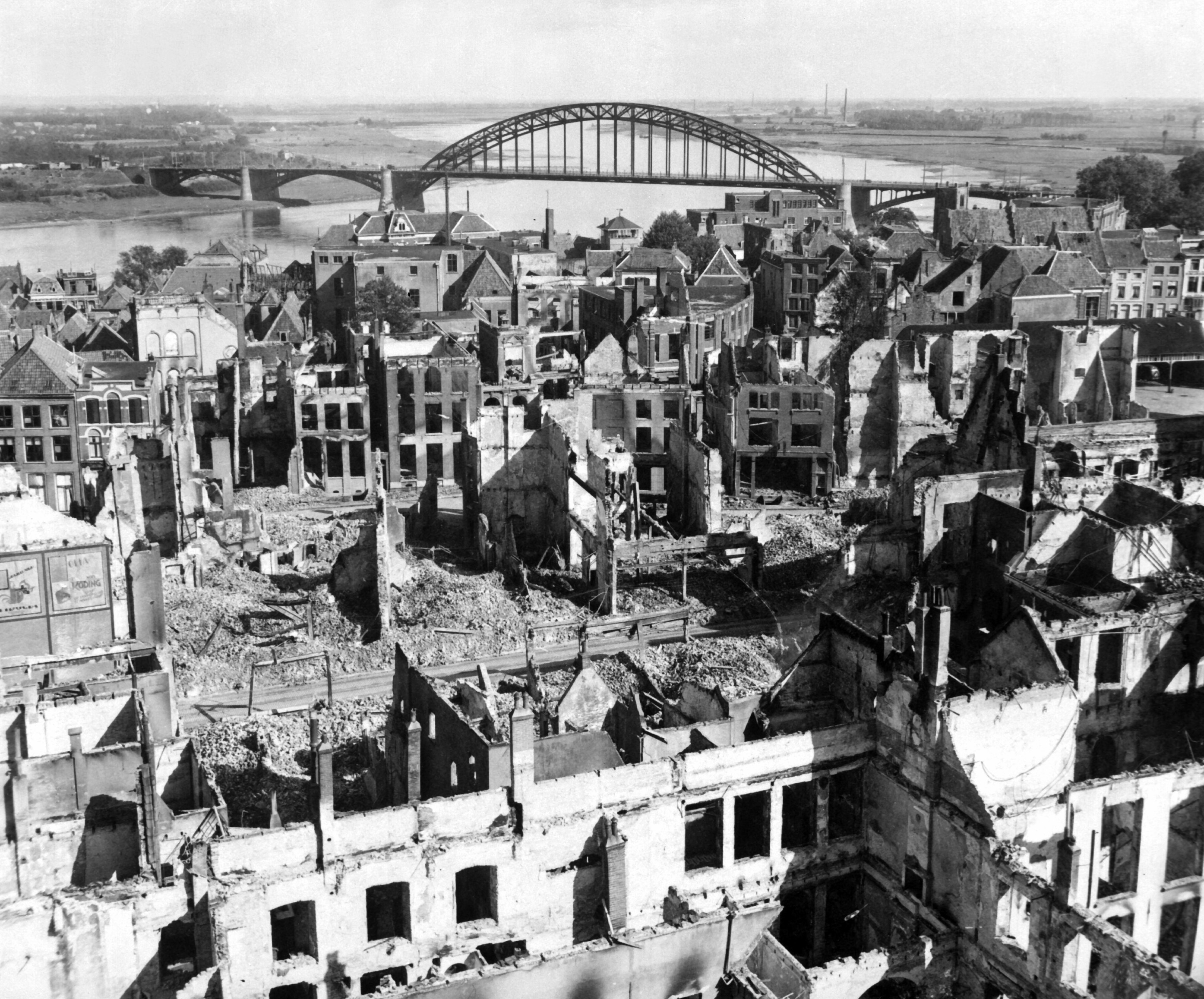
- The Waal Bridge and north-east central Nijmegen, damaged during the battle. Photo taken on 28 September 1944 from the Dominican Church.
Date	17 – 20 September 1944
Location	Nijmegen, Netherlands
Result	Allied victory

Belligerents
United States; United Kingdom	Germany

Commanders and leaders
(United States) James M. Gavin; (United States) Julian Aaron Cook; (United States) Reuben Henry Tucker III; (United Kingdom) Brian Horrocks	(Nazi Germany) Walter Model; (Nazi Germany) Leo Reinhold; (Nazi Germany) Karl-Heinz Euling; (Nazi Germany) Karl Henke

Strength
82nd Airborne Division; XXX Corps; Guards Armoured Division; (United Kingdom) 2 Spitfires	Elements; 9th SS Panzer Division; 10th SS Panzer Division; Regrouped as; Kampfgruppe Reinhold; Kampfgruppe Euling; Kampfgruppe Henke

Casualties and losses
(United Kingdom); 200–300 killed or missing; (XXX Corps/Guards Armored Division); 1 Spitfire; (United States) 150 killed; 479 wounded; 178 missing( 508th at Wyler and Beek); 200 casualties(504th Waal River & Bridge)	300+ (Waalbrug south); 267 (Railway bridge); 80 (Waalbrug north)

The Battle of Nijmegen, also known as the Liberation of Nijmegen, occurred from 17 to 20 September 1944, as part of Operation Market Garden during World War II.

The Allies' primary goal was to capture the two bridges over the Waal River at Nijmegen – the road route over the Waalbrug (Waal Bridge) and Nijmegen railway bridge – and relieve the British 1st Airborne Division and Polish 1st Independent Parachute Brigade at Arnhem, 10 miles (16 km) north of Nijmegen. The Allied infantry units at Arnhem were surrounded by German forces, and involved in heavy fighting for control of bridges over the Rhine.

Delays caused by hastily organised German reinforcements at Nijmegen ultimately led to the failure of Operation Market Garden. It took the Allies longer than expected to secure a land route to Arnhem, where the British and Polish forces were forced south of the Rhine and sustained massive casualties. In addition, fighting at Nijmegen cost hundreds of civilian lives, and caused significant damage to many buildings in the city.

== Background ==
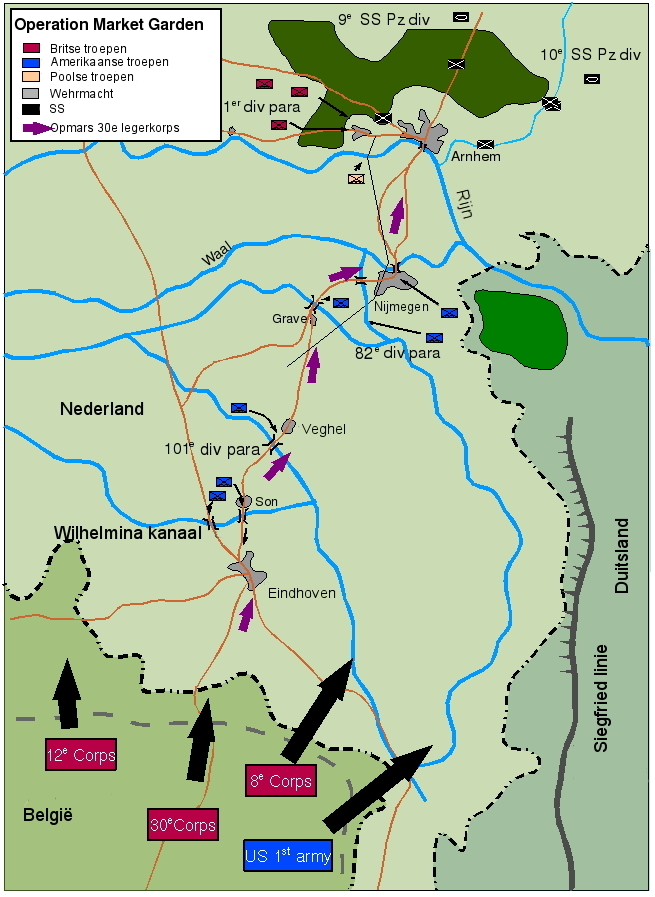
The Market Garden plan.

The River Waal at Nijmegen was an important natural barrier, which was not overarched until 1879 by the Railway Bridge, and in 1936 by the Road Bridge, commonly known as the Waal Bridge. At the time, the Waal Bridge was a remarkable feat of engineering: it was the longest tied-arch bridge in Europe. On 10 May 1940, during the German invasion of the Netherlands, the Waal Bridge had been demolished by Dutch military engineers to prevent a rapid advance of the Wehrmacht. In the course of the German occupation, the bridge was repaired, and reopened in 1943.

On 22 February 1944, the Allied Bombing of Nijmegen took place. Its intended target of opportunity was the railway station area (which the Germans used for weapons transport), but because the attack was carelessly executed, most bombs dropped on residential buildings in the city centre, killing about 800 civilians. After the fact, the Nazis seized on the incident, and focused their propaganda on it, attempting to sway popular opinion against the Allies. Their efforts failed, however, and may have even been counterproductive. On the eve of Market Garden, most Nijmegeners were passionately awaiting Allied liberation, despite the bombardment.

That liberation seemed imminent when in late August Heeresgruppe B collapsed in Normandy and made a rushed, chaotic retreat to Germany, leaving the Allies to capture Northern France and Belgium in a matter of days. Reports spread that the British had conquered Brussels and Antwerp on 3 and 4 September, and allegedly –but incorrectly– Breda as well. This gave rise to a euphoric ambiance throughout the Netherlands on the next day, later known as Mad Tuesday, when one exaggerated rumour after another fed the hope that liberation would occur in a matter of hours. However, the German forces managed to regroup, and would not be driven out of the Netherlands without a fight. British general Montgomery then designed the ambitious plan Market Garden, to surprise the Germans by the deployment of airborne forces. These would quickly seize several crucial bridges across major rivers, after which the heavy armour could advance straight through the Netherlands, along Eindhoven, Nijmegen and Arnhem, and reach the Ruhr, where a vital part of Germany's war industry was located. The airborne landings were given the codename "Market," and the ground force operation was given codename "Garden." The airborne drop would capture the bridges, and the ground forces would be the main invasion. The airborne drop would secure the bridges that were vulnerable to being blown up by the Germans and protect the invasion route. The operation may have been sufficient to finish the war before the end of 1944.

== Preparation ==
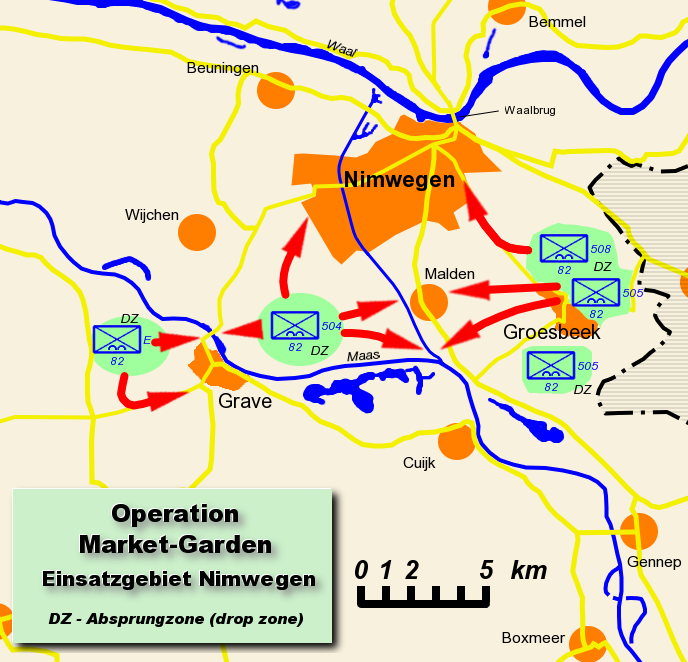
82nd Division drop zones near Nijmegen.

The success of Market Garden depended on the timely and intact capture of a number of bridges in the southeastern Netherlands by American, British, Polish and Canadian airborne forces. These were to clear the way, Highway 69 or later nicknamed "Hell's Highway"– from Belgium to the north Neder Rhine bank for the advance of the heavily armed British XXX Corps (supported by the Guards Armoured Division), consisting of dozens of Sherman tanks and artillery. If this firepower could be moved across all major Dutch rivers in time, Germany might be defeated and the war ended before 1945.

The 82nd Airborne Division – comprising the 504th, 505th and 508th Parachute Infantry Regiments (PIRs)– commanded by Brigadier General James Gavin, was tasked with taking all of the bridges between Grave and Arnhem. The bridges in question were the Grave Bridge, four bridges spanning the Maas–Waal Canal, the Railway Bridge and, most importantly of all, the Waal Bridge near Nijmegen. The 82nd's main body and the 504th PIR would land north and south of Grave to capture the first 5 bridges, while the 505th and 508th PIRs would jump at Groesbeek to secure the vital Groesbeek Heights to block any German counterattacks from the Klever Reichswald, to advance towards Nijmegen and lastly to occupy the Waal Bridge.

== Course of the battle ==
=== The Grave, Canal and Road (Waal) bridges ===
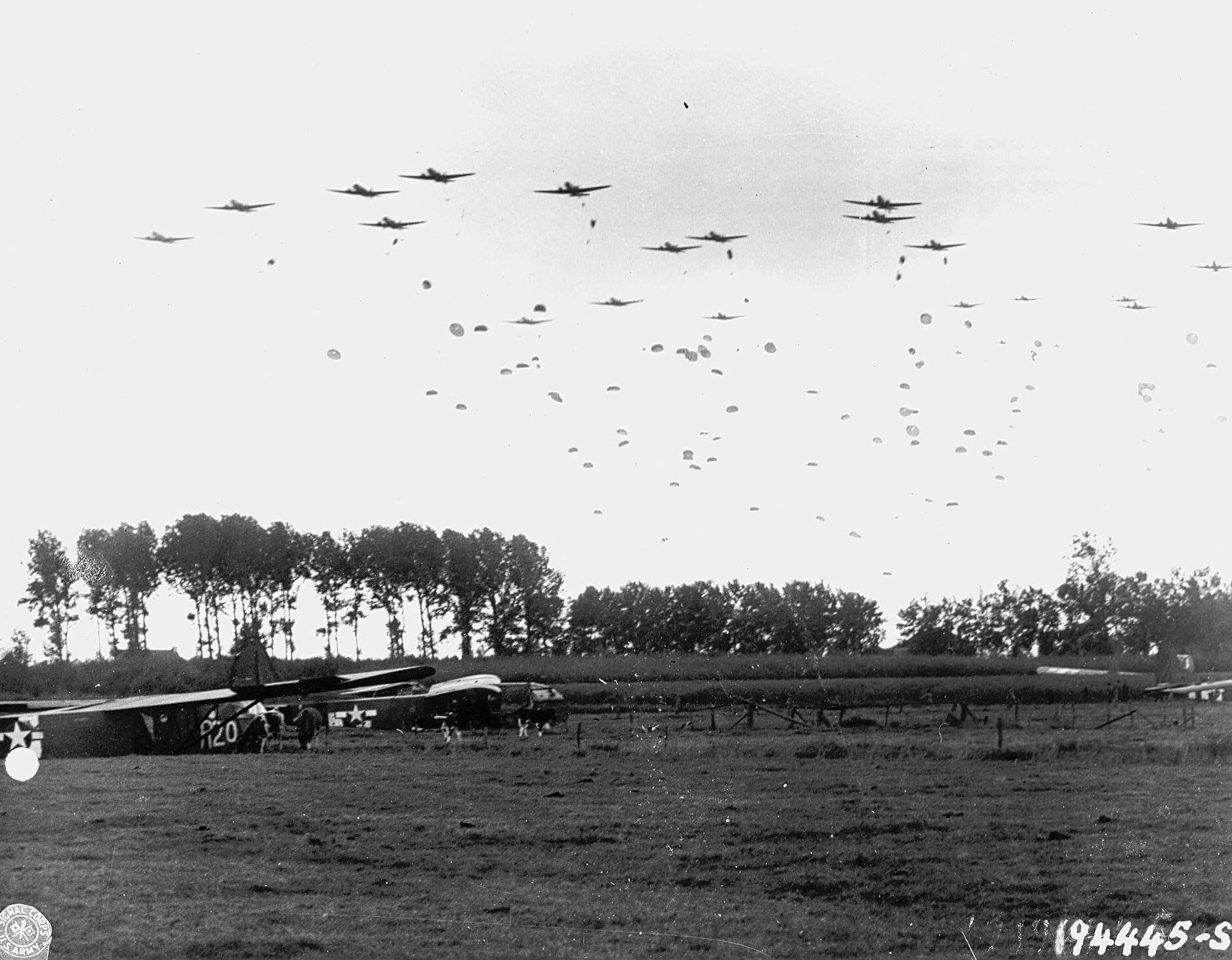
The 82nd Division drops near Grave.

On 17 September at 12:30, Companies D, E and F of the 504th PIR (placed under the 82nd Division for the operation) were dropped near the Grave Bridge, which was seized and defended successfully against German counterattacks after a two to three hour firefight. The 1st Battalion of the 504th, led by Major Harrison, had to seize the four Canal bridges, designated as no. 7, 8, 9 and 10. Bridge 8 was destroyed by the Germans at 16:15; Bridge 9 near Hatert was blown up at 20:15 as well; but at 19:00, Bridge 7 near Heumen was captured by the Americans. At around 02:30 on 18 September, Companies F, D and HQ occupied Grave without any resistance; they waited until the arrival of the British XXX Corps, which came at 08:30.

At about 18:00 on 17 September, the 1st Battalion, 508th PIR (1/508th) left its half-dug trenches at Groesbeek and advanced towards Nijmegen to take the Road Bridge. Ironically, this particular initiative may have resulted from miscommunication between Gavin and Colonel Roy E. Lindquist, commander of 1/508th PIR, allowing a delayed advance on the bridge giving German troops enough time to occupy the bridge. The 82nd Division's own website states:

"Immediately after the landing, Gavin ordered Colonel Lindquist's 508th regiment to head for the bridge along the east side of the city, avoiding the built-up area. But due to a misunderstanding, Lindquist thought he was to advance only after he secured his other objectives. As a result, he moved towards Nijmegen late in the afternoon through the built-up area which Gavin had wanted him to avoid. The surprise effect of his attack was lost. German troops (some from Gräbner's squadron) prevented the Americans from taking the bridge."

=== March on Nijmegen ===
==== 17 September: battle of Keizer Karelplein ====
Around 22:00, Companies A and B of 1/508th advanced, whilst C waited. Company A was guided by a member of the Dutch resistance for about 8 km until a crossroads at the southern end of Nijmegen, where he suddenly disappeared and was never seen again. After long waiting, the American soldiers decided to march on. Several blocks before the Keizer Karelplein, a platoon came under fire by a German machine gun, which, however, was soon taken out. On the square, a major firefight broke out: German soldiers shot at the paratroopers from the square's centre and the houses surrounding it.

Both the Germans and the Americans received reinforcements (the latter first Company B 1/508th, later other companies). However, when the German 406th Infantry Division attacked the landing zones near Groesbeek in the morning of 18 September, almost the entire 1/508th was pulled back. Only Company G 3/508th stayed in town in an attempt to capture the Road Bridge anyway. They relinquished the Keizer Karelplein, and tried a more eastern route, systematically cleaning up every German guard post underway, and almost reaching the bridge.

==== Waal Bridge not demolished ====
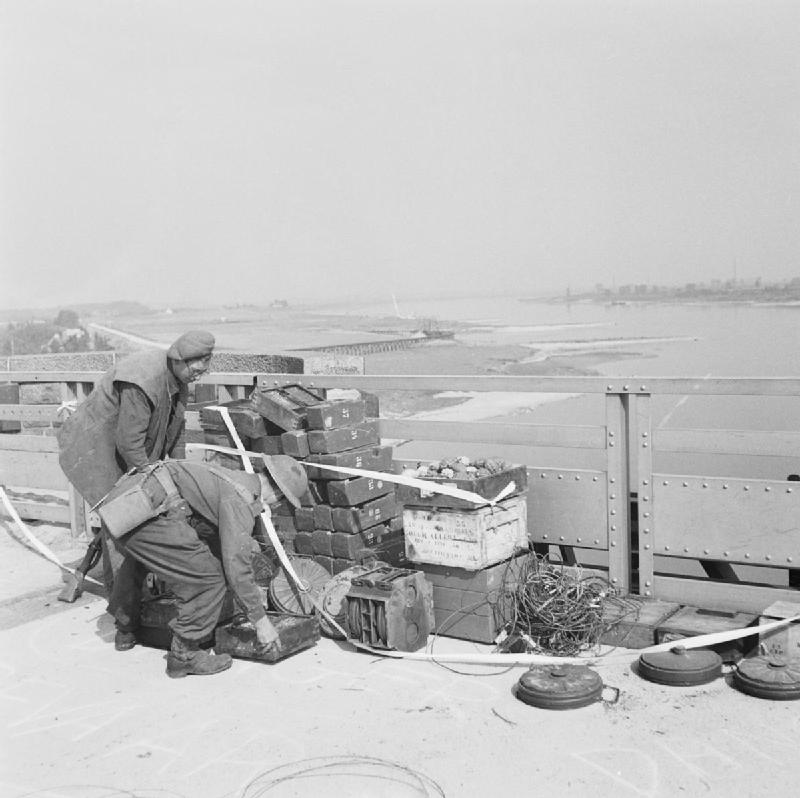
British soldiers dismantle German explosives on the Waal Bridge.

The Allies' greatest fear was that the Germans would blow up the Road Bridge, which would render Market Garden a failure. Indeed, the Germans had already installed explosives on the bridge, ready to be detonated when that would be deemed necessary, but this never happened during the entire battle. Generalfeldmarschall Walter Model, commander of the German forces in the Netherlands, counted on an Allied defeat at Arnhem. This meant the bridge could still be of use for a large-scale counteroffensive, and so it was not destroyed on 17 September. On 18 September, resistance member Jan van Hoof allegedly sabotaged the explosives, but this remains uncertain. However, when he was arrested and executed by the Germans the next day, he was soon heroised as the "Saviour of the Waal Bridge". An official investigation after the war concluded the Germans would have had enough time to charge the bridge with explosives once more and demolish it anyway; however, they again did not do so out of strategic considerations. According to another hypothesis, the Germans supposedly failed to blow up the bridge on 20 September, because the ignition system malfunctioned.

==== 18 September: German reinforcements ====
On 18 September, Model sent reinforcements from Arnhem to keep the Waal Bridge out of the Allies' hands. Because elements of the British 1st Airborne Division were still in control of the Arnhem bridge at the time, the 1. Kompagnie SS-Panzer-Pionier-Abteilung commanded by SS-Untersturmführer Werner Baumgärtel and the 2. Bataillon SS-Panzergrenadier-Regiment 19 under leadership of SS-Hauptsturmführer Karl-Heinz Euling crossed the Rhine at Pannerden as the 500 man strong 'Kampfgruppe Euling', used the still intact Waal Bridge and dug in at the Hunnerpark. These reinforcements enabled the SS to regroup under the command of Sturmbannführer Leo Reinhold, who set up his headquarters on the north Waal bank. Fallschirmjäger Oberst Henke prepared the Railway Bridge's defences. The two roundabouts and beltway were reinforced during the next 48 hours. The Americans would have to wait for the XXX Corps' help in taking the bridges, even though according to the planning, they should have been captured before the British arrival.

==== 19 September: battle of Keizer Lodewijkplein ====
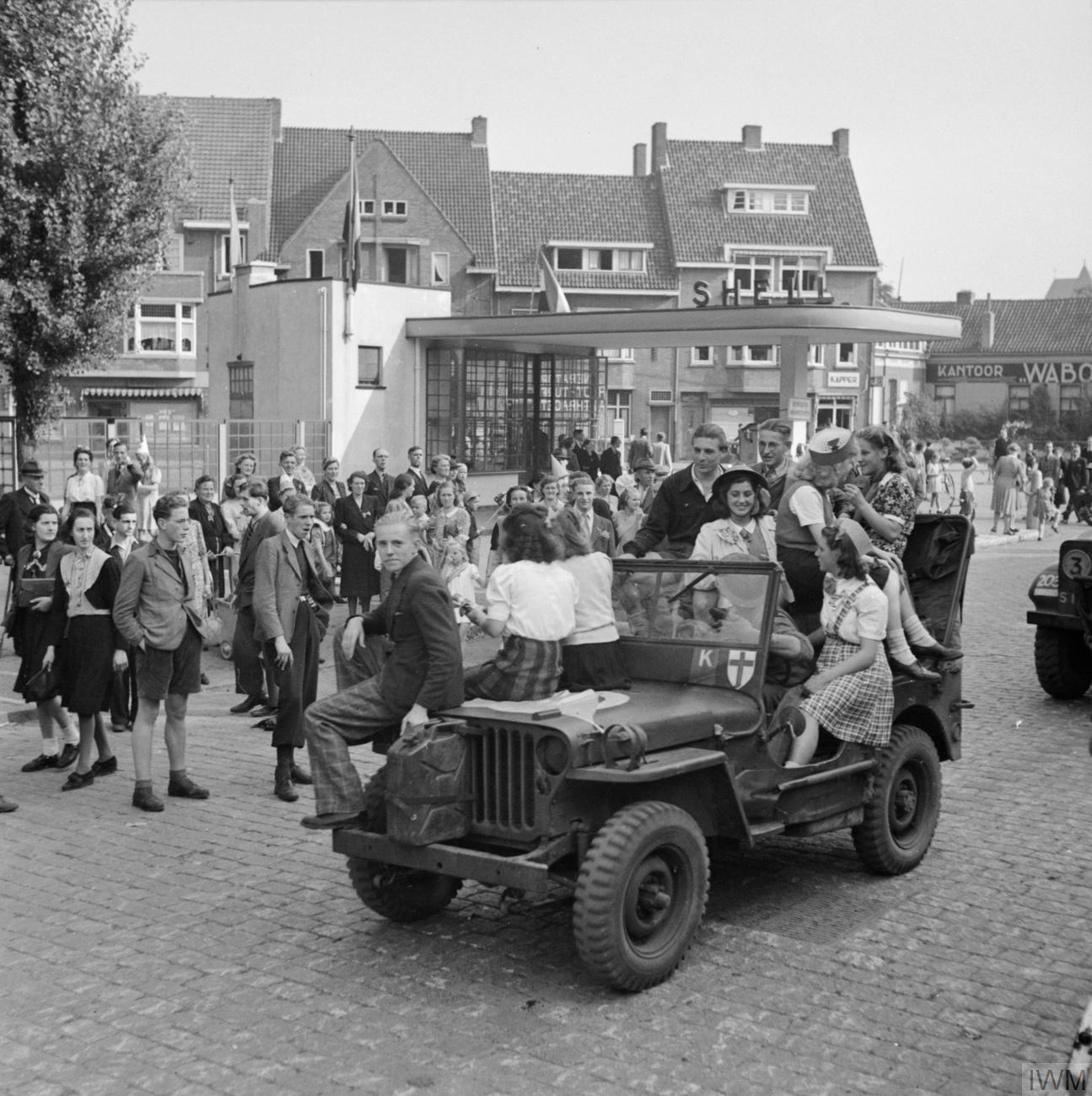
Nijmegian civilians ride along on a jeep during the advance (20 Sept.).

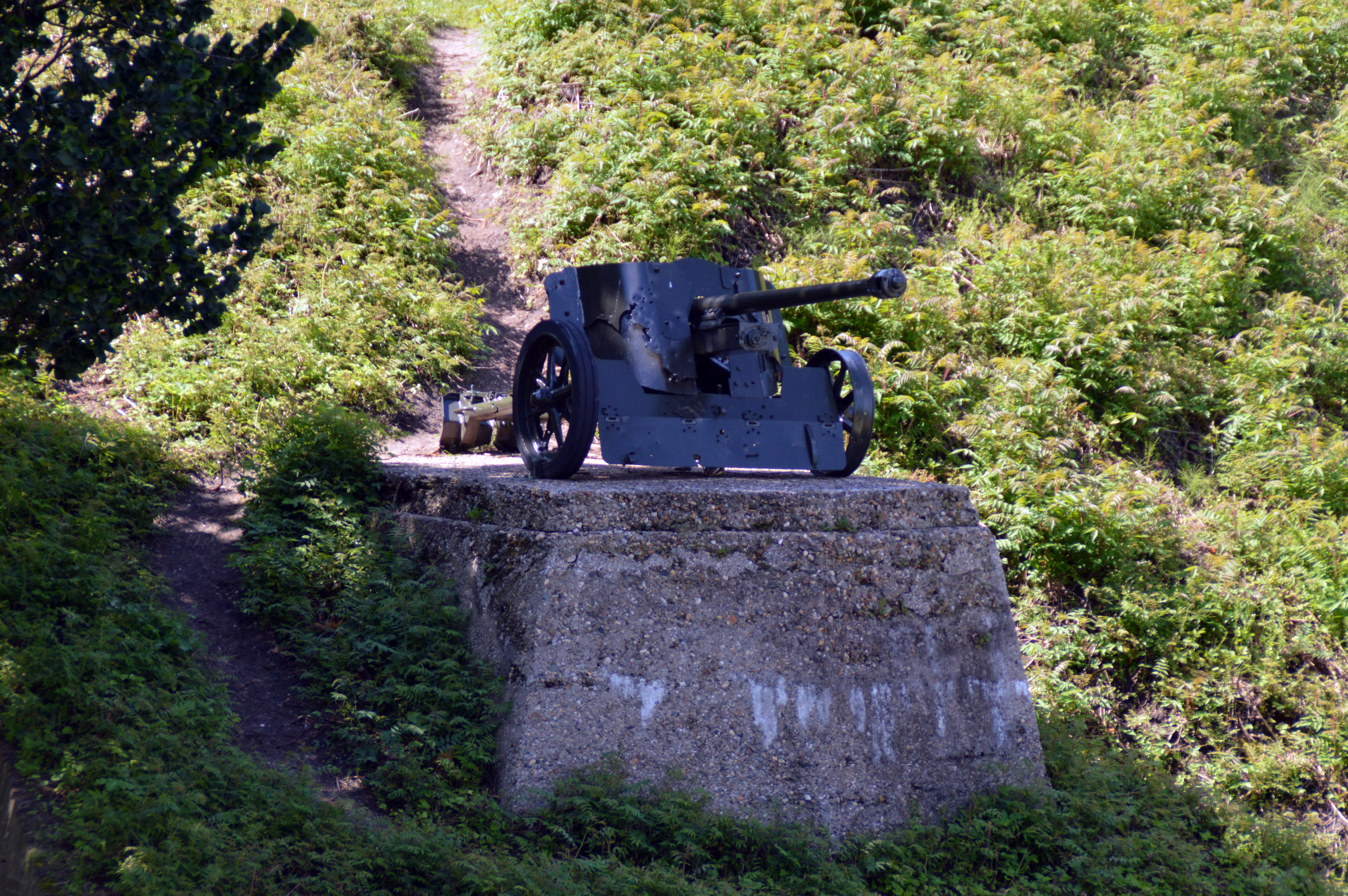
This German anti-tank gun was used in the battle of the Hunnerpark.

The British and American commanders Browning (British 1st Airborne Corps), Gavin (82nd Airborne Division), Horrocks (XXX Corps) and Adair (British Guards Armoured Division) held a meeting in the morning of 19 September in Molenhoek to determine their strategy. The binational force was split in two groups: the western group would take the Railway Bridge, and the eastern group the Road Bridge. The arrival of the British gave Gavin the necessary sense of security to send some of his troops from the Groesbeek Heights to join the assault.

At 16:00, the Anglo-American combat forces moved into town, resulting in a heavy firefight at the Keizer Lodewijkplein. The British tanks and armour exchanged fire with the German anti-tank cannons and infantry entrenched at the Valkhof fortress, while the American paratroopers fortified themselves in residential buildings on the square's south side. Meanwhile, heavy German artillery bombarded the attackers from Lent across the river Waal.

Soon it became apparent that a mere head-on assault on the German positions might take several more days. However, the Allies did not have that much time to spare in relieving the British troops in Arnhem. It necessitated capturing the north end of both bridges to isolate the German forces on the south bank. To accomplish this, infantry would have to cross the river under fire. The 3rd Battalion, 504th PIR crossed the Heumen bridge in the evening of 19 September, and set up camp in the Jonkerbos at 21:15. Brigadier General Gavin ordered Major Julian Cook to find boats to cross the Waal. Initially, Cook had no idea where to get them. Eventually, canvas boats had to be transported from Belgium, delaying the Waal crossing by a day. Originally, these would be 32 boats, but underway a truck carrying six boats was destroyed, and so only 26 reached their destination.

==== 20 September: battle of Nijmegen centre ====
To make the river crossing a success, a renewed attack on the bridge's south sides was needed to divert the enemy's attention and firepower. Nijmegen's city centre had to be swept clean systematically first, block by block. This operation began in the morning of 20 September at 08:30, succeeding unexpectedly quickly. The occupying force was easily pushed back, as long as it could delay the Allies. Much of the combat took place on rooftops, where paratroopers rapidly hopped from one rooftop to the next. Only in the Kronenburgerpark, where the elite SS troops of Kampfgruppe Henke had a clear field of fire, did the advance go slowly. Meanwhile, the II. Fallschirmjäger Corps of General Eugen Meindl charged the US formations at Groesbeek and Mook, but failed to force a breakthrough.

=== 20 September 15:00 : Waal Crossing ===
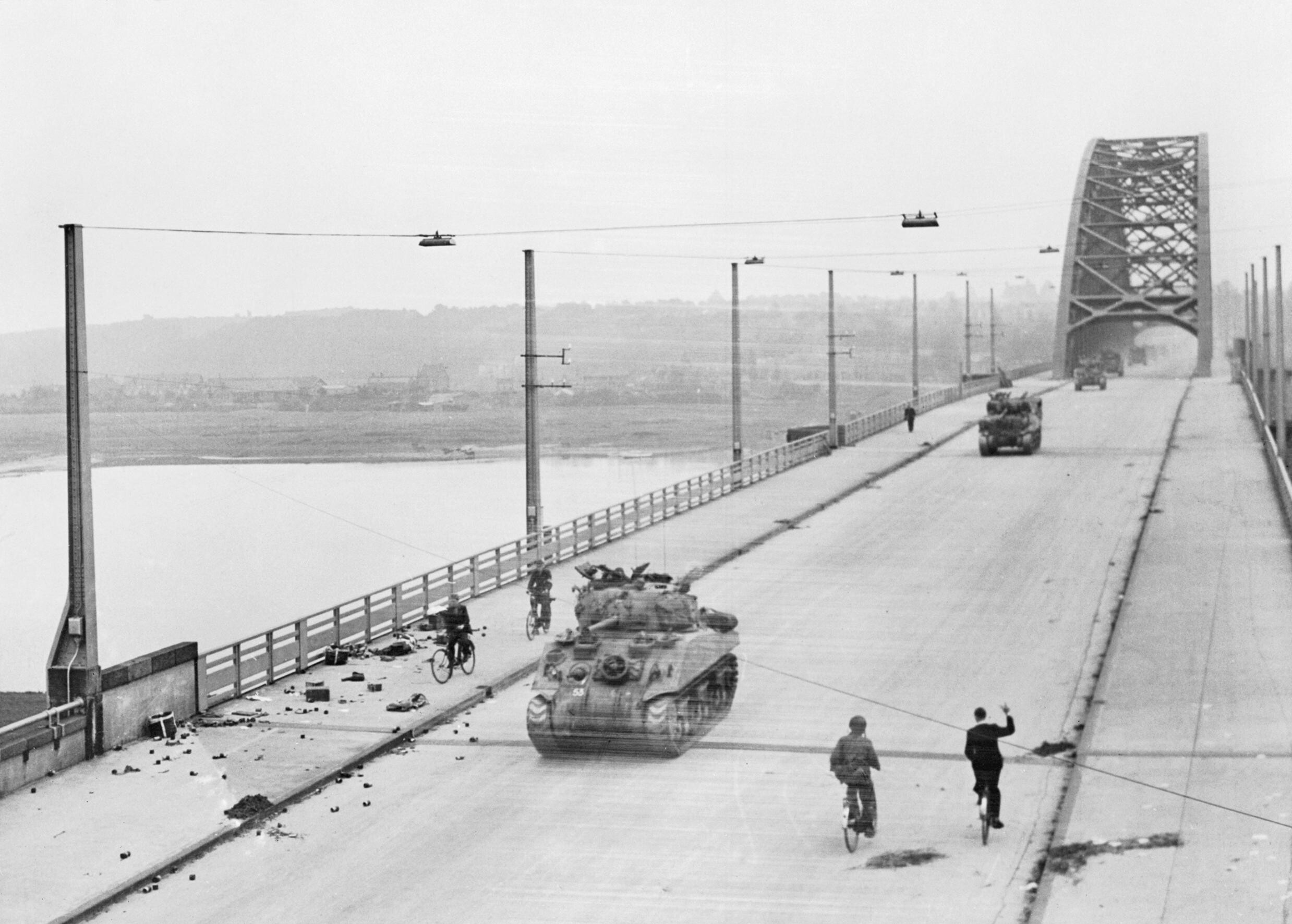
When the British XXX Corps could finally cross the Waal Bridge, it was too late to relieve Arnhem.

The planned crossing at 8:00 had to be delayed time and again because of logistical problems: the supply of canvas boats by truck from Belgium was difficult, since the road was narrow and constantly blocked by burnt-out vehicles. The crossing began at 15:00, about two kilometres downstream from the Waal Bridge, near the old Gelderland Power Plant. Two British Spitfires were to provide air support, but flak shot one down, after which the other returned to England. The men of the 3/504th were fired on by German tanks, artillery and small arms, suffering many losses (48 paratroopers were killed with several dozens more were wounded). Some boats capsized or sank during the crossing. Despite the losses, at least 16 boats survived the initial crossing. A field telephone line was laid on the riverbed for communication across the river. In several waves, most of the assault force from 3/504th got across the river.

By the late afternoon, 3/504th had taken the northern end of the railway bridge, and began preparations for a German counterattack. Instead, however, at dusk about 200 to 300 German soldiers approached the Americans to surrender. Around the same time, the Waal Bridge's northern end was seized by another group after heavy fighting. The 1st Battalion then relieved the 3rd to guard the railway bridge. The British tanks and artillery on the south bank of the Waal were running short of ammunition. This and unforeseen delays in supply deprived XXX Corps of the munitions required to complete its advance to the Rhine. In the battle for the Waal Bridge in the Hunnerpark and on the Keizer Lodewijkplein, over 300 of Kampfgruppe Euling's 500 soldiers were killed, sixty were taken prisoner and the rest escaped.

== Aftermath ==
=== March halted ===
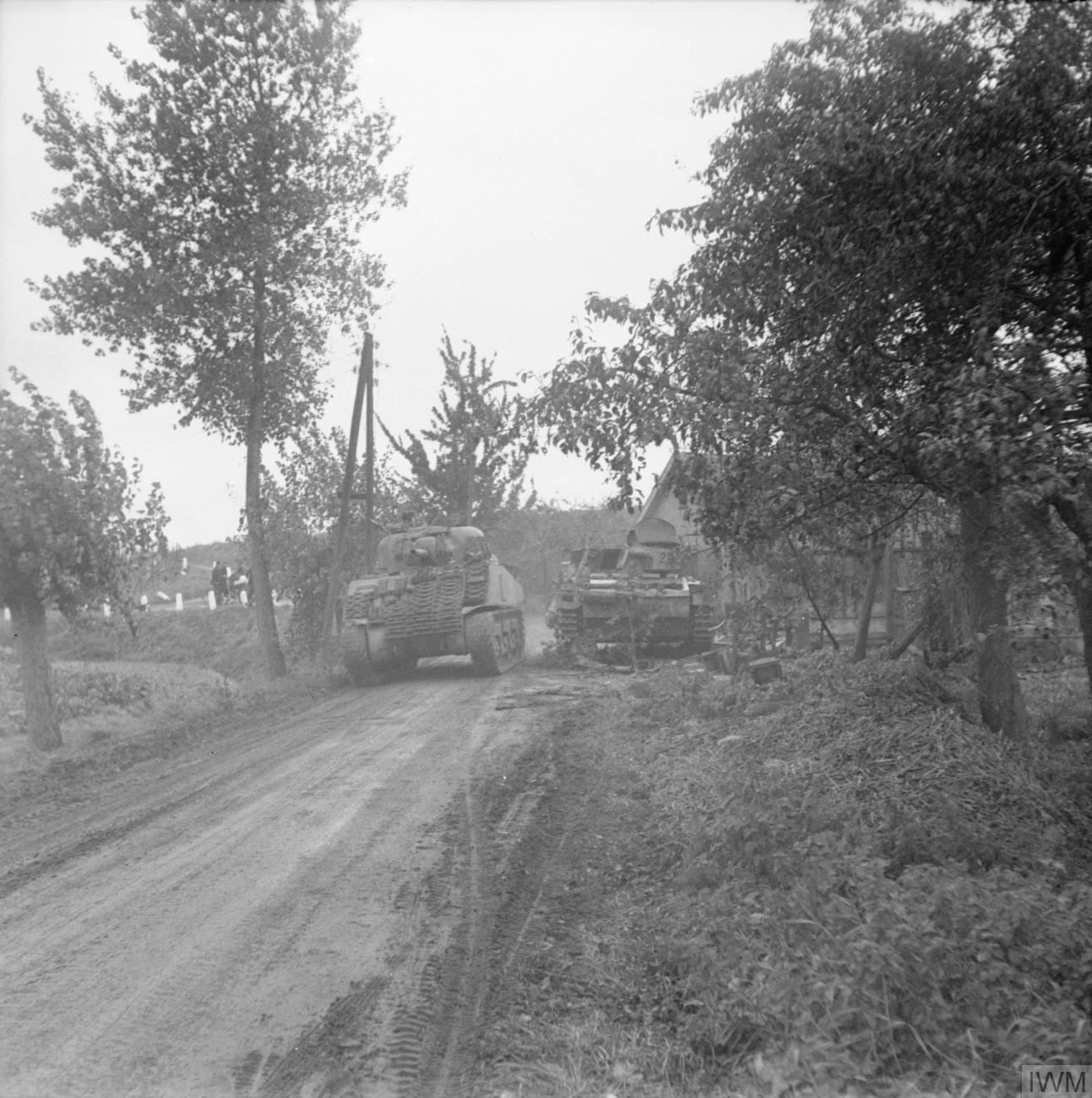
British Sherman tank passes a knocked-out German Panzer III in Oosterhout (27 Sept).

Around the same time the Nijmegen bridges were captured, the British paratroopers under John Frost had to surrender the northern end of the Arnhem Bridge to the Germans. A rapid advance from Nijmegen to Arnhem to retake the bridge, was blocked by a combination of factors, including sunset, unfamiliarity with the terrain ahead (the Betuwe), German reinforcements near Ressen coming from Arnhem (three Tiger tanks and two infantry companies), ongoing firefights and chaos in Nijmegen, and continuous logistical problems on "Hell's Highway", due to events such as the German counterattacks near Veghel. The march of XXX Corps was delayed for another 18 hours after the Waal Bridge's conquest, but eventually it was so worn out after five days of combat, that the offensive could not be resumed. On 21 September, a battle near Elst obstructed further progress of the XXX Corps and the Guards Armoured Division on the road to Arnhem.

The 43rd (Wessex) Infantry Division played an important role on 22 September by creating a side corridor to Oosterbeek (where the British parachutists under Roy Urquhart had fortified themselves against a superior German enemy that vastly outnumbered them) via Driel (just liberated by the Polish 1st Independent Parachute Brigade under Stanisław Sosabowski). Attempts were made to still turn the Battle of Arnhem into an Allied success now that the forces were linked up, but these were thwarted on 23 September. On 24 September, the XXX Corps' generals decided in the Valburg Conference to abandon Market Garden, pull the troops out of Arnhem, and let the frontline fall back to Nijmegen. Remaining British troops tried to escape to the south, or hide in occupied territory. During Operation Berlin (25–26 September), more than 2,400 of them were evacuated with Canadian help. Operation Pegasus (22–23 October) managed to save another 100.

=== Nijmegen front city ===
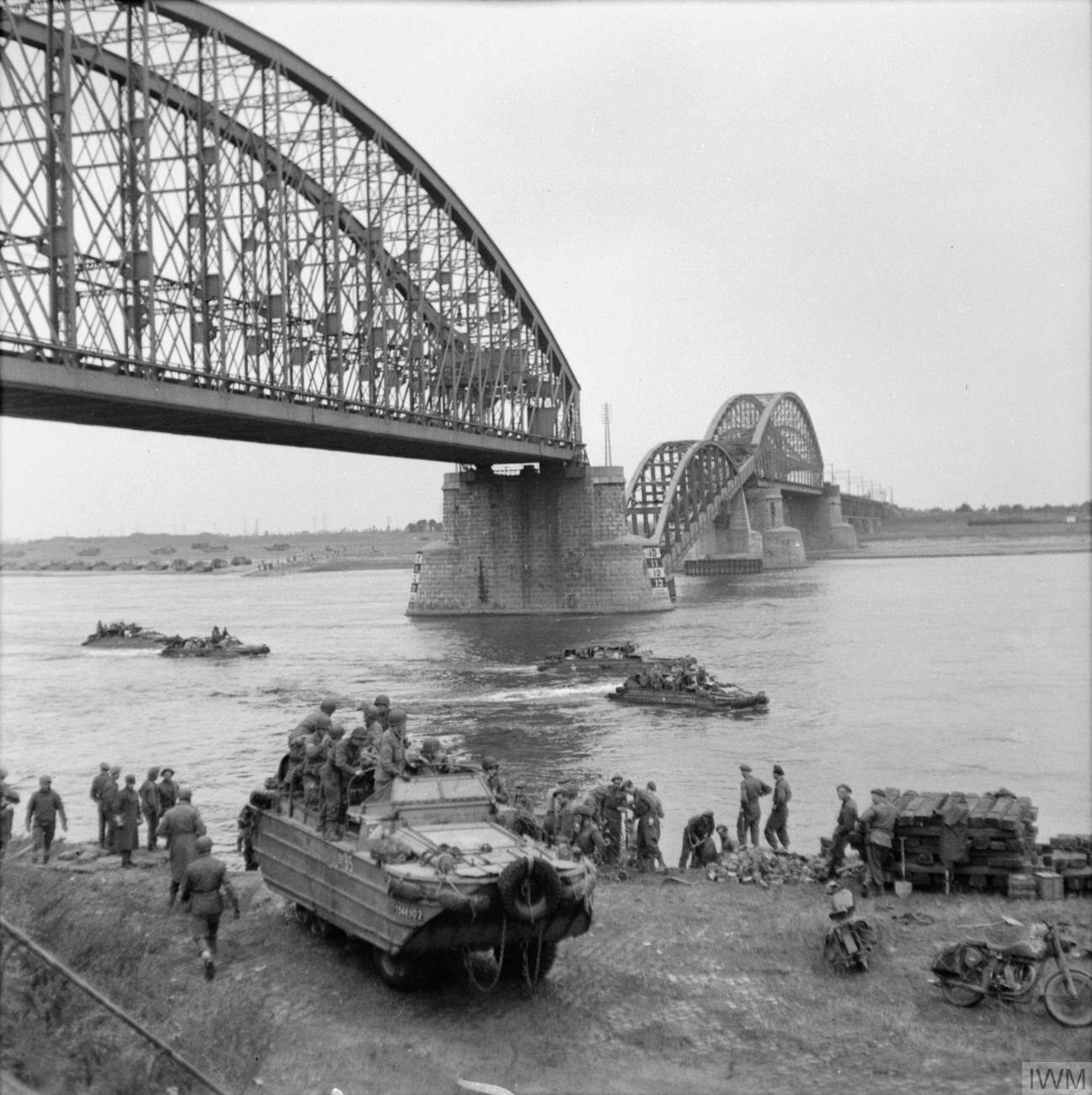
The Railway Bridge sabotaged by Kampfschwimmer (30 Sept.). (Note: The photograph shows DUKWS from 536 Company RASC commanded by Major Preston John Hurman. Page 6 of his company diary written by Captain Parker records this event.)

After the Allied withdrawal from Arnhem and the Betuwe, the front line returned to Nijmegen, that was bombarded for the next five months. Historians wonder why Nijmegen was not evacuated like Arnhem by the Germans on 23 September – which could have prevented hundreds of civilian casualties. The German forces tried to destroy the Waal Bridge on several occasions in numerous ways but they failed every time. The best attempt took place on 29 September, just before 17:30. A group of German Kampfschwimmer ("combat swimmers") put floating mines on both bridges, managing to destroy the middle section of the Railway Bridge and blowing a hole in the road deck of the Road Bridge. The latter was saved with a British bailey bridge. The Germans counter-attacked the Nijmegen salient from 30 September to 8 October but were repulsed with many losses.

=== Political revolution ===
On 17 September NSB burgemeester Marius van Lokhorst and the more moderate NSB locum burgemeester Hermanus Hondius were put out of office by the Allies. Hondius fled to Arnhem, whilst Van Lokhorst had already fled to Groningen around Mad Tuesday. Petrus van der Velden was installed as the new burgemeester on 19 September. This aroused a lot of criticism from the Nijmegeners, because during his previous tenure as burgemeester (1 May 1942 – 24 February 1943) he had complied more with the commands of the German occupiers than his predecessor. On 16 October 1944, he was succeeded by Charles Hustinx, who remained burgemeester of Nijmegen until 1 January 1968.

The Supreme Court of the Netherlands, which the Germans temporarily moved from The Hague to Nijmegen in 1943, was partially purged after the liberation. Justice Minister Gerrit Jan van Heuven Goedhart, who still resided in London, ordered the dismissal of all pro-Nazi judges appointed by the Germans, but also the temporary suspension of all other judges of the Supreme Court, including those who had already been appointed before the war, which was unconstitutional. Although Nijmegen had been liberated, most judges who were fired by the Zuivering-Decree were still in occupied areas, leading to a complex legal situation.

=== Historiography and memory ===
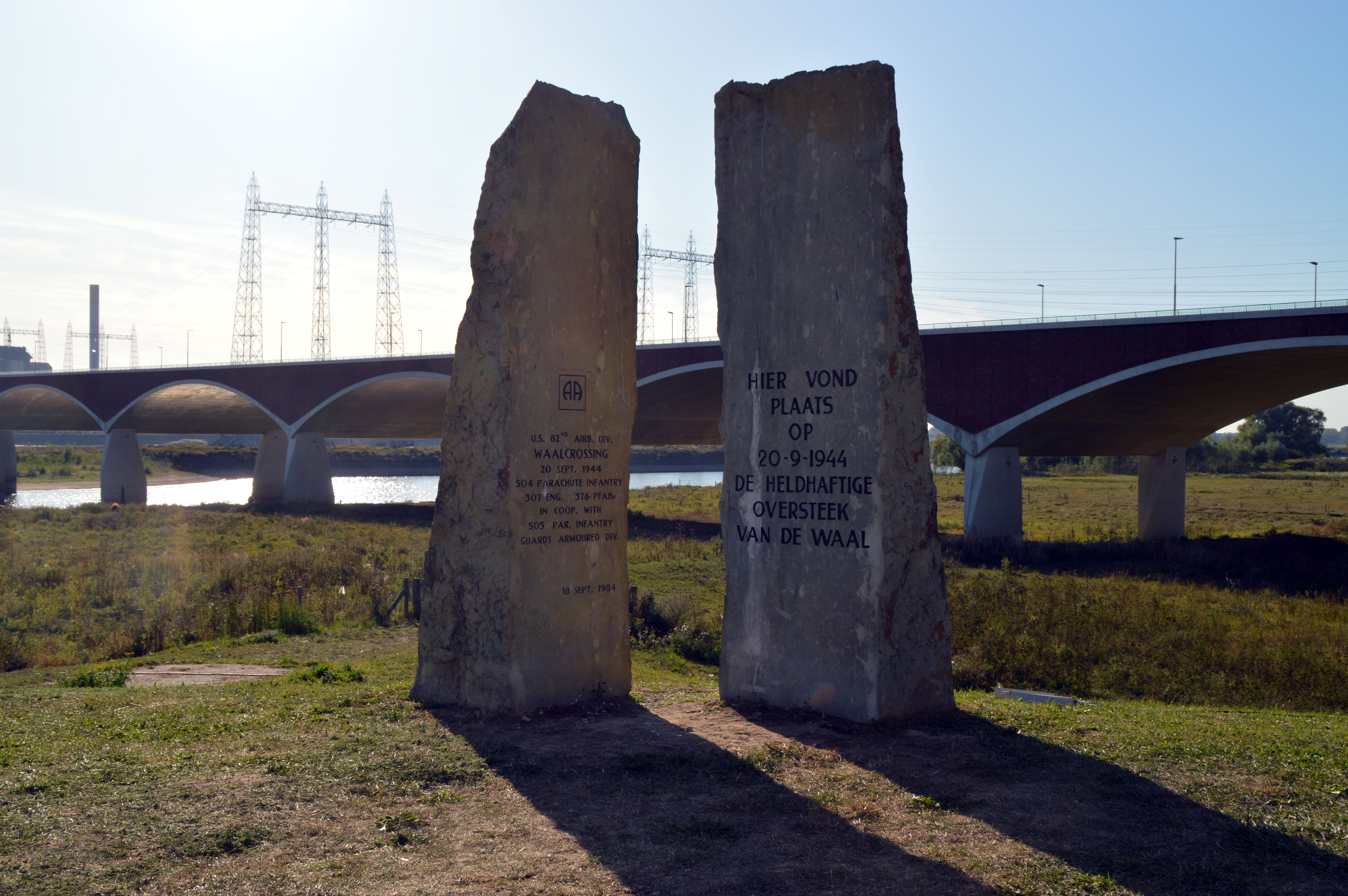
Waalcrossing monument

"I have no idea what Nijmegen used to look like; there was probably quite a sweet old part to the city, judging from some of the ruins (...) but due to uninterrupted shelling for a month or more the place looks now as if it had been abandoned years ago, following an earthquake and a flood. Today Nijmegen is a town where people sleep in cellars and walk with care on the streets, listening hard for incoming shells."
Martha Gellhorn, October 1944

During the Battle of Nijmegen, there were only two reporters with the 82nd Airborne Division at hotel Sionshof, and they were both busy covering the actions on the Groesbeek Heights. Therefore, contemporary British and American press did not pay much attention to what was happening in Nijmegen, which had to be reconstructed from other sources later.

Historian Joost Rosendaal found out that the Bombing of Nijmegen of 22 February 1944 has been registered in collective memory much more clearly than the liberation and the five months as a front line city, even though these caused roughly the same number of casualties. The city suffered about 7% (over two thousand) of all war deaths in the Netherlands, which is far out of proportion. Moreover, many of the fallen were not commemorated officially for many years, because they were 'pointless' civilian casualties; the nationalistic commemorations preferred to give attention to 'heroic sacrifices' such as soldiers and resistance members who 'died for the fatherland'.

In the course of the war, 10,000 Nijmegeners were wounded, 5,500 of whom were permanently disabled. 5,000 houses (nearly a quarter) were destroyed, and another 13,000 homes were more or less heavily damaged. With 12,000 homeless people and another 3,000 evacuees from the surrounding areas, there was an extreme post-war housing crisis.
