= Kronenburgerpark =

Park in Nijmegen, the Netherlands

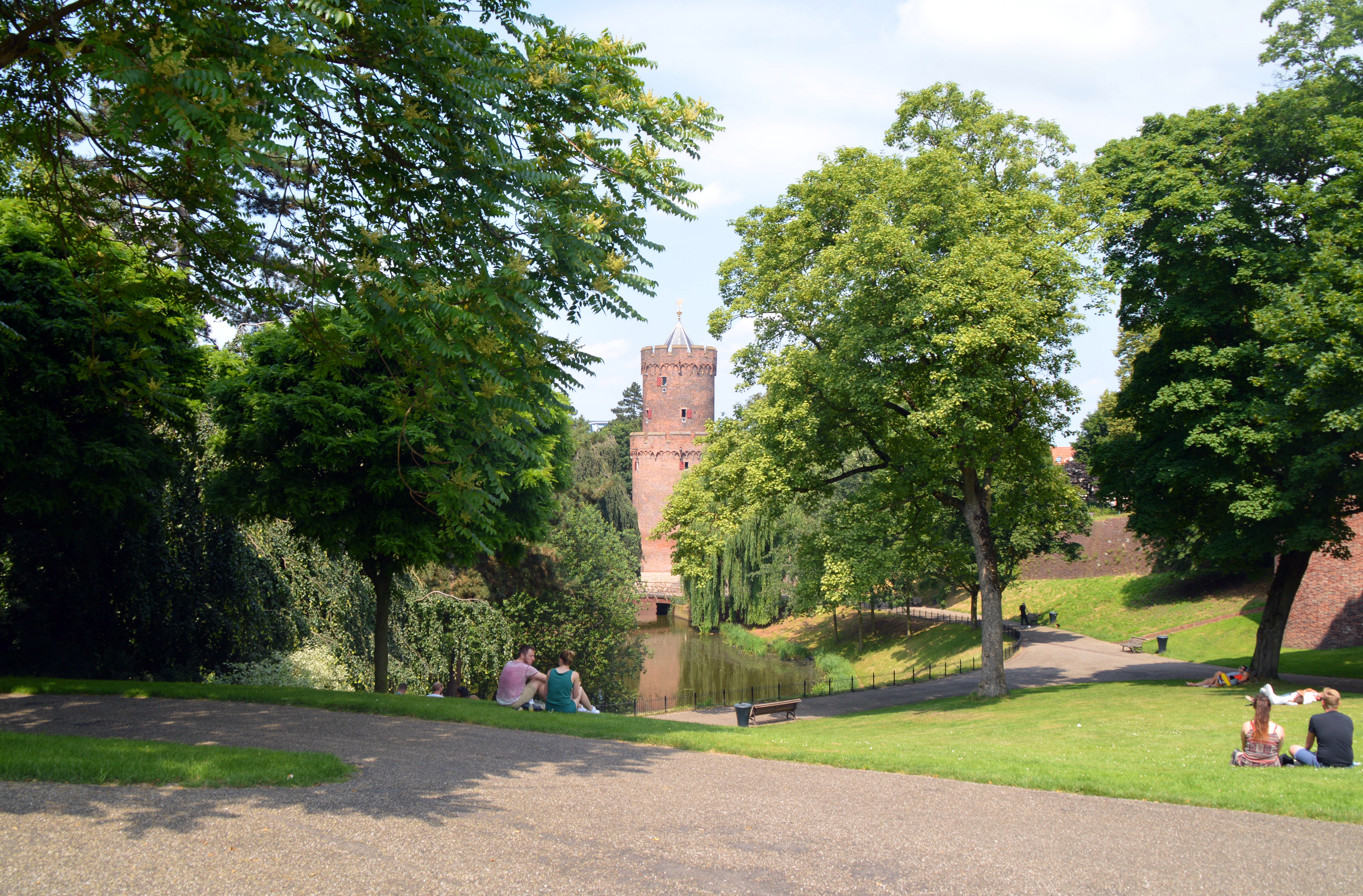
- Kronenburgerpark
- Interactive map of Kronenburgerpark
- Type: Public park
- Location: Nijmegen, Netherlands
- Coordinates: 51°50′46″N 5°51′27″E
- Area: ?
- Created: 1882
- Status: Open year round

The Kronenburgerpark is a park in the center of Nijmegen, the Netherlands. It is close to the Central Railway Station and the Lange Hezelstraat. Where the park touches the Parkweg are the remains of the medieval walls with the Kruittoren (powder tower) (built around 1425).

== History ==
After Nijmegen lost the status of fortified town in the Vestingwet (Constitution) (1874), the demolition of the fortifications started in 1876 and plans were made for the Explanation or expansion of the city. In 1880, the Utrecht garden architect Hendrik Copijn presented his plan for a city park to the west of the old town, where the entire city wall would be demolished. This plan did not make it. The garden and landscape architect Liévin Rosseels from Leuven came in 1881 with a new design that was approved. He laid the Kronenburgerpark in 1881–82 just outside the old city walls, between the Parkweg and the new Kronenburgersingel. He was advised in this by builder Pierre Cuypers, who restored the Powder Tower from 1878 to 1883 and put a major stamp on the decision to keep the city wall and to take it into the park.

In the park there is a limestone statue of the Lion, which was donated in 1886 by the Nijmegen embellishment association. The design came from the hand of Henri Leeuw sr. And his son Henri Leeuw jr.

The park, sung in a song by Frank Boeijen under the title "Kronenburg Park" (1985), was known as a hangout for prostitutes and drug addicts. After a radical reorganization, the park was given the appearance in 2005 of a quiet, modern city park.

== Situation ==
Down in the park there is a pond, consisting of two parts separated by a bridge. At the top of the park there is a small playground for young children and a petting zoo. Fallow deer, land goats, peacocks and chickens are among the permanent residents. The park also occasionally houses animals temporarily, especially in the summer. In 2012, for example, the park hosted two donkeys, and in 2013 a small herd of Ouessant sheep.

== National monument ==
The Kronenburgerpark is a national monument and bears number 522957.

== Gallery ==
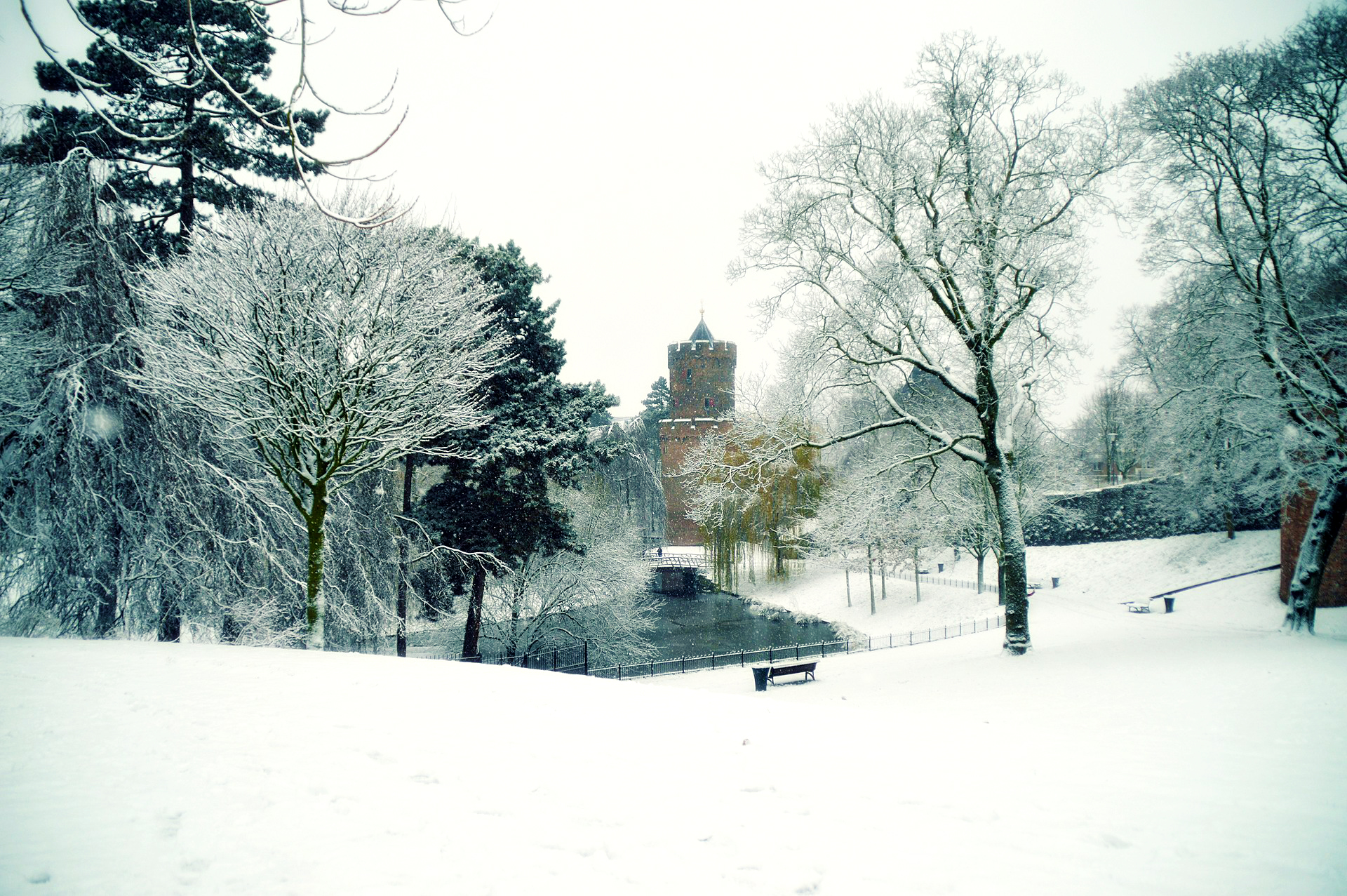
Kronenburgerpark in winter

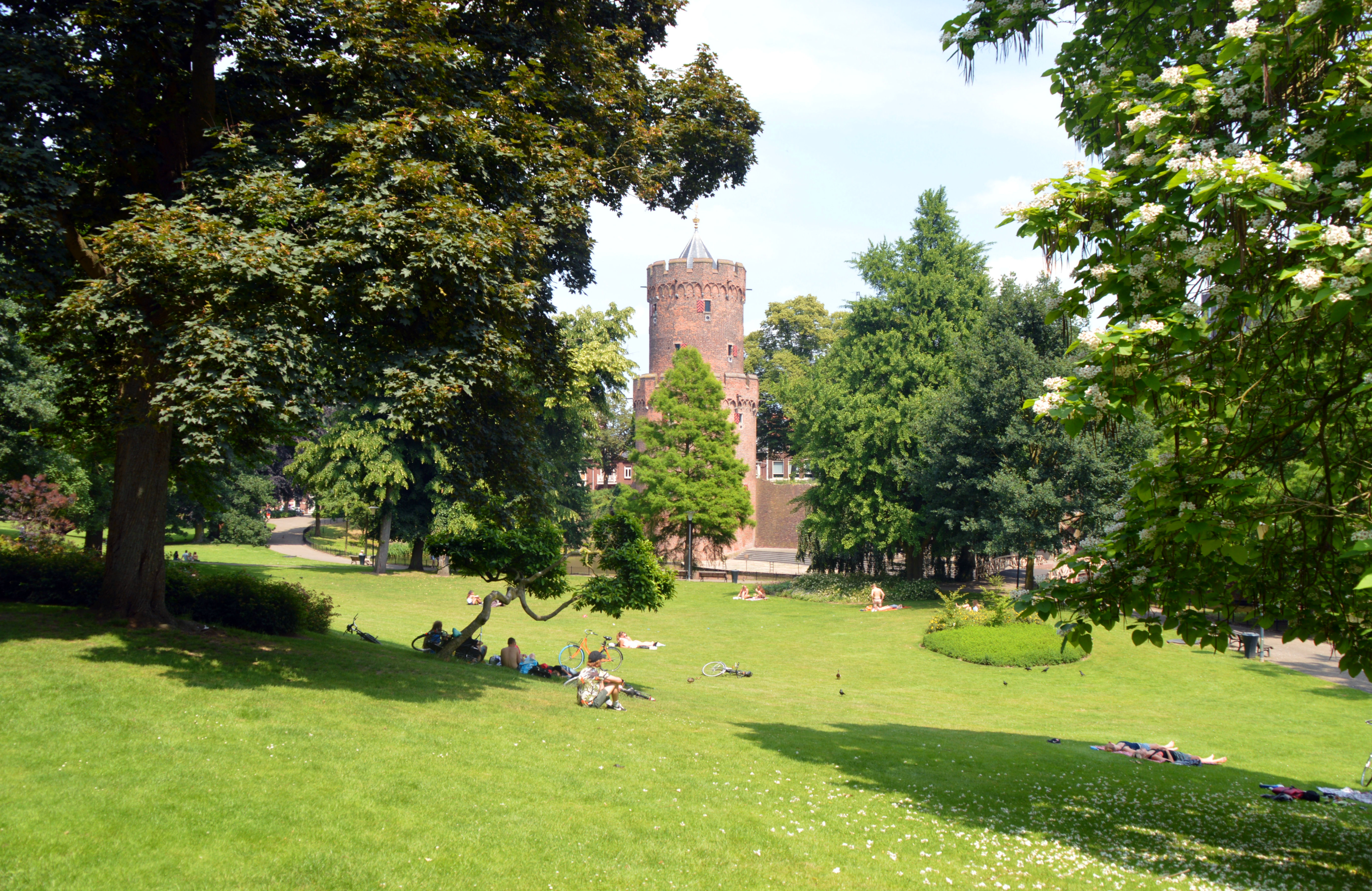
Kronenburgerpark in Kruittoren

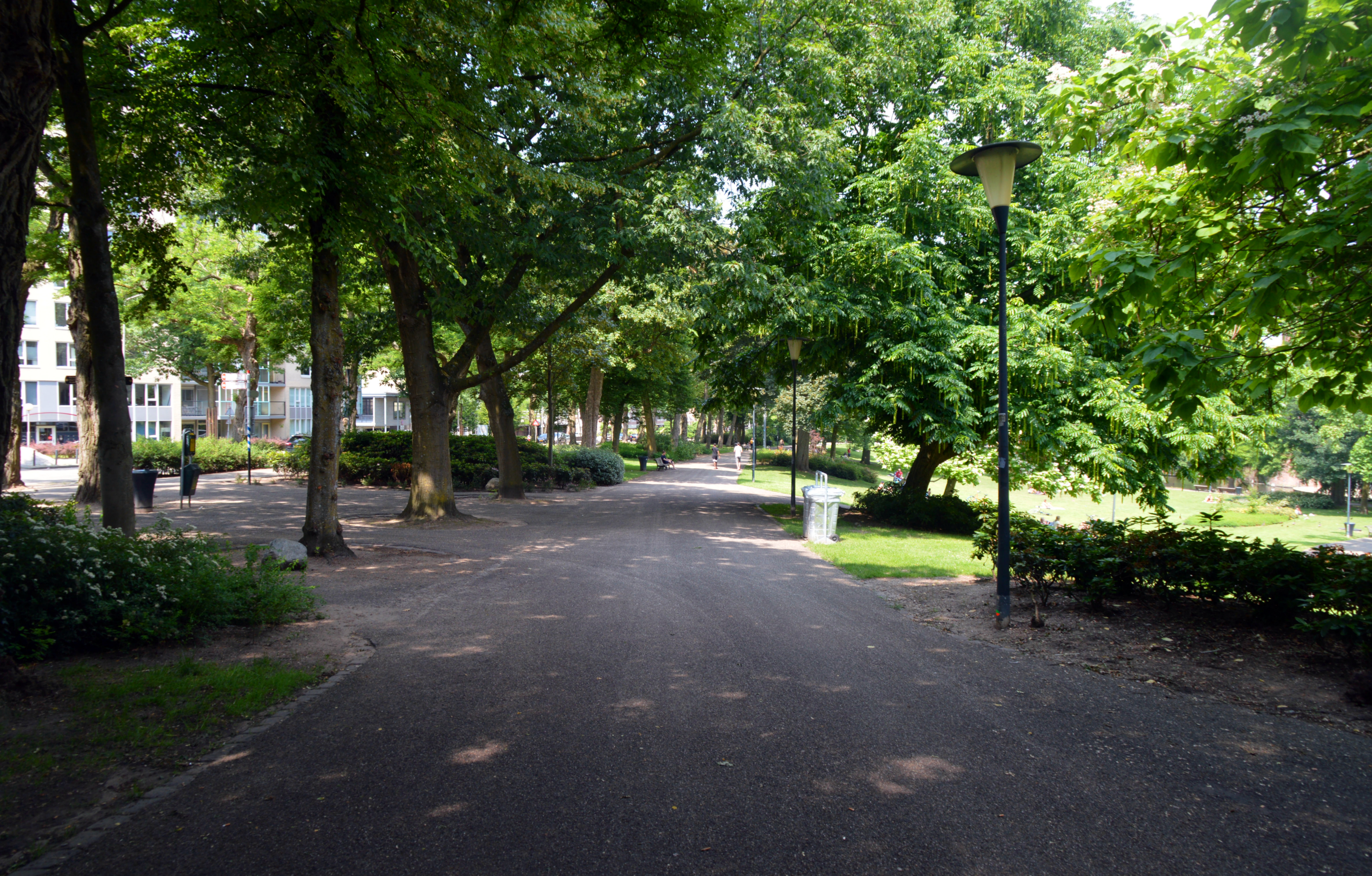
Park entrance

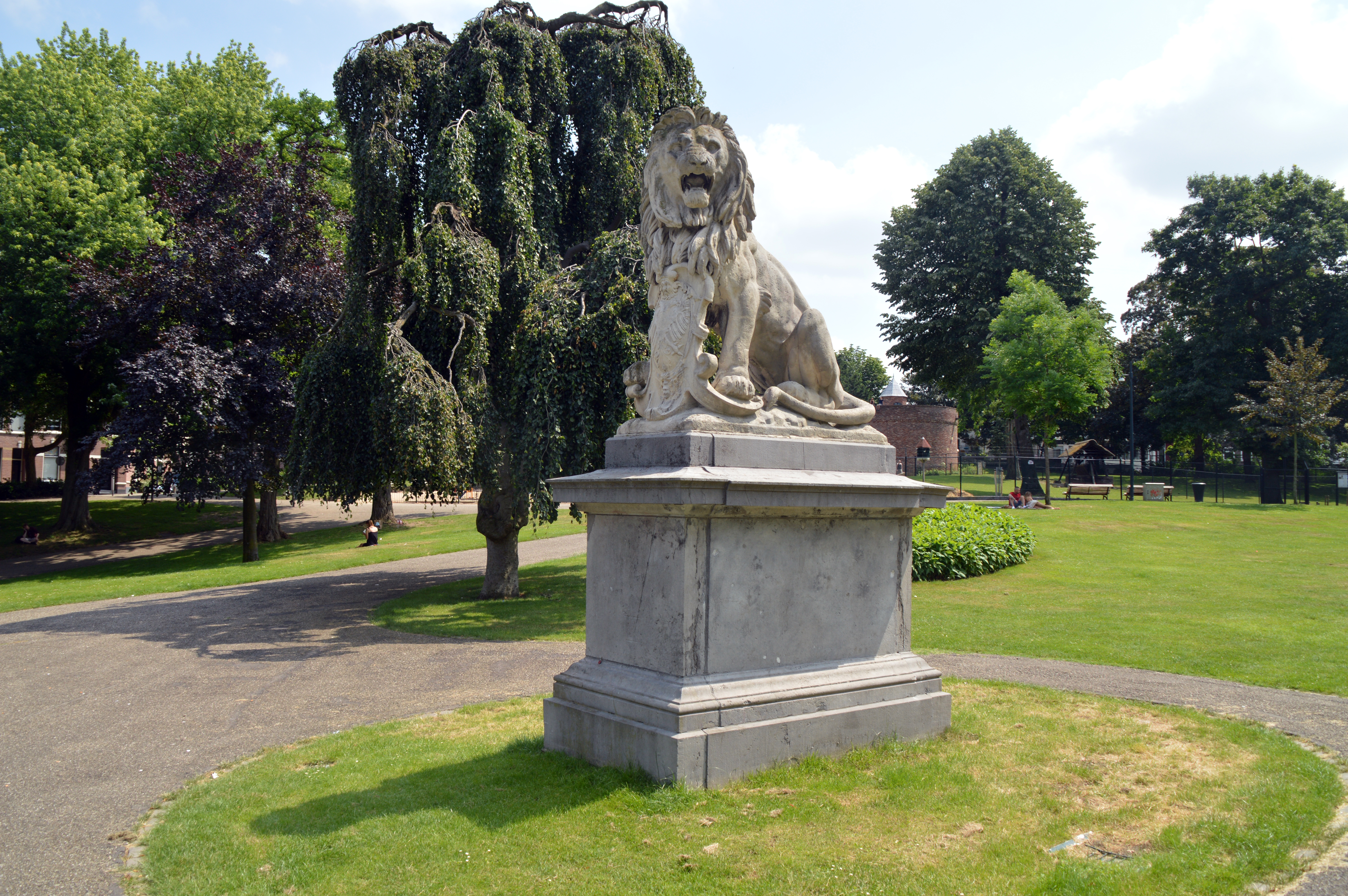
Park sculpture by Henri Leeuw sr.

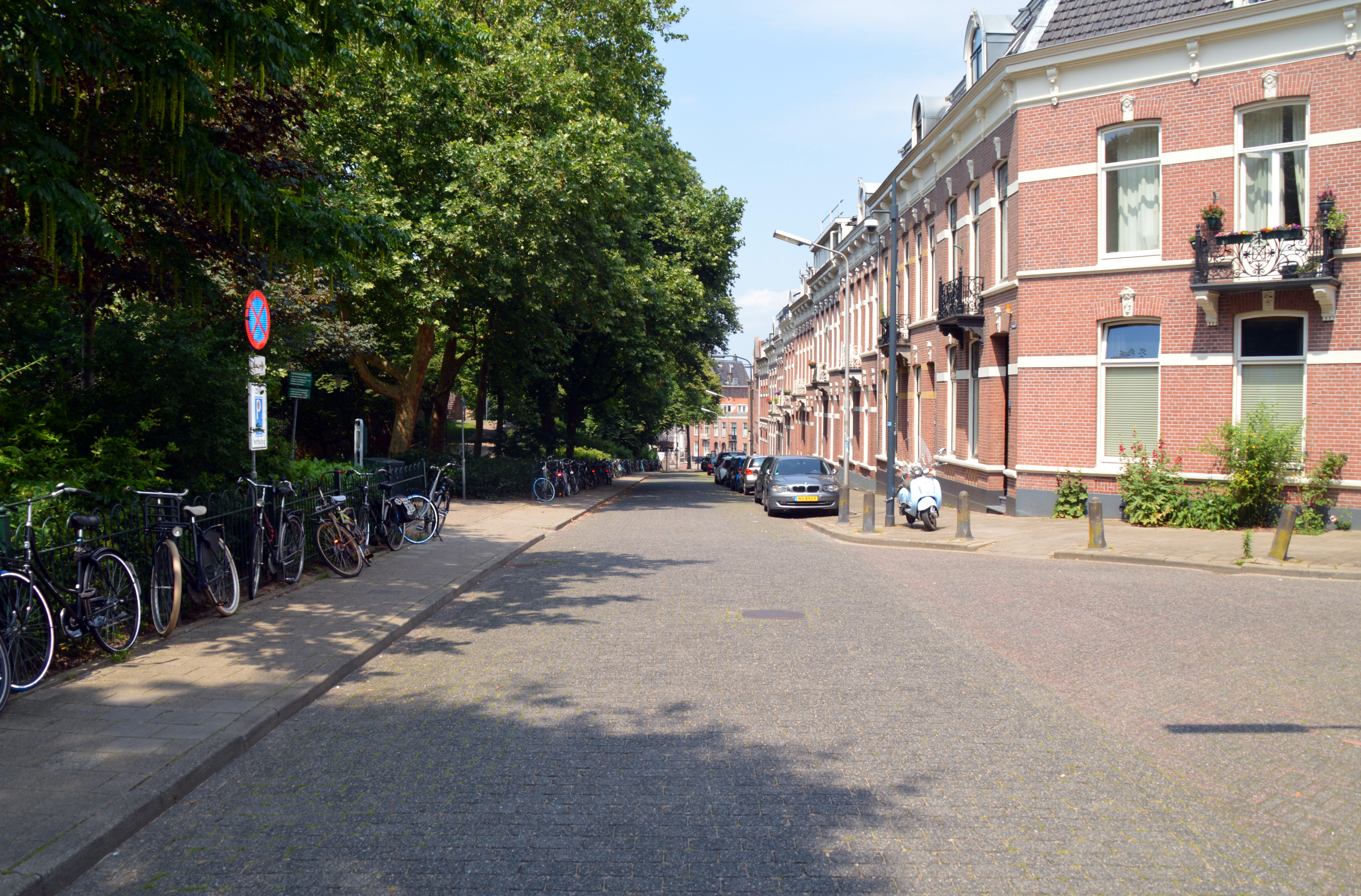
Entrance

== See also ==
- Battle of Nijmegen
