= Kerwin Duinmeijer =

Dutch murder victim (1968 – 1983)

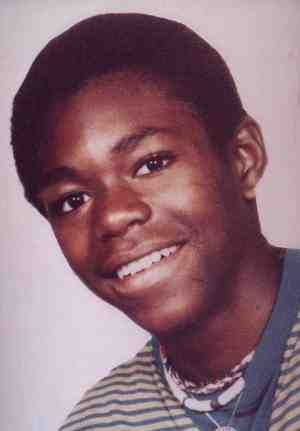
Kerwin Duinmeijer

Kerwin Lucas Duinmeijer (born Kerwin Lucas, though he later took on the surname of his foster parents; 5 June 1968 – 21 August 1983) was a Dutch teenager of Netherlands Antillean descent who was murdered in an act of senseless violence. Though still a point of contention, it has generally been accepted in the past, that racism played a major role in his murder.

== Death ==
Duinmeijer, 15 years old, was stabbed outside a snackbar in the Damstraat, Amsterdam by 16-year-old Nico Bodemeijer, a Dutch skinhead. After being stabbed, Duinmeijer ran to the Dam Square where he tried to take a taxi. The taxi drivers told Duinmeijer to wait for an ambulance, because they are legally not allowed to transport seriously injured passengers (though that was not mentioned in the media around that time, who wrote instead that the cab driver didn't want blood on his seats). A photographer from Panorama took photos of the dying boy lying on the Dam Square surrounded by onlookers. The ambulance arrived 20 minutes later and Duinmeijer was taken to the hospital. Duinmeijer died from his injuries shortly after the ambulance arrived at the hospital.

Bodemeijer was convicted of the murder, but according to the judge there was not enough evidence to define and see it as an act of racism. Bodemeijer was involuntarily committed in an institution for minors. He was released in 1988 but was jailed once more for another, non-lethal, stabbing, in a bar in 1990. In 1998 he threw a plant pot from an upstairs balcony towards a parking warden placing a wheel clamp on his car, narrowly missing him. This generated some new publicity. According to a Dutch television station, Bodemeijer committed suicide in January 2012.

== Legacy ==
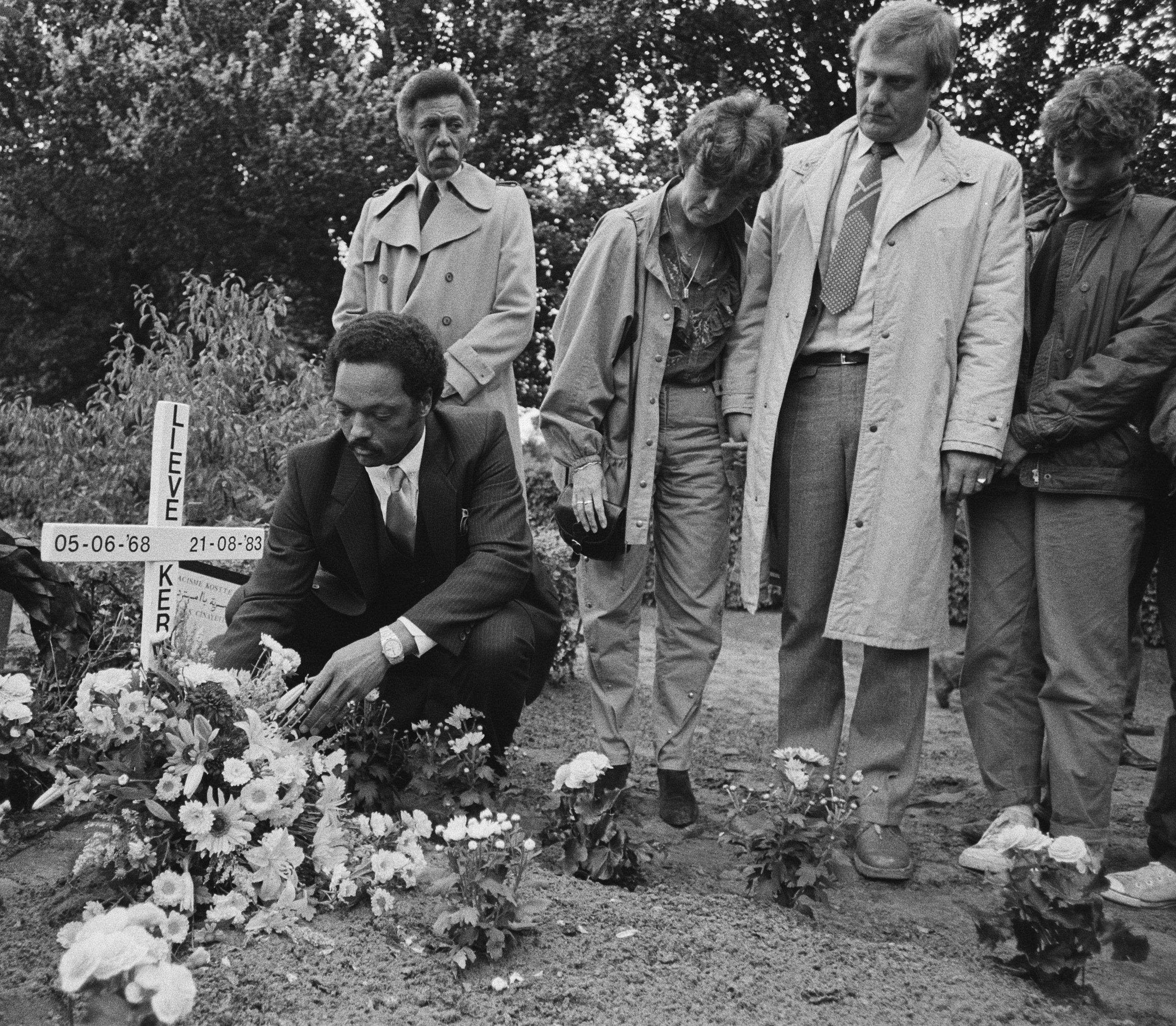
The Reverend Jesse Jackson visiting the grave with behind him the foster family of Duinmeijer, 13 September 1983.

Duinmeijer was buried at Zorgvlied cemetery. A memorial is held every year on the 20th of August in the Vondelpark, where the statue of Mama Baranka (Mother Earth [Rock]) by the Dutch-Antillean sculptor Nelson Carrilho was raised in Duinmeijer's memory. In 2018 at the place where he was killed.

A street in Diemen was named in honor of Duinmeijer. This street was later renamed Kerwin Lucasstraat.

The song Zwart Wit (Black White) by the Frank Boeijen Groep was inspired by the murder of Kerwin Duinmeijer.

A documentary film by Froukje Bos based on the murder, Kerwin, Sign of the Times (Kerwin, teken van de tijd), was broadcast by NOS-TV and European Broadcasting Union in 1984, receiving the Grand Prix d'Anube and press-award at the International film festival Bratislava 1985 as well as the J.B. Broeksz award 1985 (VARA).
