= Frank Boeijen =

Dutch singer and guitarist

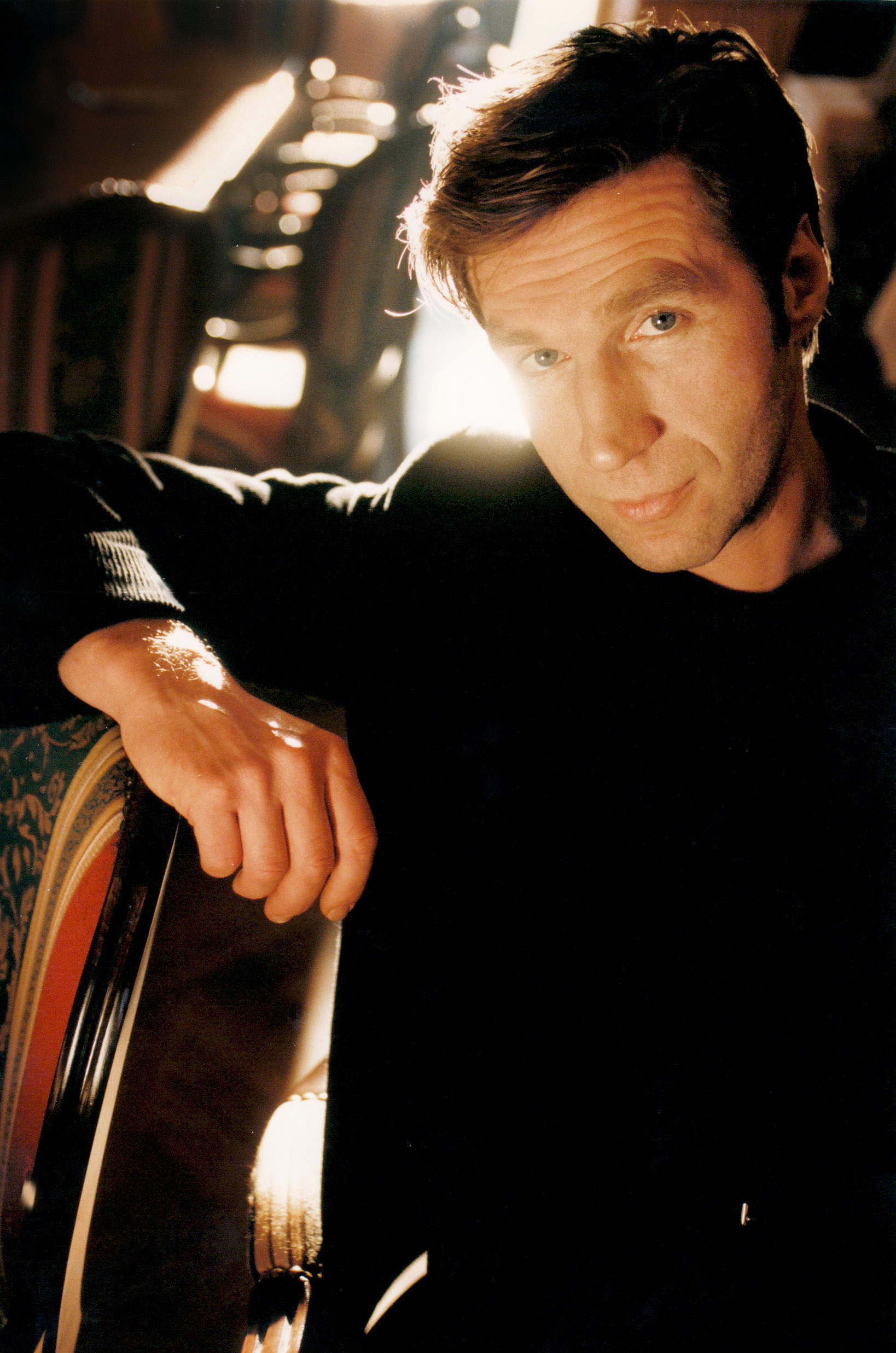
- Boeijen, c. 2002
- Born: Franciscus Johannes Maria Boeijen; 27 November 1957 (age 68); Nijmegen, Netherlands
- Website: http://www.frankboeijen.nl/

Franciscus Johannes Maria (Frank) Boeijen (born 27 November 1957 in Nijmegen) is a Dutch singer and guitarist. His best known songs are "Kronenburg Park (Ga die Wereld Uit)", about a sex worker; "Zwart Wit", about the racist murder of Kerwin Duinmeijer in Amsterdam; and "Twee gezichten", about someone with a split personality. Having been in the music business for 25 years, he received the Edison award for his contributions to Dutch music in 2005.

== Biography ==
=== Frank Boeijen Groep ===
Boeijen grew up in a family of ten children; his older brothers introduced him to Bob Dylan and Neil Young.

In 1979 Boeijen released his first album, a joint effort with Wout Pennings produced by singer Rob de Nijs; Henk Wanders (drums) and Nels Busch (bass) were recruited as backing musicians. Pennings left due to artistic differences; Will Theunissen (guitar) replaced him, and in November 1979 Frank Boeijen Groep played their first gig.

In 1981 FBG released their self-titled debut album to critical acclaim; OOR magazine was impressed by Boeijen's Herman van Veen-type voice. Leading single Transport uit Bangkok was about a sex worker from Thailand whose name translates as Goldflower (Dutch: "Gouden Bloem"). B-side Verjaardagsfeest, about how birthday parties can sometimes be boring, received more airplay.

In 1982 the band released the aptly-titled second album Twee, with keyboard-player Jos Haagmans joining the line-up.

The breakthrough came in 1983 with the album 1001 Hotel, featuring the Motown-inspired singles Het antwoord en Linda; the latter reached top 10. 1984 began with the release of Zwart Wit. Originally intended to chronicle a white Romeo/black Juliet relationship, it became a statement against the racist murder of Kerwin Duinmeijer.

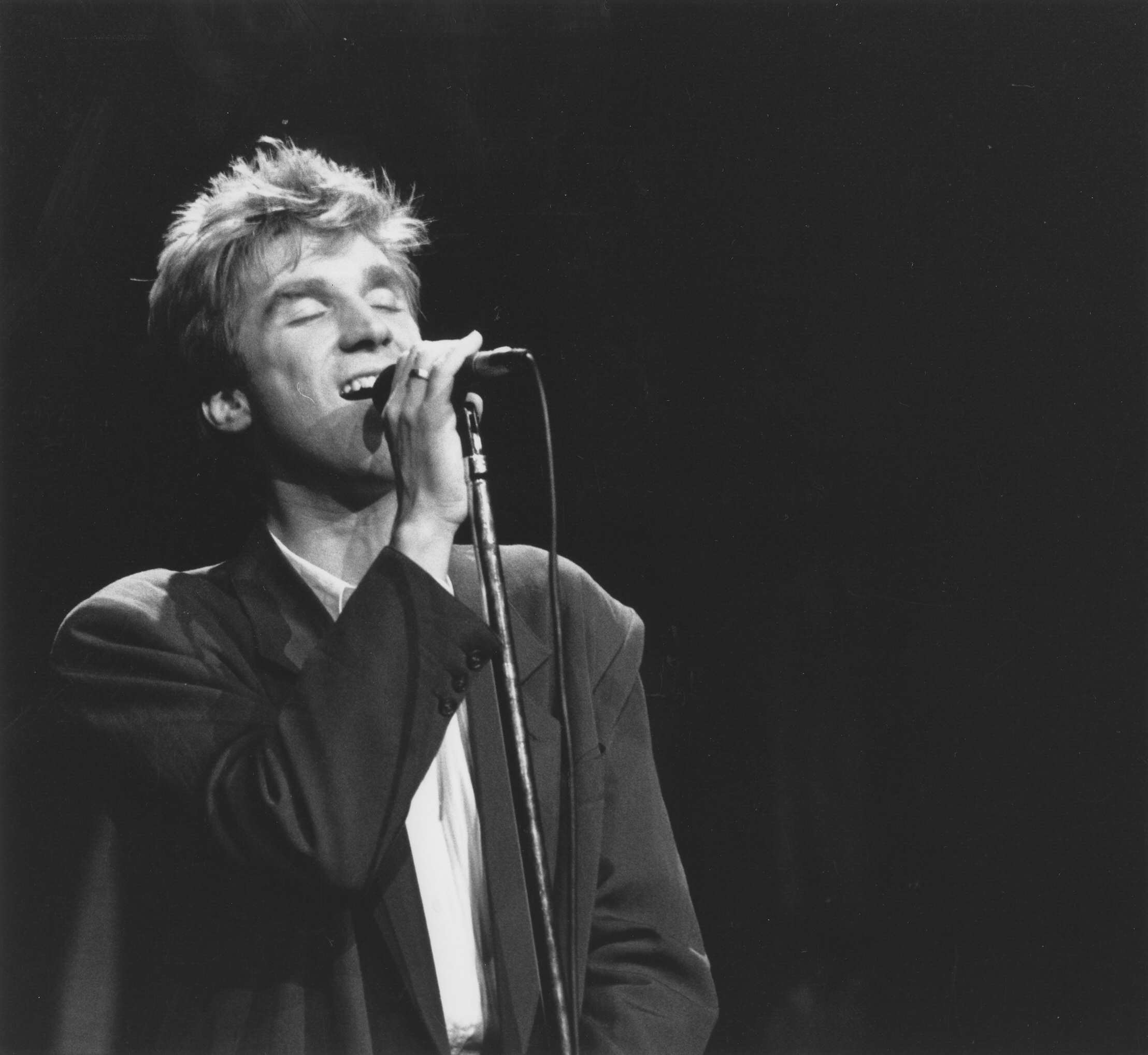
Boeijen performing in 1988

Theunissen left afterwards and was replaced by Maarten Peters for 1985's Foto van een mooie dag. Second single was Kronenburg Park on which Boeijen revisited the prostitute subject; R&B girl group Mai Tai supplied backing vocals and released their own version twenty years later. Kronenburg Park (inspired by the Kronenburgerpark) was also released in English as Round Midnight with lyrics by Golden Earring frontman Barry Hay ("You've always been the mistress of bad luck, making love for another lousy buck").

In 1986 FBG released In Natura, the first in a trilogy of In albums. Joined by new guitarist Ger Hoeijmakers, FBG went back to basics by using less synthesizers and adding the occasional sax and percussion to the mix. They also traded clubs for theatres, which was unusual at the time. The trilogy was completed by Welkom in Utopia and Dans In Slow Motion.

1990 began with the chart success of Zeg Me Dat Het Niet Zo Is, a ballad about (not) coping with the loss of a beloved one. The same year FBG celebrated their 10th anniversary by releasing Hier komt de storm, a live retrospective with the added bonus of new studio tracks. including the Bob Dylan tribute Robert Zimmerman. A major tour followed, which lasted till March 30, 1991. FBG disbanded afterwards, as Boeijen felt that the group had reached the end of its potential.

=== Solo career ===
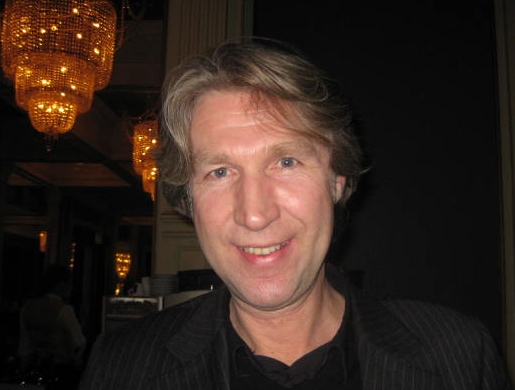
Boeijen in 2009

Boeijen became a solo artist; he continued to work with Hoeijmakers and recruited drummer Norman Bonink (now playing for BLØF), among others. He staged successful tours in both the Netherlands and Belgium. His 26th album was released in 2017.

=== Personal life ===
Frank Boeijen was married to Amanda Redington between 1990 and 1994.
