= Operation Berlin (Arnhem) =

1944 evacuation from Oosterbeek

- Part of the Battle of Arnhem; Operation Market Garden
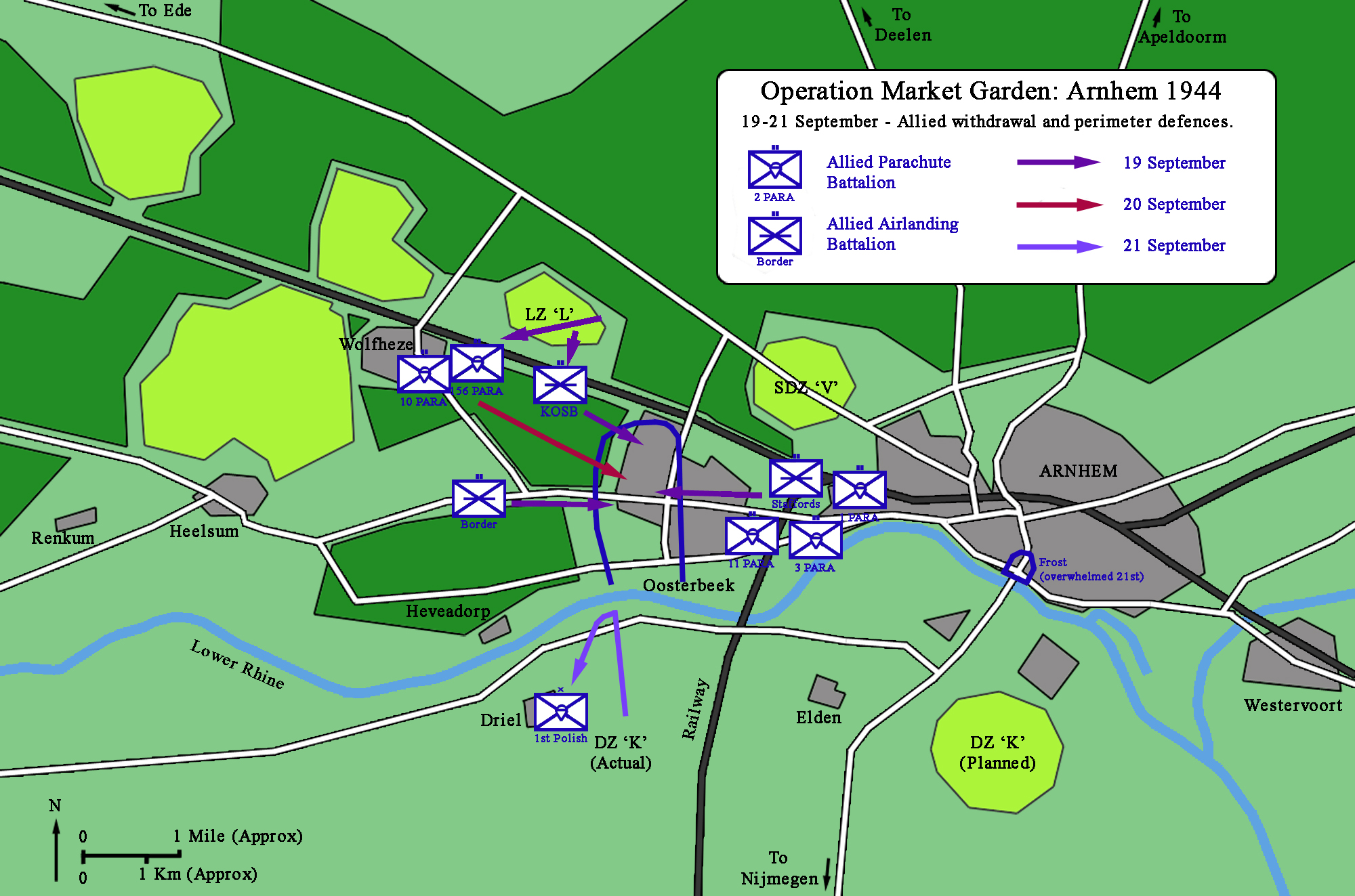
- Situation map showing the Oosterbeeek perimeter
- Type: Withdrawal
- Location: The Lower Rhine at Oosterbeek, the Netherlands; 51°59′5″N 5°50′40″E
- Planned: 25 September 1944
- Planned by: Major General Roy Urquhart
- Objective: Withdrawal of the 1st Airborne Division
- Date: Night of 25/26 September 1944; 22:00 – 05:00
- Executed by: 1st Polish Parachute Brigade; 43rd (Wessex) Infantry Division; 260th and 553rd Field Companies, RE, 43rd Wessex Division; 20th and 23rd Field Companies RCE, II Canadian Corps
- Outcome: c. 2,400 men evacuated
- Casualties: c. 95 killed

Operation Berlin (25/26 September 1944) was a night-time evacuation of the remnants of the beleaguered British 1st Airborne Division, in German-occupied territory north of the Lower Rhine in the Netherlands during Operation Market Garden in the Second World War. The aim of the operation was to withdraw the remnants of the division while covered by the 1st Polish Parachute Brigade and surrounded on three sides by more German troops with more heavy equipment and tanks and being in danger of encirclement.

The operation evacuated about 2,400 men of the British 1st Airborne Division, thus ending Market Garden, the Allied plan to cross the Rhine and close the European Theatre of World War II by the end of 1944. Members of the Glider Pilot Regiment laid white tape through the woods, leading from the perimeter, the grounds of the Hartenstein Hotel, to the north bank of the Neder-Rijn (Lower Rhine) where the Royal Canadian Engineers and Royal Engineers were waiting with small boats to ferry the men across the Rhine to a landing point north of Driel.

== Background ==
=== Operation Market Garden ===
In September 1944 the Allies launched Operation Market Garden, an attempt to bypassing the northern end of the Siegfried Line and advance into the Ruhr, Germany's industrial heartland. The goal of Market Garden was to end the war around Christmas 1944 by capturing the Ruhr, thus crippling German war economy. The British 1st Airborne Division and the American 82nd Airborne Division and 101st Airborne Division were to seize and hold several bridges in the Netherlands through which XXX Corps (General Brian Horrocks) could advance into Germany.

At the end of this 30 mi (48 km) 'airborne corridor' was Arnhem on the lower Rhine. By holding that bridge, the Allied forces could turn south and push into the Ruhr valley. Of the troops dropped into Arnhem, approximately 40 per cent were members of the Parachute Regiment, later supported by members of the Polish 1st Independent Parachute Brigade. The remainder of the division comprised battalions transported by the Glider Pilot Regiment. They expected to be relieved by XXX Corps within two days.

The landings and parachute drops began on 17 September 1944 and lasted three days. German resistance was much more effective than anticipated. The II SS Panzer Corps had been sent to this part of the Netherlands to refit after Normandy. Only a small force led by Major John Frost were able to reach Arnhem bridge. The British paratroopers managed to take one end but were outnumbered and outgunned and were defeated after four days of intense fighting. The rest of the 1st Airborne division established a defensive perimeter around the Hartenstein Hotel in Oosterbeek (a suburb west of Arnhem), known since as the Oosterbeek Perimeter.

The British forces' hope was that when XXX Corps did arrive, they would be able to cross the river and establish a bridgehead. Four days after the start of the operation, the 1st Polish Parachute Brigade landed at Driel south of the Rhine on 21 September. Without equipment to cross the river, they were unable to assist the British. Although the Allies managed to win the Battle of Nijmegen (17–21 September) and move XXX Corps across the river Waal that day, the troops were exhausted after five days of fighting and did not advance further until the next day. The spearhead of XXX Corps reached the Poles on 22 September.

=== Relief attempts ===
Major General Roy Urquhart, commander of the 1st Airborne Division, originally requested the 1st Polish Brigade to cross the river and take up their positions on the night of 21 September. Neither unit had any boats and the Poles withdrew to Driel for the night, setting up a hedgehog defence. Elements of XXX Corps reached Driel the following day but at the same time the Germans formed a blocking line to the west to prevent an Allied advance on the road bridge. During the day the 1st Airborne Division found six rubber boats and again assisted the Polish attempt to cross. That night the plan was put into operation but the tow rope to pull the boats across snapped and the oars were too small to row against the river's strong current. 55 men crossed but only 35 were able to reach the British positions.

On 23 September, the 43rd (Wessex) Division (Major General Ivor Thomas) arrived at Driel in strength and offered assault boats for the Poles. Unfortunately, these arrived late and the Poles, unfamiliar with the craft, were able to put only 153 men across the river – less than a quarter of the hoped for reinforcement. On 24 September, Horrocks visited the Polish positions to assess the situation. That afternoon a conference was held at Valburg to discuss how best to relieve what was left of the 1st Airborne Division. Thomas outlined a plan to put across a battalion of his division and one of the Polish battalions – to the fury of their commander Major General Stanisław Sosabowski. Despite this it seems that Horrocks realised that the position of the 1st Airborne Division was untenable and plans were drawn up for its withdrawal. That night's attempt to cross the river was a disaster. Insufficient boats arrived for both battalions and only the 4th Battalion of the Dorsetshire Regiment made the attempt. Unfortunately, their crossing arrived on prepared German positions and of the 315 men who crossed before daylight, over 200 were captured. Two men who did reach the Airborne forces carried copies of the withdrawal plan for Urquhart's consideration.

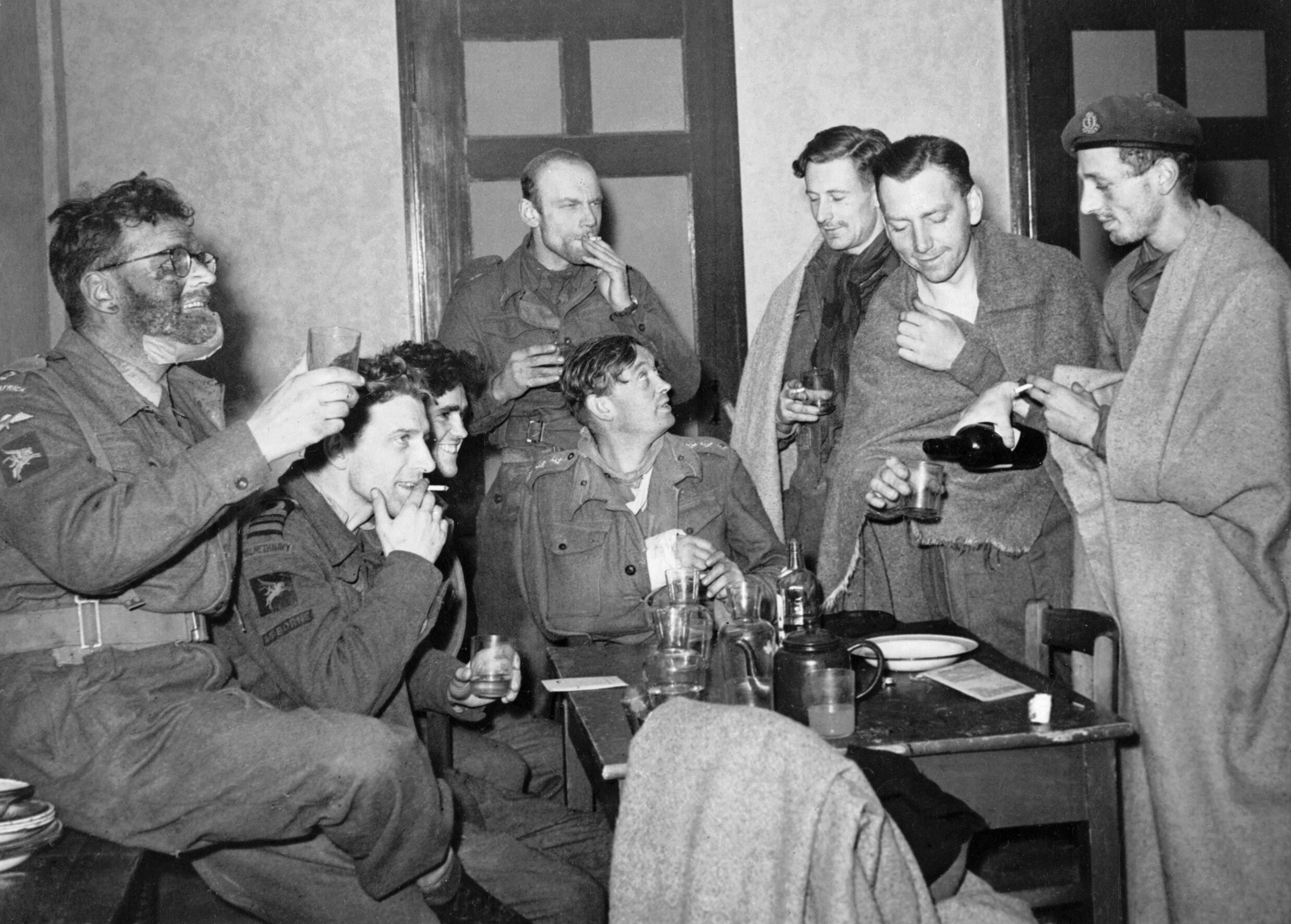
A group of surviving Allied soldiers from Arnhem arriving at Nijmegen after the evacuation

The reinforcement attempts met with only minimal success. The next step was to evacuate the remnants of the 1st Airborne Division using small boats across the Neder Rijn at night. Four sapper field companies were allotted for Operation Berlin, the 260th and 553rd Field Companies RE and the 20th and 23rd Field Companies RCE. The operation was to start at 22:00 on 25 September but the field companies had left many hours earlier and moved through German positions to the south bank of the Neder Rijn. In dismal weather and under constant German machine gun, mortar, and artillery fire, the boats shuttled back and forth across the wide, swift-flowing river through the night. The evacuation went on until daylight, when the operation was forced to cease.

== Aftermath ==
Of the original 10,095 men landed by parachute and glider at Arnhem, 2,500 were fit to fight on the night of 25 September. Of these, 2,163 British, among them, 75 men of the 4th Dorsets, along with 160 Poles, made it across the Rhine and into the safety of the Driel perimeter. Operation Berlin rescued some 2,500 airborne troops with the 23rd Field Company RE recovering the majority of the paratroopers with about 150 boatloads. The 23rd Field Company lost seven men killed and 14 wounded while five were decorated for their actions.

== Monument ==
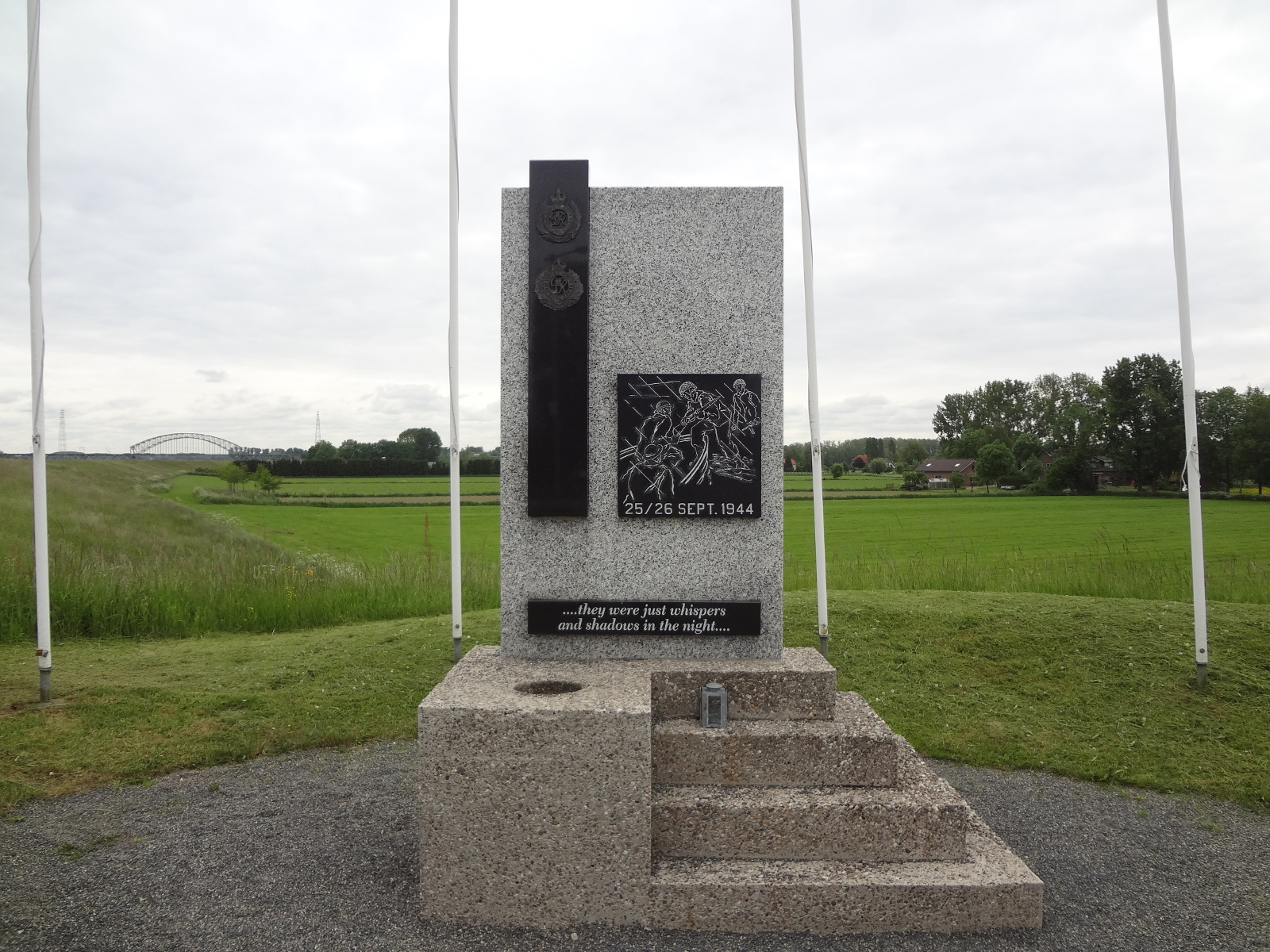
Memorial on the southern bank of the Rhine River, near Arnhem

On the south bank of the Rhine there is a monument commemorating the role of the Canadian and British engineers who participated in Operation Berlin. The text on the monument is

It is 25th September 1944: The battle of Arnhem is still raging, but the position of the surrounded British and Polish troops on the northern Rhine bank has become untenable. Then the order for their evacuation across the river is given. In that rainy night hundreds of soldiers come in small parties to the river forelands, between the farmhouse and the Old Church – both clearly visible from here – and wait to be rescued. Under heavy German fire from the Westerbouwing, British (260 and 553 Fd Coys) and Canadian (20 and 23 Fd Coys) Engineers make dozens of trips in their small boats from this bank. In one night, supported by other units, they manage to rescue 2,400 airborne troops. At the time the rescued had hardly seen their savers, so they have never been able to thank them. This monument has been erected to express their gratitude (15 September 1989).

== Footnotes ==
=== Bibliography ===
- Badsey, Stephen (1993). Arnhem 1944, Operation Market Garden. Osprey. ISBN 1-85532-302-8.
- Kerry, A. J. (1966). The History of the Corps of Royal Canadian Engineers 1936–1946. Vol. II. Ottawa: Military Engineers Association of Canada. OCLC 1047889626.
- Kershaw, Robert (1990). It Never Snows In September. Ian Allan. ISBN 0-7110-2167-8.
- Middlebrook, Martin (1994). Arnhem 1944: The Airborne Battle. Viking. ISBN 0-670-83546-3.
- Ryan, Cornelius (1999) [1974]. A Bridge Too Far. Wordsworth Editions. ISBN 1-84022-213-1.
- Waddy, John (1999). A Tour of the Arnhem Battlefields. Pen & Sword Books. ISBN 0-85052-571-3.
