= Hanneke =

Dutch feminine given name

- Pronunciation: Dutch: [ˈɦɑnəkə]
- Gender: Feminine
- Language: Dutch

Other names
- Derived: Johannes

Hanneke (Dutch pronunciation: [ˈɦɑnəkə]) is a Dutch feminine given name. It is a diminutive, indicated by the suffix -ke, derived from the name Johannes. Its popularity peaked in 1980.

== People named Hanneke ==
People with the given name Hanneke include:

- Hanneke Beaumont (born 1947), Dutch-born sculptor
- Hanneke Boerma (born 1975), Dutch diplomat and politician
- Hanneke Canters (1969–2002), Dutch feminist philosopher and academic
- Hanneke Cassel (born 1978), American folk musician
- Hanneke Groenteman (born 1939), Dutch journalist
- Hanneke Hoefnagel (born 1988), Dutch gymnast
- Hanneke Ippisch (1925–2012), Dutch WWII resistance member
- Hanneke Jagersma (born 1951), Dutch politician
- Hanneke Jansen, Dutch chemist
- Hanneke Kappen (born 1954), a Dutch singer and presenter
- Hanneke Ketelaars (born 1974), Dutch tennis player
- Hanneke Mensink (born 1977), Dutch football player
- Hanneke Niens (born 1965), Dutch producer
- Hanneke van Parreren (born 1953), Dutch chess player
- Hanneke Schuitemaker, Dutch virologist
- Hanneke Smabers (born 1973), Dutch field hockey player
- Hanneke van der Werf (born 1984), Dutch politician
