= List of bridges in the Netherlands =

This list of bridges in the Netherlands lists bridges of particular historical, scenic, architectural or engineering interest in the Netherlands. Road and railway bridges, viaducts, aqueducts and footbridges are included.

== Historical and architectural interest bridges ==
	Name	Distinction	Length	Type	Carries Crosses	Opened	Location	Province	Ref.
1	Magere Brug	Rijksmonument	80 m (260 ft)	Beam bridge Drawbridge	Footbridge; Amstel	1670	Amsterdam; 52°21′48.9″N 4°54′8.5″E	North Holland	
2	Python Bridge			Truss; Steel	Footbridge; IJ	2000	Amsterdam; 52°22′22.8″N 4°56′56″E	North Holland	
3	Slauerhoffbrug		15 m (49 ft)	Beam bridge Steel; Tilt bridge	Road bridge Harlingervaart	2000	Leeuwarden; 53°11′55.1″N 5°45′57.1″E	Friesland	
4	Enneüs Heerma Bridge		205 m (673 ft)	Arch; Steel tied arch Bow-string bridge	S114; IJtram; IJ	2001	Amsterdam; 52°21′54.2″N 4°58′36.2″E	North Holland	
5	De Luit Bridge	Designed by Santiago Calatrava		Cable-stayed; Steel deck, steel inclined pylon	Road bridge Hoofdvaart	2004	Haarlemmermeer; 52°17′25.9″N 4°40′17.1″E	North Holland	
6	De Harp Bridge	Designed by Santiago Calatrava	143 m (469 ft)	Cable-stayed; Steel deck, steel inclined pylon	Road bridge Hoofdvaart	2004	Haarlemmermeer; 52°16′22″N 4°38′44.5″E	North Holland	
7	De Citer Bridge	Designed by Santiago Calatrava	149 m (489 ft)	Cable-stayed; Steel deck, steel inclined pylon	Road bridge Hoofdvaart	2004	Haarlemmermeer; 52°17′2.7″N 4°39′41.3″E	North Holland	
8	Nesciobrug	Span : 170 m (560 ft)		Suspension; Steel box girder deck, steel pylons	Footbridge; Amsterdam–Rhine Canal	2006	Diemen; 52°21′23.4″N 4°58′10.1″E	North Holland	
9	Rode brug		10 m (33 ft)	Beam bridge Steel; Drawbridge	Road bridge Vecht	2009	Utrecht; 52°6′23.1″N 5°6′26.2″E	Utrecht	

== Major road and railway bridges ==
	Name	Span	Length	Type	Carries Crosses	Opened	Location	Province	Ref.
1	Van Brienenoord Bridge	287 m (942 ft)	1,306 m (4,285 ft)	Arch; Steel tied arch Bow-string bridge	A16 motorway European route E19; Nieuwe Maas	1965	Rotterdam; 51°54′12″N 4°32′35.7″E	South Holland	
2	De Oversteek	285 m (935 ft)	1,400 m (4,600 ft)	Arch; Steel tied arch Bow-string bridge	Stadsroute 100; Waal	2013	Nijmegen; 51°51′29.8″N 5°50′28.8″E	Gelderland	
3	Erasmusbrug	278 m (912 ft)	802 m (2,631 ft)	Cable-stayed; Steel deck, steel pylon	Stadsroute 106; Stadsroute 122; Rotterdam Tramway (lines 12, 20, 23, 25); Nieuwe Maas	1996	Rotterdam; 51°54′32.2″N 4°29′14.1″E	South Holland	
4	Tacitusbrug	270 m (890 ft)	1,055 m (3,461 ft)	Cable-stayed; East: steel deck and pylons, axial cable-stays West: concrete deck and pylons 105+270+105	A50 motorway European route E31; Waal	1975; 2013	Beuningen; 51°53′7.5″N 5°44′16.6″E	Gelderland	
5	Willemsbrug	270 m (890 ft)	318 m (1,043 ft)	Cable-stayed; Steel deck, steel pylons	Stadsroute 123; Nieuwe Maas	1981	Rotterdam; 51°55′1.4″N 4°29′45.2″E	South Holland	
6	Prince Willem-Alexander Bridge	267 m (876 ft)	1,419 m (4,656 ft)	Cable-stayed; Concrete deck, pylons and cable-stays 95+267+95	Provincial road 323; Waal	1972	Echteld; 51°53′20.3″N 5°29′51″E	Gelderland	
7	Martinus Nijhoff Bridge	256 m (840 ft)	990 m (3,250 ft)	Cable-stayed; Concrete deck and pylons	A2 motorway European route E25; Waal	1996	Zaltbommel; 51°49′5.3″N 5°15′36.3″E	Gelderland	
8	Zandhazen Bridge	255 m (837 ft)	255 m (837 ft)	Arch; Steel tied arch Bow-string bridge	Weesp–Lelystad railway A1 motorway	2016	Muiderberg; 52°19′00.6″N 5°05′56.8″E	North Holland	
9	Waalbrug	244 m (801 ft)	604 m (1,982 ft)	Arch; Steel through arch	Provincial road 325; Waal	1936	Nijmegen; 51°51′4.6″N 5°52′16.5″E	Gelderland	
10	Werkspoor Bridge (Amsterdam–Rhine Canal)	237 m (778 ft)	255 m (837 ft)	Arch; Steel tied arch Bow-string bridge	Amsterdam–Arnhem railway Amsterdam–Rhine Canal	2002	Utrecht; 52°6′36.9″N 5°4′36.7″E	Utrecht	
11	Nijmegen railway bridge	235 m (771 ft)	375 m (1,230 ft)	Truss; Steel	Arnhem–Nijmegen railway Waal	1983	Nijmegen; 51°51′7.2″N 5°51′23.8″E	Gelderland	
12	Merwede Bridge (Beneden Merwede)	202 m (663 ft)	1,032 m (3,386 ft)	Arch; Steel tied arch Bow-string bridge	N3 motorway Beneden Merwede	1967	Papendrecht; 51°51′22.7″N 4°39′14.9″E	South Holland	
13	Molenbrug (Kampen)	193 m (633 ft)	627 m (2,057 ft)	Cable-stayed; Steel deck, steel pylons Twin bridges 91+193+91	Provincial road N764; Ijssel	1983	Kampen; 52°32′31.2″N 5°55′55.8″E	Overijssel	
14	Dintelhaven Bridge	192 m (630 ft)		Box girder Prestressed concrete Twin bridges 80+151+80	A15 motorway Dintelhaven	2001	Rotterdam; 51°56′9.5″N 4°8′30.5″E	South Holland	
15	Schalkwijkse Railway Bridge	188 m (617 ft)		Arch; Steel tied arch	Utrecht–Boxtel railway Amsterdam–Rhine Canal	1976	Schalkwijk; 52°0′21.8″N 5°11′6.5″E	Utrecht	
16	Muider Railway Bridge	188 m (617 ft)	251 m (823 ft)	Arch; Steel tied arch Bow-string bridge	Amsterdam–Zutphen railway Amsterdam–Rhine Canal	1995	Diemen–Weesp; 52°19′28.9″N 5°1′3″E	North Holland	
17	Galecopperbrug	180 m (590 ft)	320 m (1,050 ft)	Cable-stayed; Steel deck, steel pylons Twin bridges 70+180+70	A12 motorway European route E30; European route E35; Amsterdam–Rhine Canal	1974	Utrecht; 52°3′38.4″N 5°5′51.6″E	Utrecht	
18	Demka Railway Bridge	173 m (568 ft)	255 m (837 ft)	Arch; Steel tied arch	Amsterdam–Arnhem railway Amsterdam–Rhine Canal	1970	Utrecht; 52°06′37.7″N 5°04′37.4″E	Utrecht	
19	Vleutense Railway Bridge	172 m (564 ft)	172 m (564 ft)	Arch; Steel tied arch Bow-string bridge	Utrecht–Rotterdam railway Amsterdam–Rhine Canal	2018	Utrecht; 52°05′52.8″N 5°04′37.5″E	Utrecht	
20	Merwede Bridge (Boven Merwede)	170 m (560 ft)(x2)	340 m (1,120 ft)	Arch; Steel tied arch Bow-string bridge	A27 motorway European route E311; Boven Merwede	1961	Gorinchem–Sleeuwijk; 51°49′38.1″N 4°56′32.8″E	South Holland; North Brabant	
21	Dintelhaven Railway Bridge	170 m (560 ft)	270 m (890 ft)	Arch; Steel tied arch Bow-string bridge	Betuweroute; Dintelhaven	1999	Rotterdam; 51°56′10.5″N 4°8′26.6″E	South Holland	
22	Hogeweide Bridge	170 m (560 ft)	170 m (560 ft)	Arch; Steel tied arch Bow-string bridge	Road bridge Amsterdam–Rhine Canal	2007	Utrecht; 52°5′51.7″N 5°4′37.4″E	Utrecht	
23	Jan Blanken Bridge (Vianen)	165 m (541 ft)	532 m (1,745 ft)	Box girder Prestressed concrete Twin bridges	A2 motorway European route E25; Lek	1999; 2003	Nieuwegein–Vianen; 51°59′51.2″N 5°4′40.2″E	Utrecht	
24	Muider Bridge	162 m (531 ft)	300 m (980 ft)	Box girder Steel; Twin bridges	A1 motorway European route E231; Amsterdam–Rhine Canal	1972	Muiden; 52°19′56.7″N 5°00′53.4″E	North Holland	
25	Stichtse Bridge	160 m (520 ft)	325 m (1,066 ft)	Box girder Prestressed concrete Twin bridges	A27 motorway Gooimeer; Eemmeer	1997	Almere–Huizen; 52°18′13.1″N 5°18′52.3″E	Flevoland; North Holland	
26	Heumen Highway Bridge	157 m (515 ft)	658 m (2,159 ft)	Box girder Prestressed concrete Twin bridges	A73 motorway European route E31; Meuse	1981	Heumen–Linden; 52°22′41.5″N 4°57′59.6″E	Gelderland; North Brabant	
27	Old Kuilenburg Railway Bridge	154 m (505 ft)	667 m (2,188 ft)	Truss; Steel	Utrecht–Boxtel railway Lek	1867	Culemborg; 51°57′38″N 5°12′48.3″E	Gelderland	
28	Kuilenburg Railway Bridge	154 m (505 ft)	667 m (2,188 ft)	Arch; Steel tied arch Bow-string bridge	Utrecht–Boxtel railway Lek	1982	Culemborg; 51°57′38.1″N 5°12′48.7″E	Gelderland	
29	Vianen Bridge (1936) closed in 2004	153 m (502 ft)	532 m (1,745 ft)	Arch; Steel tied arch Bow-string bridge	Lek	1936	Nieuwegein–Vianen; 51°57′38.1″N 5°12′48.7″E	Utrecht	
30	Uyllander Bridge	152 m (499 ft)	362 m (1,188 ft)	Arch; Steel tied arch Bow-string bridge	Stadsroute 114; Amsterdam–Rhine Canal	2014	Diemen; 52°20′12.0″N 5°00′32.7″E	North Holland	
31	New Bridge over the IJssel (Zwolle)	150 m (490 ft)	644 m (2,113 ft)	Box girder Prestressed concrete	A28 motorway European route E232; Ijssel	1970	Zwolle–Hattem; 52°29′59.3″N 6°3′15.3″E	Overijssel; Gelderland	
32	Rooyensteinsebrug	150 m (490 ft)	308 m (1,010 ft)	Box girder Prestressed concrete	Provincial road 835; Amsterdam–Rhine Canal	1977	Tiel; 51°55′24.2″N 5°25′34.3″E	Gelderland	
33	Eiland Bridge (Overijssel)	150 m (490 ft)	412 m (1,352 ft)	Cable-stayed; Composite steel/concrete deck, concrete pylon	A50 motorway Ijssel	2003	Kampen; 52°34′59″N 5°51′32.7″E	Overijssel	
34	Prince Claus Bridge (Utrecht)	150 m (490 ft)	230 m (750 ft)	Cable-stayed; Composite steel/concrete deck, steel pylon	Road bridge Amsterdam–Rhine Canal	2003	Utrecht; 52°4′15.6″N 5°5′17.2″E	Utrecht	
35	Hanzeboog	150 m (490 ft)	926 m (3,038 ft)	Arch; Steel tied arch Bow-string bridge 75+150+75	Utrecht–Kampen railway Lelystad–Zwolle railway Road bridge Ijssel	2011	Zwolle–Hattem; 52°29′23.6″N 6°3′43.4″E	Overijssel; Gelderland	
36	Bleiswijk Railway Bridge		5,500 m (18,000 ft)	Box girder Prestressed concrete	HSL-Zuid	2004	Bleiswijk; 52°2′20.2″N 4°31′43.5″E	South Holland	
37	Zeeland Bridge	95 m (312 ft)	5,022 m (16,476 ft)	Box girder Prestressed concrete	Provincial road 256; Eastern Scheldt	1965	Schouwen-Duiveland–Noord-Beveland; 51°36′47.6″N 3°53′33.4″E	Zeeland	

== Notes and references ==
- "Netherlands bridge database". Bruggenstichting.nl - Nederlandse Bruggen Stichting (in Dutch).
- Nicolas Janberg. "International Database for Civil and Structural Engineering". Structurae.com.
- Others references

== See also ==
- Transport in the Netherlands
- Rail transport in the Netherlands
- List of motorways in the Netherlands
- Geography of the Netherlands
