= Julian Sas =

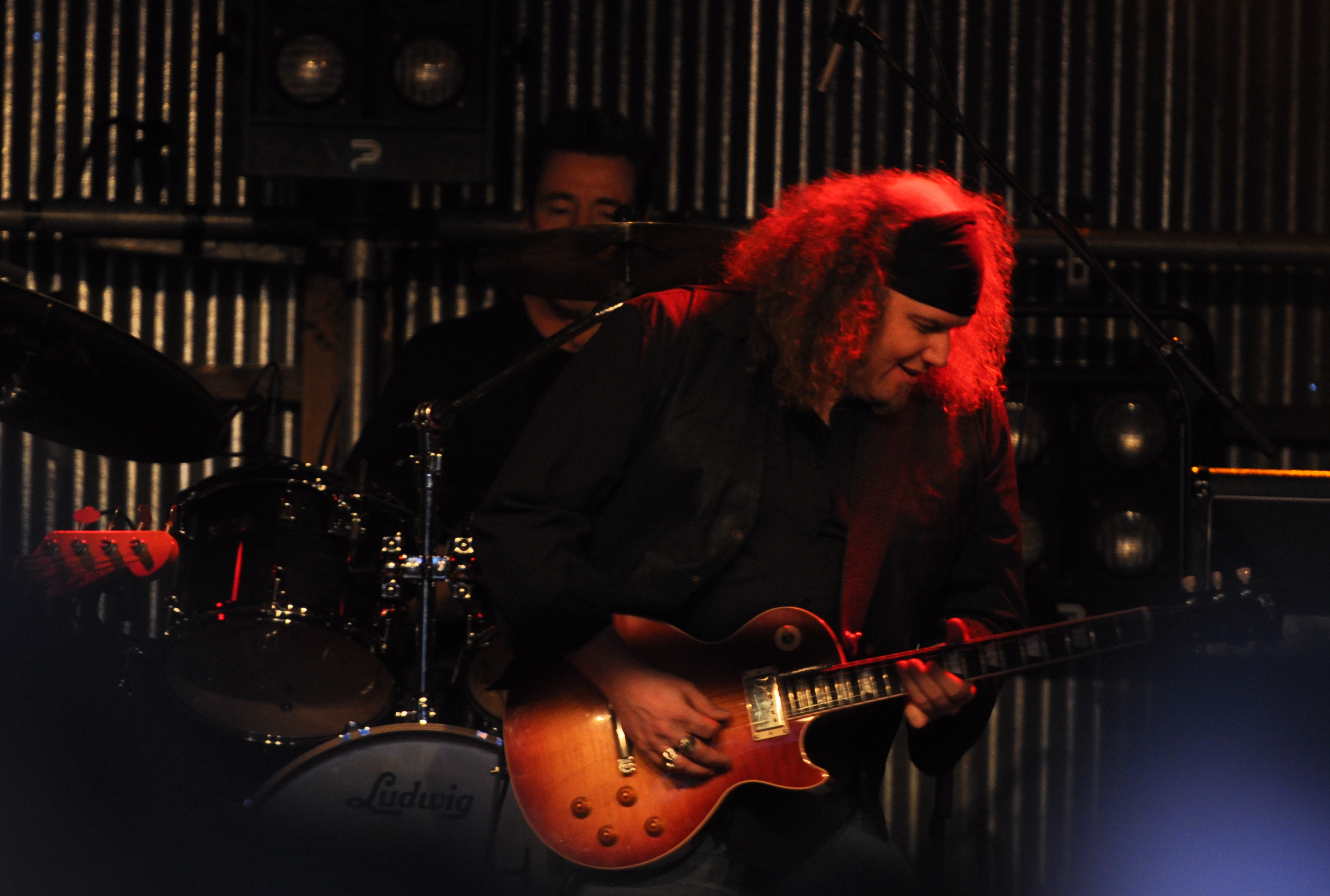
- Julian Sas performing live in 2013

Background information
- Born: 29 May 1970 (age 56); Beneden-Leeuwen, Netherlands
- Genre: Blues rock
- Occupations: Guitarist, singer, songwriter
- Instruments: Guitar, vocals
- Years active: 1994–present
- Label: Various
- Website: Official website

Julian Sas (born 29 May 1970) is a Dutch blues rock guitarist, singer and songwriter. He has released almost 20 studio albums since 1996, with the most recent being the double CD release, Electracoustic on Cavalier Records.

== Life and career ==
He was born in Beneden-Leeuwen, Netherlands, on a boat on the river Waal, and spent his early years living on a vessel moored there. When Sas was six years old, he saw Chuck Berry perform on television and Sas dreamt about owning a guitar. Later when he was eleven, he viewed Jimi Hendrix via the same medium and, after persistent asking, was given a guitar of his own a year later. He began to play in bands at the age of 13 as a singer and guitarist, but had to be content with jamming and backing a few older blues musicians before forming his own ensemble late in 1994. Sas commented "... I am still a dreamer and wandering spirit. Just like the river and that never stands still and keeps going. I was born with a restless soul, who needs new things and travelling and exploring..." Sas drew inspiration for his playing from Hendrix, Peter Green, Johnny Winter, Alvin Lee, Freddie King, and his key influence, Rory Gallagher. In 1996, the Dutch independent record label Dureco released Sas' debut album, Where Will It End!? Sas went on to release numerous discs on the Corazong label, beginning in 1999 with, For the Lost and Found. Sas reached the Dutch Album Top 100 chart both with Wandering Between Worlds in 2009 and the 2012 release, Bound to Roll. Wondering Between Worlds maintained the eclectic approach to music but showed Sas is an old-school bluesman. The band members then included Edwin van Huik (bass guitar) and Lars-Erik van Elzakker (drums).

The opening track of Coming Home (2016) was an upbeat, energetic track "Jump for Joy", balanced against the album's closing track, the reflective ballad, "Walking Home With Angels". Sas commented that Coming Home was, "A very personal album with lots of stories I have been through the last years: loss of friends, the changing world, etc". In 2017, he added an organ player, Roland Bakker, to the band. Over the years, Sas has played with the former band members of Rory Gallagher, being Gerry McAvoy and Brendan O'Neill.

In 2019, Cavalier Records released Sas' studio album, Stand Your Ground. It contained eight new songs penned by Sas, and was recorded analogously in the Van Studios of Jan and Paul Schuurman in Spakenburg, Netherlands in 2018. Nearly three years after the release of Stand Your Ground, Sas and his band released their most recent studio album, Electracoustic. It was a double album set containing the same 12 original songs, recorded in both electric and acoustic versions. Performing alongside Sas (guitars and vocals) were Roland Bakker on Hammond organ and piano, and Lars-Erik Van Elzakker on drums and percussion. It came in the wake of the death of the band's friend and fellow musician, Fotis Anagnostou, which provided Sas with inspiration for his songwriting process.

== Discography ==
=== Albums ===
Year	Title	Record label
1996	Where Will It End!?	Dureco
1997	A Smile to My Soul	Dureco
1999	For the Lost and Found	CoraZong Records
1998	Live	CoraZong Records
2000	Spirits on the Rise	CoraZong Records
2002	Delivered	CoraZong Records
2002	Ragin' River	CoraZong Records
2002	Acoustic	CoraZong Records
2003	Light in the Dark (compilation album)	CoraZong Records
2005	Dedicat10n	CoraZong Records
2005	Twilight Skies of Life	CoraZong Records
2007	Resurrection	Irond Records
2009	Wandering Between Worlds	CoraZong Records
2012	Bound to Roll	Cavalier Records
2016	Coming Home	Cavalier Records
2016	1996–2000	Cavalier Records
2017	Feelin' Alive	Cavalier Records
2018	2000–2005 (compilation album)	Cavalier Records
2019	Stand Your Ground	Cavalier Records
2022	Electracoustic	Cavalier Records
