= Boven-Leeuwen =

- Village
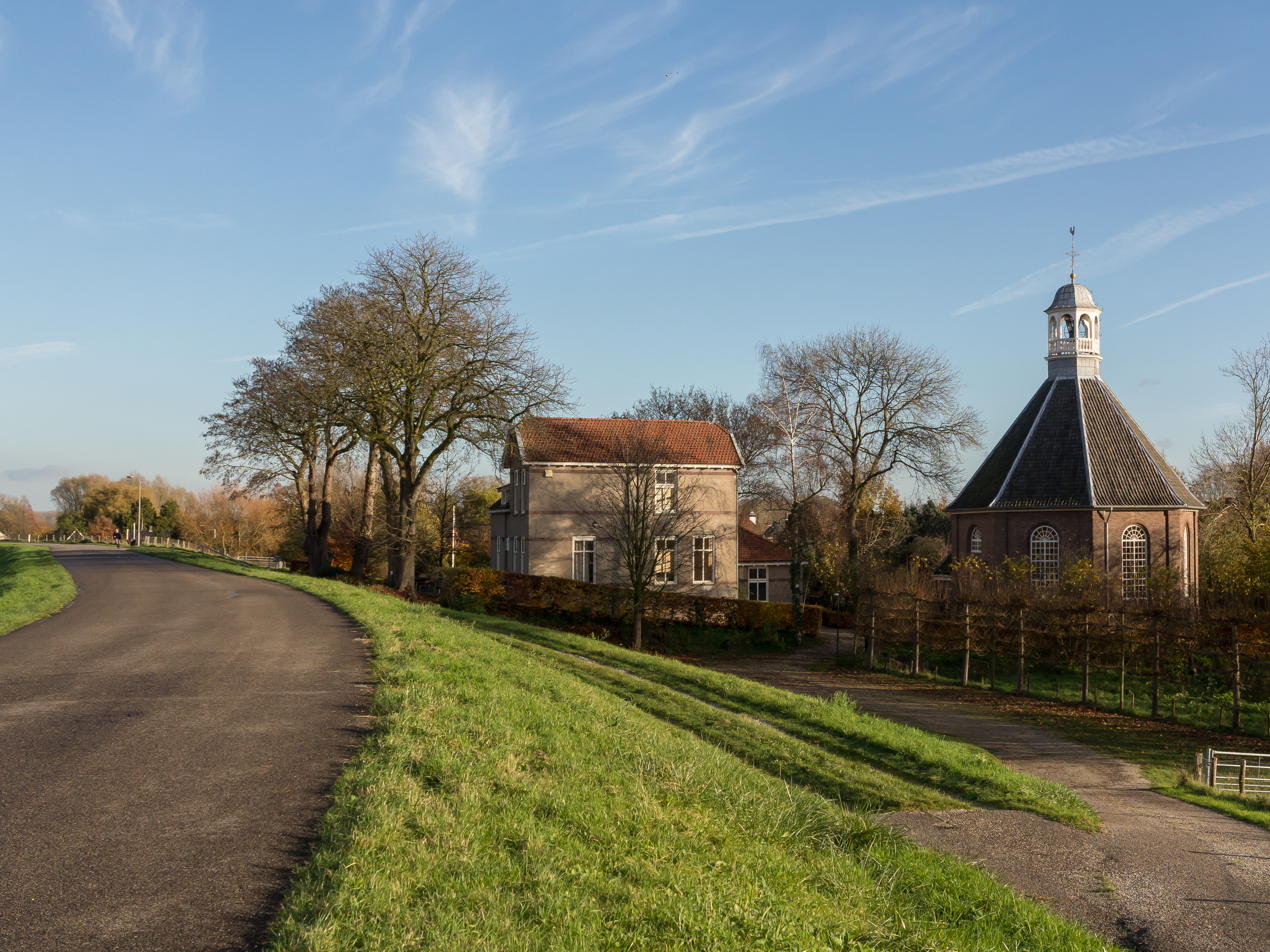
- Boven-Leeuwen, reformed church behind the dyke

- Location in the Netherlands Boven-Leeuwen (Netherlands)
- Coordinates: 51.88555°N 5.54950°E
- Country: Netherlands
- Province: Gelderland
- Municipality: West Maas en Waal

Area
  - Total: 6.51 km^{2} (2.51 sq mi)
- Elevation: 7 m (23 ft)

Population (2021)
  - Total: 2,245
  - Density: 345/km^{2} (893/sq mi)
- Time zone: UTC+1 (CET)
  - Summer (DST): UTC+2 (CEST)
- Postal code: 6657
- Dialing code: 0487

Boven-Leeuwen is a village in the Dutch province of Gelderland. It is a part of the municipality of West Maas en Waal, and lies about 9 km east of Tiel. It is the protestant part of the former village of Leeuwen.

== History ==
It was first called Boven-Leeuwen in 1986 to distinguish from Beneden-Leeuwen. Leeuwen was first attested in the 12th century as Lewen, and means "settlement near burial hill". The village developed along the Waal. In 1898, a Catholic church was built in Beneden-Leeuwen, and the village split in a Catholic (beneden) and a Protestant (boven) village.

The Dutch Reformed church was built between 1753 and 1756. It was severely damaged in 1944/1945, and restored between 1964 and 1966. In 1918, a Catholic church was constructed in Boven-Leeuwen. Huis te Leeuwen is a manor house which was built in 1654 as an extension of a medieval house. In 1819, the estate was demolished except for the gate house and the moat. In 1840, the entire village of Leeuwen was home to 2,128 people.

== People born in Boven-Leeuwen ==
- Airco Caravan (born 1965), artist

== Gallery ==
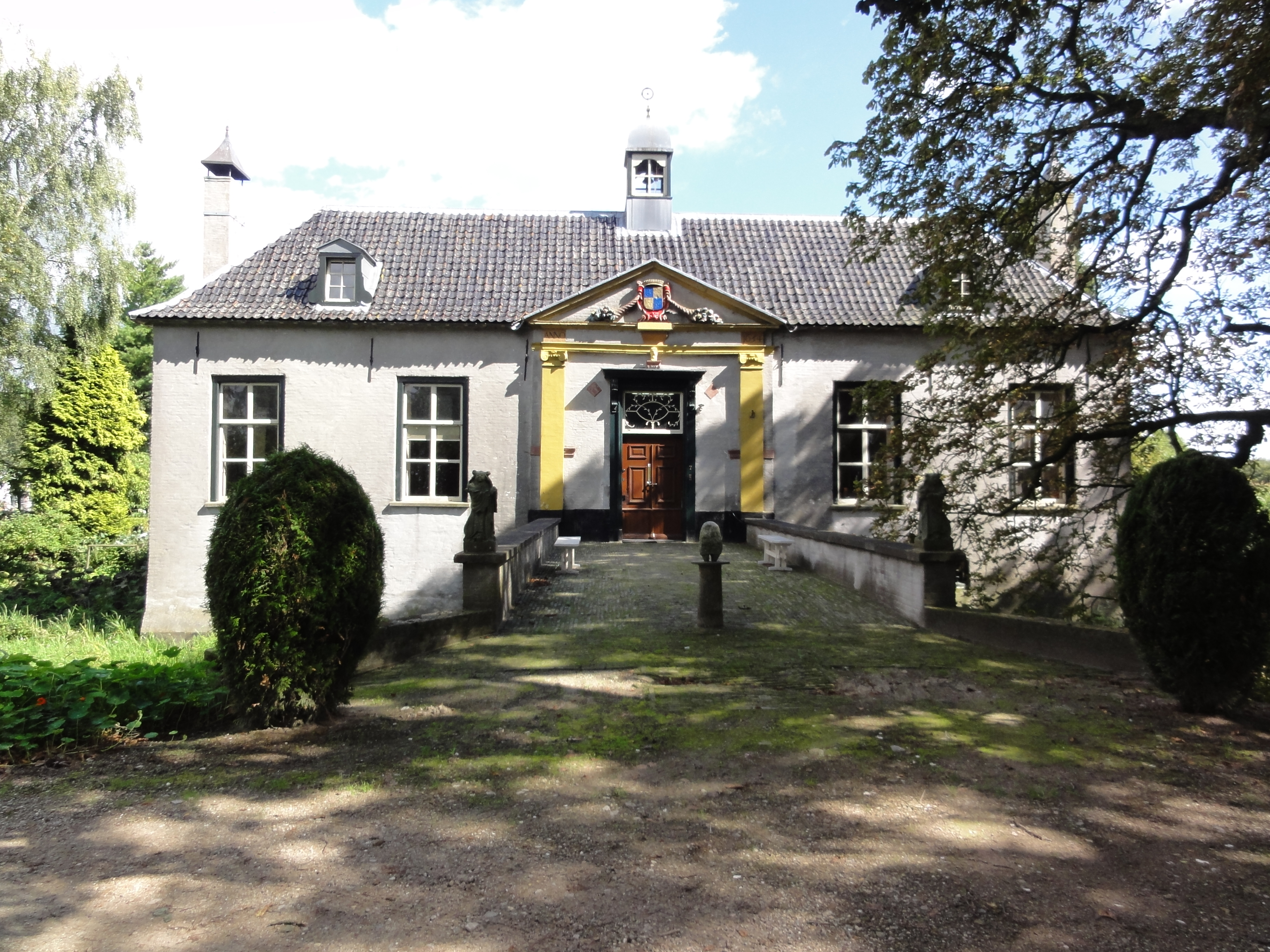
Huis te Leeuwen

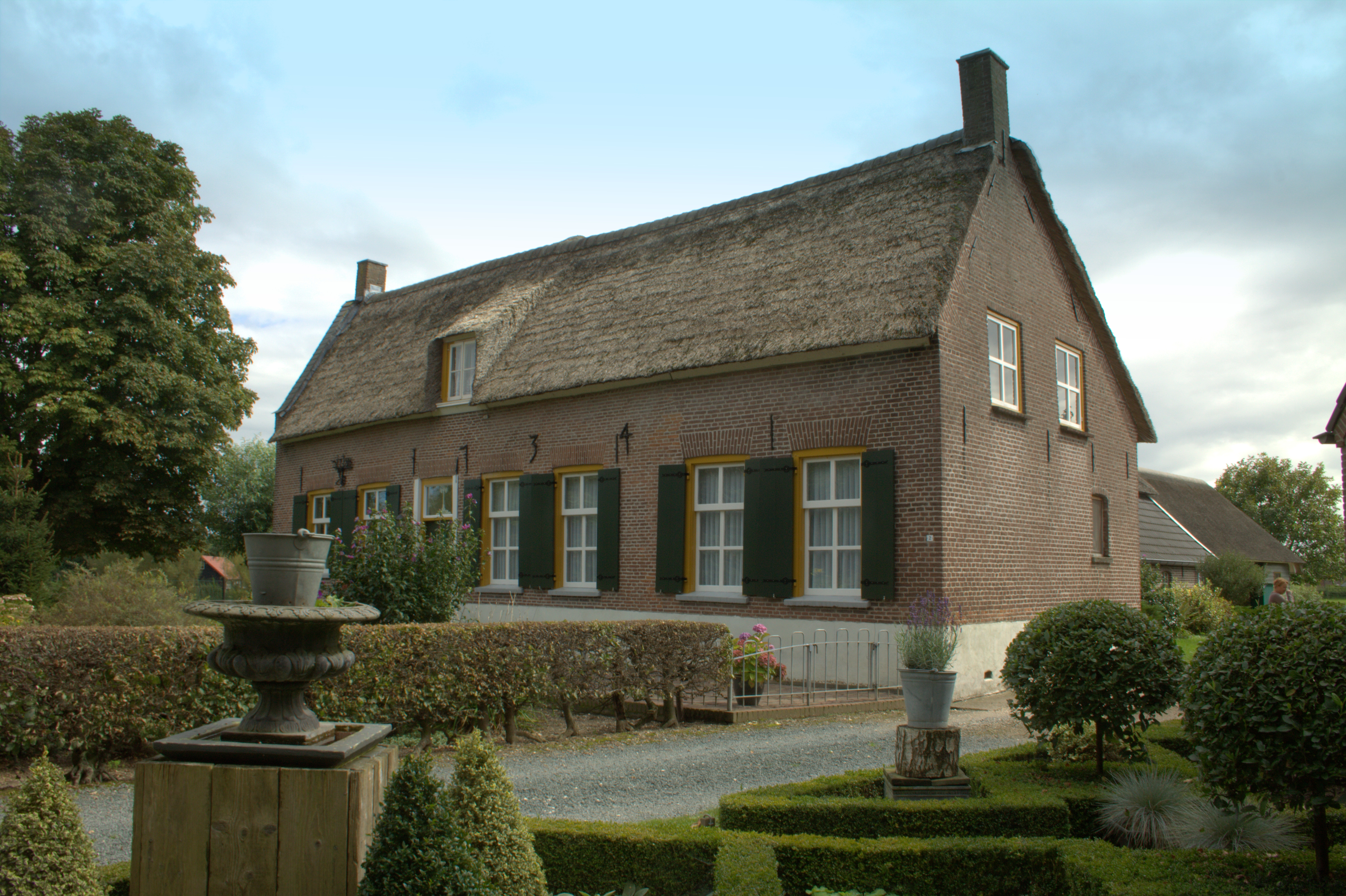
Farm in Boven-Leeuwen

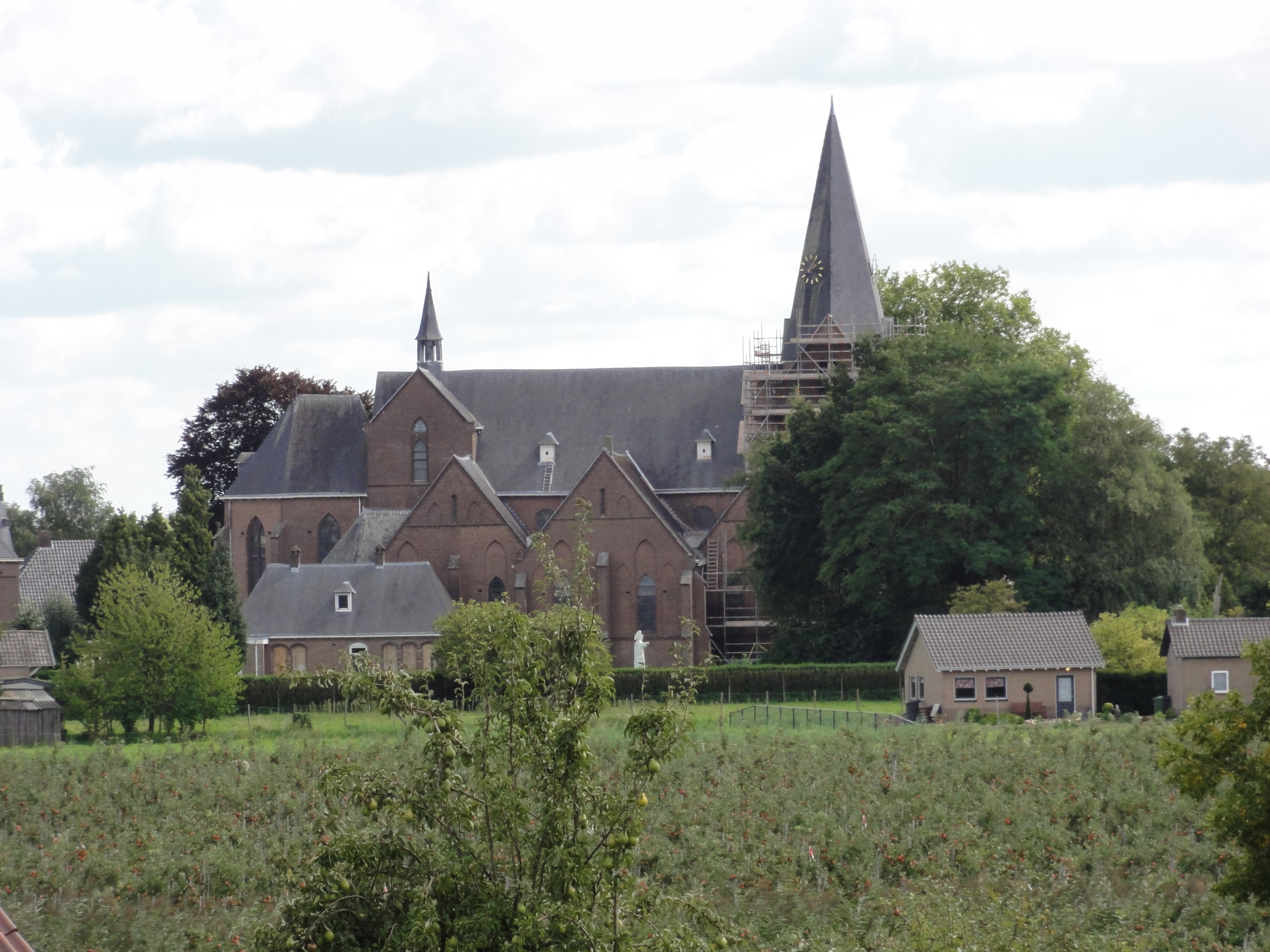
Catholic church

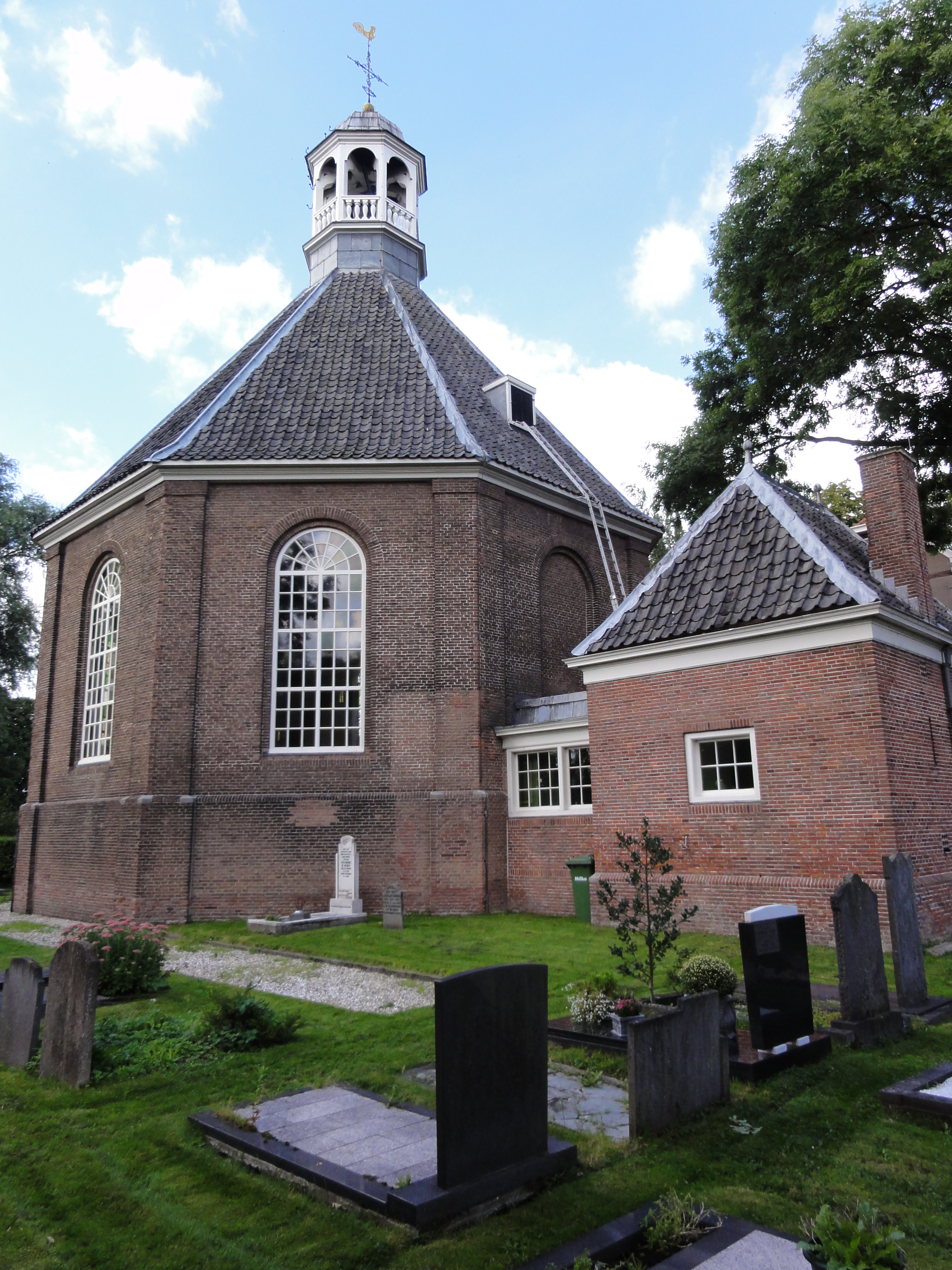
Dutch Reformed church
