= Airco Caravan =

Dutch painter

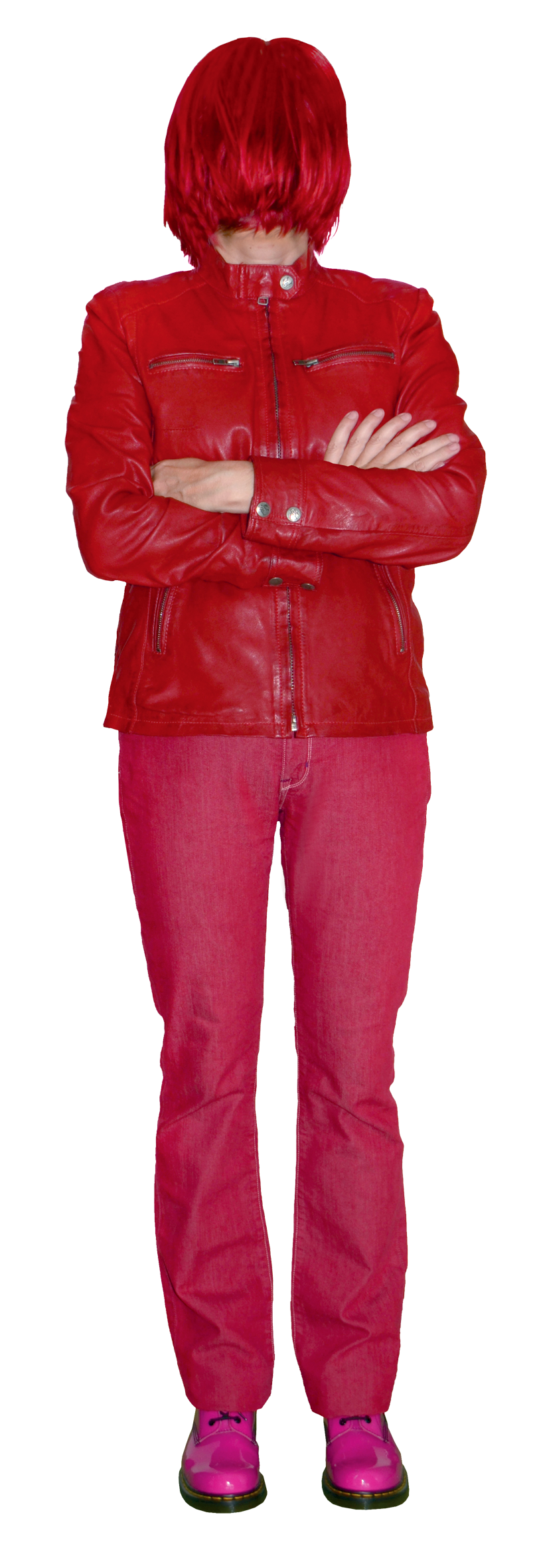
- Airco Caravan, 2014
- Born: Ine Reijnen; May 24, 1965 (age 61); Boven-Leeuwen, Netherlands
- Education: Hogeschool voor de Kunsten Utrecht
- Known for: Painter and Conceptual Artist
- Notable work: Monument for Martin Luther King; Made in China
- Website: www.aircocaravan.com

Airco Caravan (born May 24, 1965) is a painter and conceptual artist based in Amsterdam and New York City.

== Biography ==
=== Early life ===
Airco was born as Ine Reijnen in Boven-Leeuwen, Netherlands on May 24, 1965. She went to high-school at Pax Christi College in Druten, Netherlands and after this she studied art at the Utrecht School of the Arts, graduating in 1988.

=== Early career ===
After art school, Airco went to work as an art director and freelance designer for several years. In 2006 she attended a screen printing course at MK24 in Amsterdam. Slowly she started going back to her first love: painting. In 2011, she went to the Art Students League of New York, where she perfected her oil painting skills. She still calls painting an eternal struggle.

=== Exhibitions and major projects ===
Airco is a women's rights and human rights activist. In 2013, Airco asked 16 different Chinese artists to paint a different part of the face of the Dalai Lama. The artists made a painting of a nose, ear or a peace of skin, while they thought they were painting a mango, curtain or other object. It had to be done this way, because the image of the Dalai Lama is forbidden in China. They sent the pieces to the Netherlands where Airco assembled everything to a portrait. It was offered to the Dalai Lama by the International Campaign for Tibet on his birthday on July 6 2014.

In 2017, she took part in several Nasty Women exhibitions and co-organized the one in Amsterdam at Josilda da Conceição Gallery. The money raised was donated to Women on Waves, COC Amsterdam and She Decides.

On March 21, 2018, the International Day for the Elimination of Racial Discrimination, Airco offered a sculpture of Martin Luther King Jr. to Sylvana Simons at the Open Space Contemporary Art Museum in Amsterdam. With the art project Monument for Martin Luther King, Airco asked two sculptors to create 50 sculptures of King with the intention to connect past and present. John Lewis, Barack and Michelle Obama were among the 49 other recipients of a sculpture.

== Selected solo exhibitions ==
- 2018 Front Gallery, Arti et Amicitiae, Amsterdam
- 2016 Arti Gallery, Rokin 114, Amsterdam
- 2016 The Night of the Dictatorship, De Balie, Amsterdam
- 2016 Open Studios Port Morris, South Bronx, NYC
- 2015 Little Easter Solo show, LES, New York, NY
- 2015 This Art Fair, Beurs van Berlage, Amsterdam
- 2014 Art of What, Gemak, The Hague
- 2014 The Other Side of Light, Art in Redlight, Amsterdam
- 2013 International Window, Arps & Co Gallery, Amsterdam
- 2013 Art in Redlight Art Fair, Beurs van Berlage, Amsterdam
- 2013 Airco Caravan's Cycling Art Gallery, The Hague and Amsterdam

== Personal life ==
Airco is married to BSNSSMN. They reside in Amsterdam and New York.
