= De Wielewaal, Beneden-Leeuwen =

Tower mill in Beneden-Leeuwen, Gelderland, Netherlands

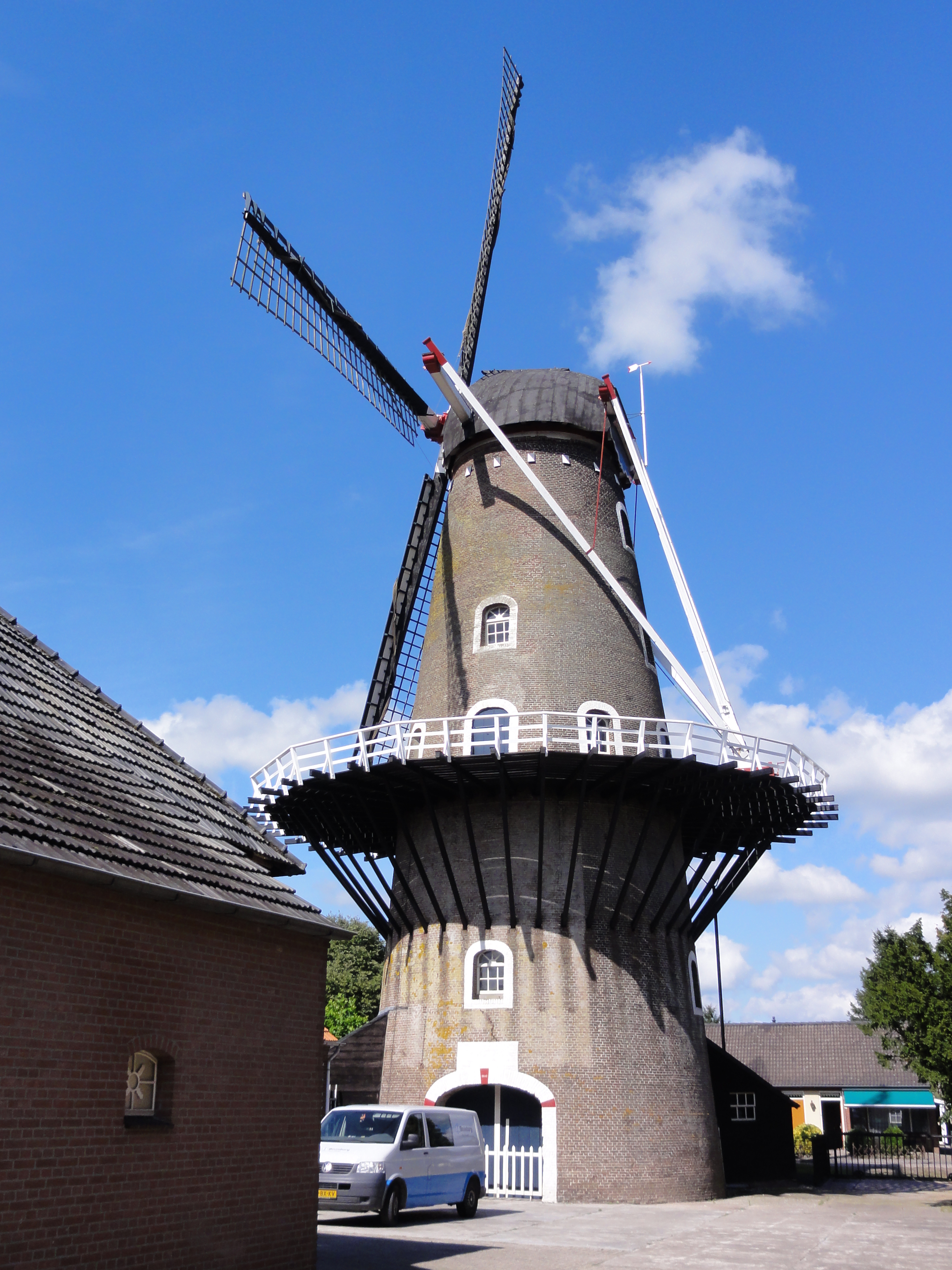
- The mill in September 2010

Origin
- Mill name: De Wielewaal
- Mill location: Molenlaan 10, 6658 BP, Beneden-Leeuwen
- Coordinates: 51°52′55″N 5°30′41″E
- Operator(s): Gemeente West Maas en Waal
- Year built: 1857

Information
- Purpose: Corn mill
- Type: Tower mill
- Storeys: Six storeys
- No. of sails: Four sails
- Type of sails: Common sails
- Windshaft: cast iron
- Winding: Tailpole and winch
- Auxiliary power: Diesel engine and electric motor
- No. of pairs of millstones: Two pairs, plus one pair of engine driven stones and one pair driven by electric motor
- Size of millstones: Two pairs 1.60 metres (5 ft 3 in) diameter, one pair 1.30 metres (4 ft 3 in) diameter, one pair 80 centimetres (2 ft 7 in) diameter

De Wielewaal (English: The Mule) is a tower mill in Beneden-Leeuwen, Gelderland, Netherlands which was built in 1857 and is in working order. The mill is listed as a Rijksmonument.

== History ==
De Wielewaal was built in 1857. It is similar in construction to Zeldenrust, Oss and De Nijverheid, Ravenstein. The three mills were probably built by the same millwright. In the 1930s, improvements were made to the mill. The speed of the millstones was increased by introducing smaller stone nuts. The mill was restored in 1967. In 1999, repairs were done to the sails and stage. The mill was sold to the Gemeente West Maas en Waal in 2002. It is listed as a Rijksmonument, No. 38428.

== Description ==
De Wielewaal is what the Dutch call a "Stellingmolen". It is a six-storey tower mill with a stage. The stage is 9.70 metres (31 ft 10 in) above ground level. The cap is covered in dakleer. The sails are Common sails, which have a span of 25.50 metres (83 ft 8 in). They are carried on a cast iron windshaft. The windshaft also carries the brake wheel, which has 65 cogs. This drives a wallower with 32 teeth, which is situated at the top of the upright shaft. At the bottom of the upright shaft is the great spur wheel, which has 77 cogs. This drives a pair of 1.60 metres (5 ft 3 in) diameter Cullen millstones via a lantern pinion stone nut with 22 staves and a pair of 1.60 metres (5 ft 3 in) diameter French Burr millstones via a lantern pinion stone nut with 23 staves. A 1916 Brons diesel engine drives a pair of 1.30 metres (4 ft 3 in) French Burr stones and an electric motor drives a pair of 80 centimetres (2 ft 7 in) French Burr stones.

== Public access ==
The mill is generally open on Sunday afternoon. or by appointment.
