= Beneden-Leeuwen =

- Town
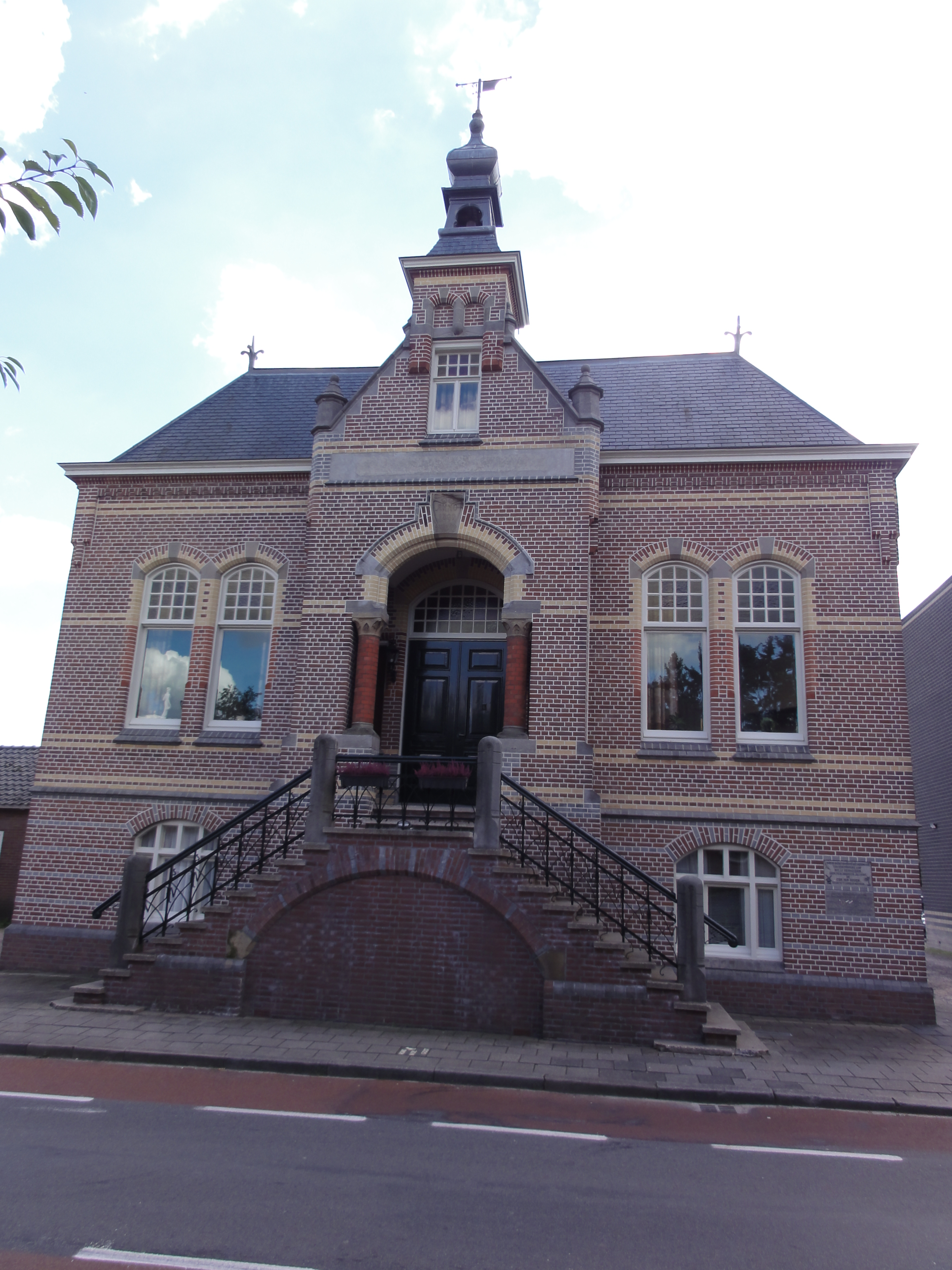
- Former town hall of Beneden-Leeuwen

- Flag

- Location in the Netherlands Beneden-Leeuwen (Netherlands)
- Coordinates: 51°53′N 5°31′E
- Country: Netherlands
- Province: Gelderland
- Municipality: West Maas en Waal

Area
  - Total: 10.31 km^{2} (3.98 sq mi)
- Elevation: 6 m (20 ft)

Population (1 July 2021)
  - Total: 6,925
  - Density: 671.7/km^{2} (1,740/sq mi)
- Time zone: UTC+1 (CET)
  - Summer (DST): UTC+2 (CEST)
- Postal code: 6658
- Dialing code: 0487

Beneden-Leeuwen is a town in the Dutch province of Gelderland. It is a part of the municipality of West Maas en Waal, and lies about 7 km east of Tiel, on the opposite (southern) bank of the river Waal. Beneden-Leeuwen has 6,925 inhabitants on 1 July 2021. It is the Catholic part of the former village Leeuwen.

== History ==
It was first called Beneden-Leeuwen in 1986 to distinguish from Boven-Leeuwen. Leeuwen was first attested in the 12th century as Lewen, and means "settlement near burial hill". The village developed along the Waal. In 1898, a Catholic church was built in Beneden-Leeuwen, and the village split in a Catholic (beneden) and a Protestant (boven) village. The St. Alphonsus de Liguori Church was built between 1898 and 1900. In 1840, the entire village of Leeuwen was home to 2,128 people. Windmill De Wielewaal is a grist mill built in 1857.

== Notable people ==
- Hanneke Hoefnagel (born 1988), gymnast
- Jona Lendering (born 1964), historian
- Marco Pastors (born 1965), politician
- Julian Sas (born 1970), blues rock musician
- Arno van Zwam (born 1969), footballer

== Gallery ==
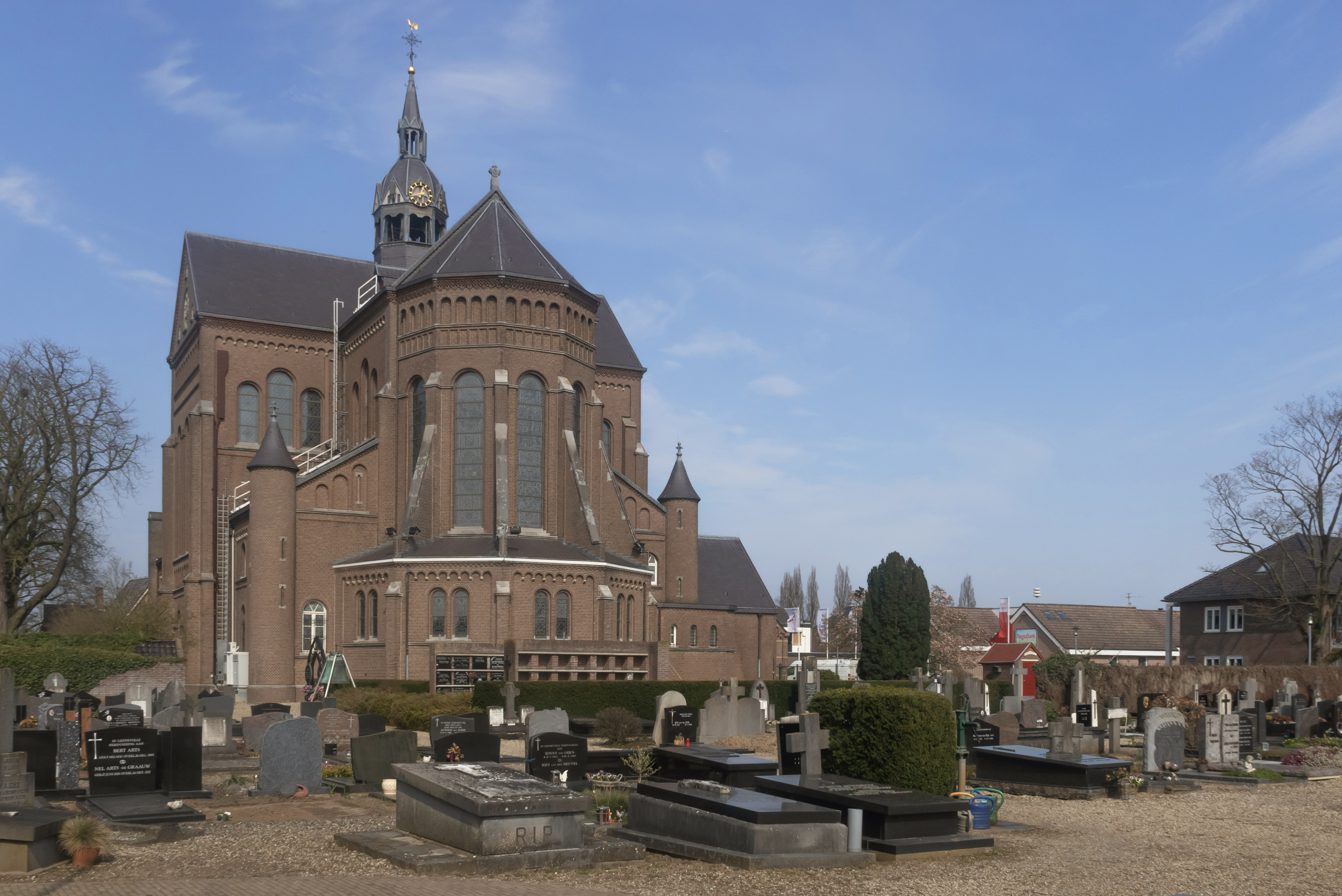
Church: Sint Alphonsus de Liguorikerk

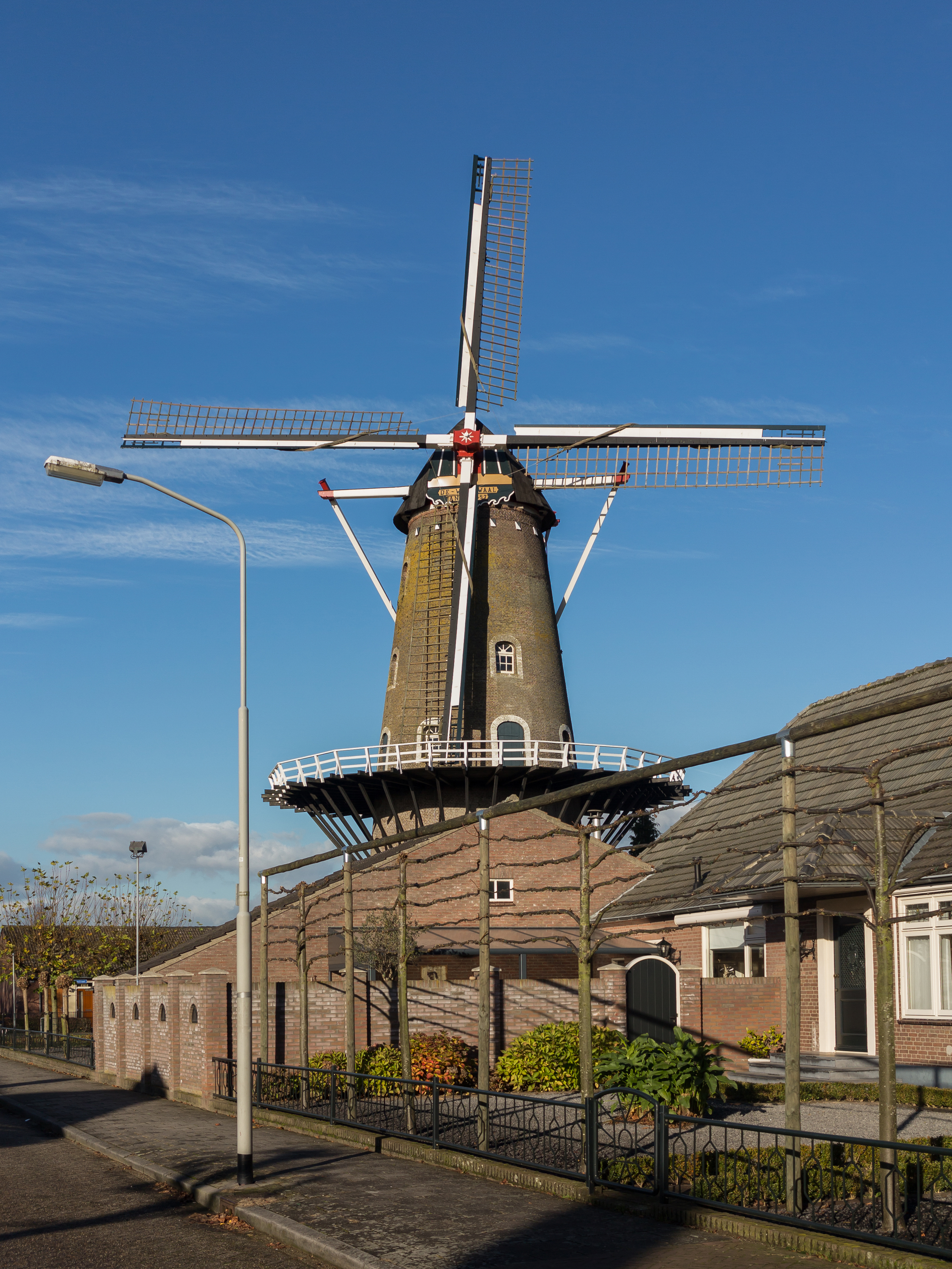
Windmill De Wielewaal

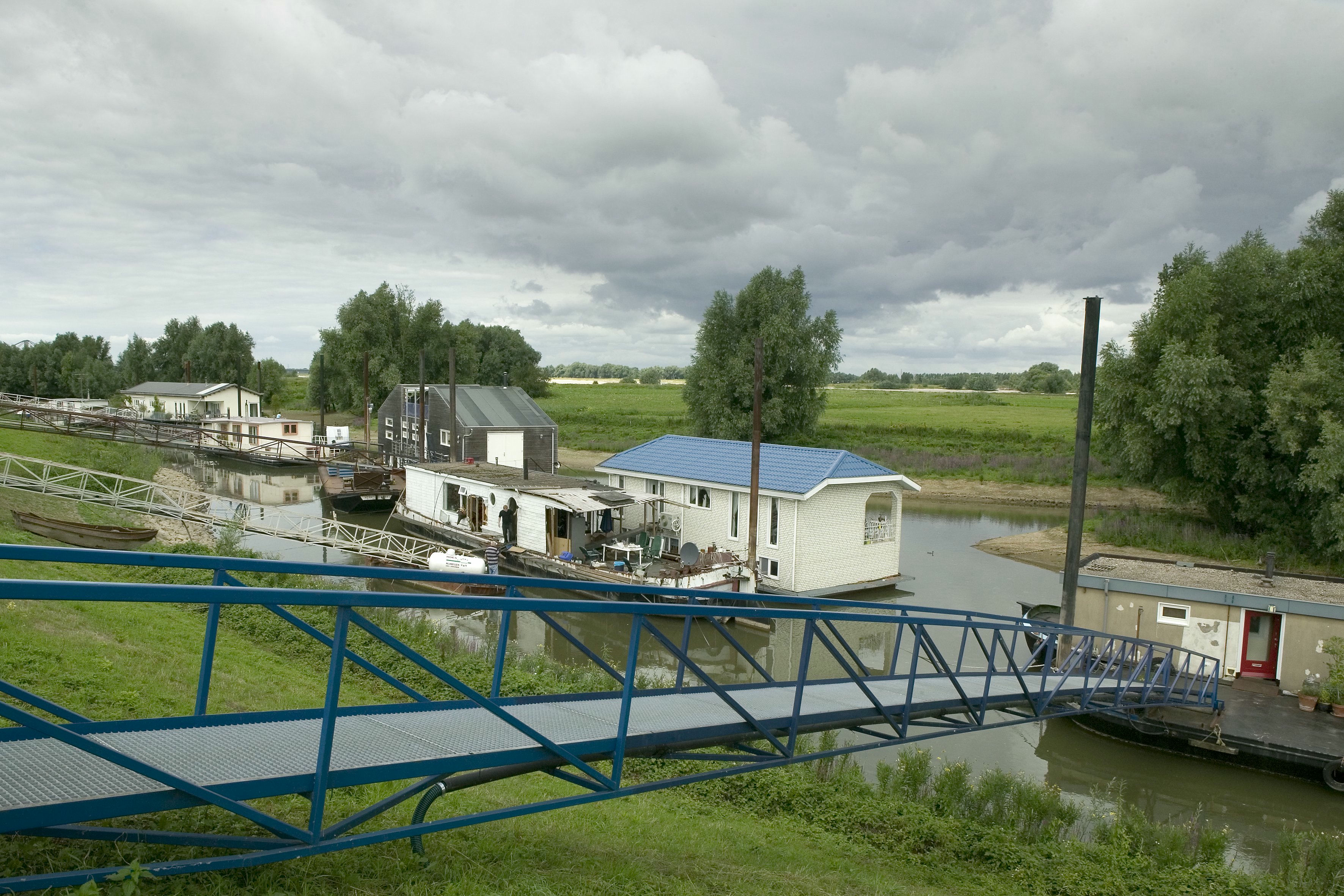
House boats near Beneden-Leeuwen

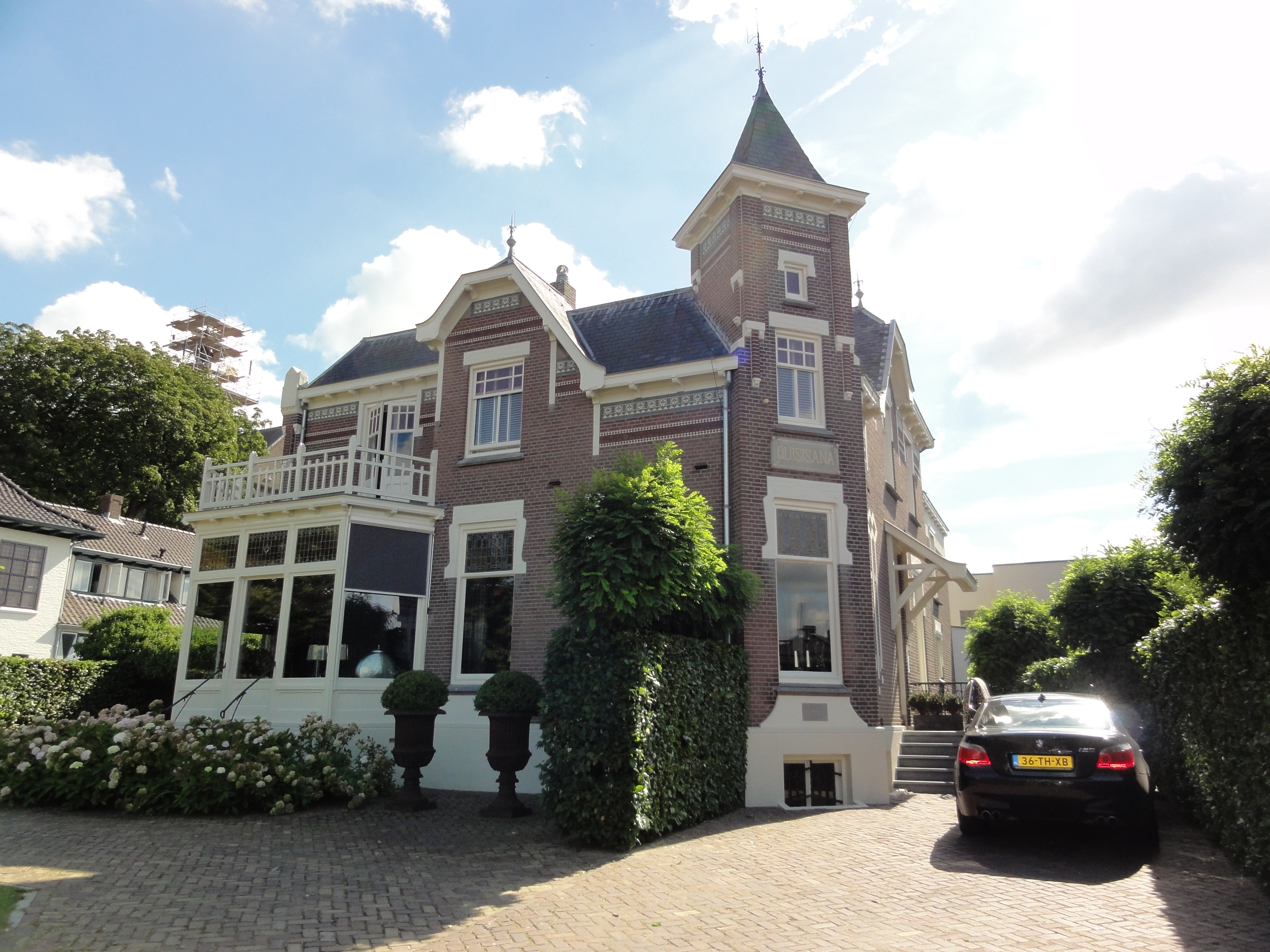
Villa in Beneden-Leeuwen
