= Pamela Sue Anderson =

British philosopher

Pamela Sue Anderson (16 April 1955 – 12 March 2017) was an American philosopher who specialized in philosophy of religion, feminist philosophy and continental philosophy.

In 2007, she was an Official Fellow Tutor in Philosophy and Christian Ethics, Dean, and Women's Advisor of Regent's Park College in the University of Oxford. Her former students include feminist philosopher Hanneke Canters.

Born in Hennepin County, Minnesota, Anderson was educated at Yale University and Mansfield College, Oxford and was formerly Reader in Philosophy at the University of Sunderland. Pamela taught at University of Oxford, where she was working on In Dialogue with Michèle Le Doeuff, translated works of Le Doeuff.

In 2009, she received an honorary degree from the University of Lund in Sweden.

She died of cancer at age 61; she had been ill for two years.

On 17 March 2018, Regent's Park College unveiled a portrait commissioned of Anderson, in recognition of both her academic contributions and her pastoral commitment to the college.

== Selected works ==
Books

- (2010) Kant and Theology. with Jordan Bell. T&T Clark.
- (2006) Revisioning Gender in Philosophy of Religion: the Ethics and Epistemology of Belief. Ashgate.
- (2004) Feminist Philosophy of Religion: Critical readings. Editor with Beverley Clack. Routledge.
- (1998) A Feminist Philosophy of Religion: The rationality and myths of religious belief. Blackwell.
- (1993) Ricoeur and Kant: Philosophy of the will. Scholars Press.

Edited Books

- (2012) New Topics in Feminist Philosophy of Religion: Contestations and Transcendence Incarnate. Springer Netherlands.

Articles

- Anderson, Pamela S. "Postmodern Theology." Ed. Chad Meister and Paul Copan. The Routledge Companion to Philosophy of Religion. 2nd ed. New York: Routledge, 2013. 569–80. Print.
