= De Oversteek =

Road bridge over Waal river at Nijmegen

De Oversteek (The Crossing)
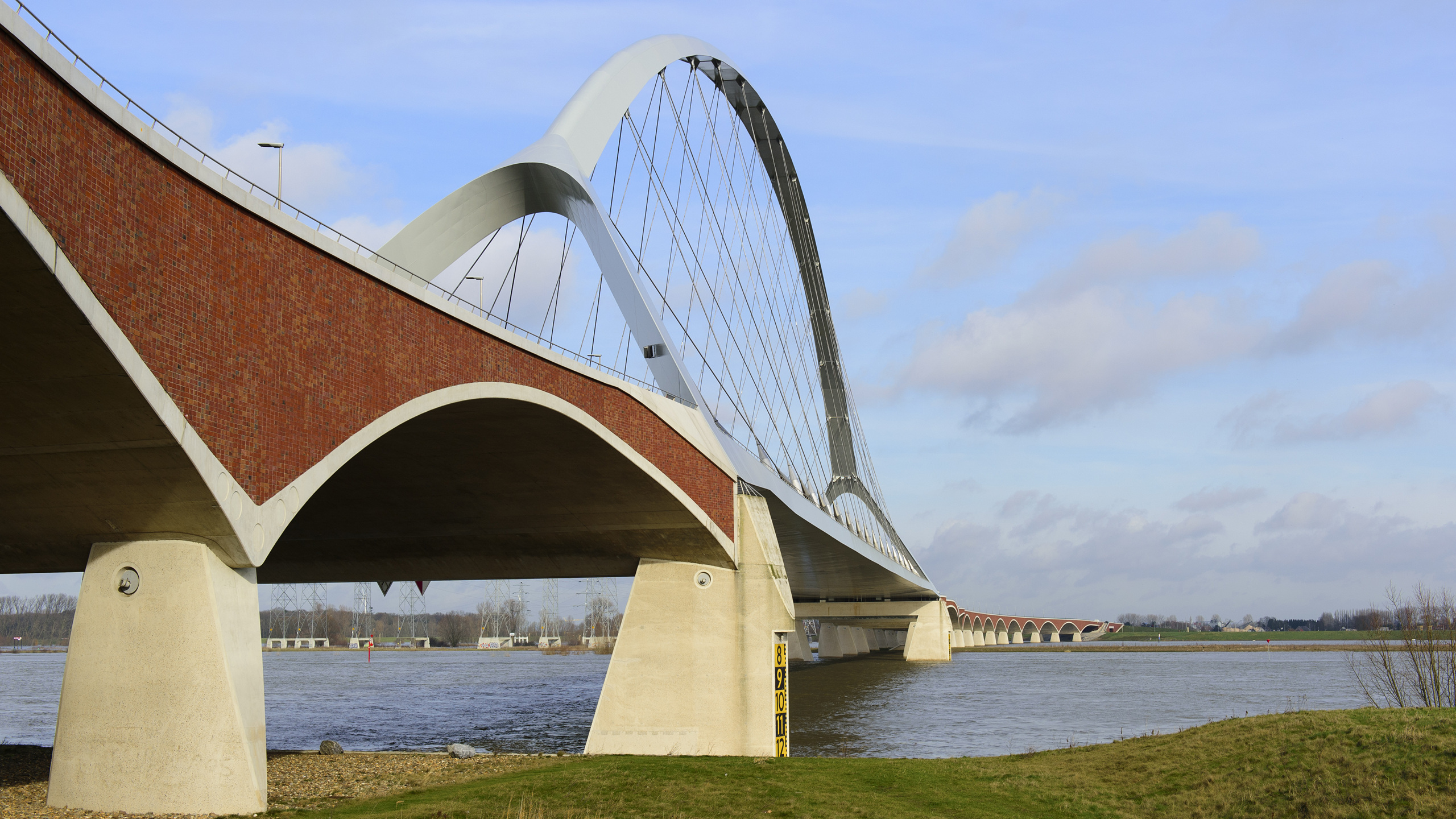
- Coordinates: 51°51′29″N 5°50′28″E
- Carries: Vehicular, pedestrian and bicycle traffic
- Crosses: Waal River
- Locale: Nijmegen, Netherlands
- Other name: Stadsbrug (City Bridge),

Characteristics
- Design: Arch bridge
- Material: Steel, concrete and brick
- Total length: 1,195 metres (3,921 ft)
- Width: 25 metres (82 ft) – 32.5 metres (107 ft)
- Height: 60 metres (200 ft)
- Longest span: 285 metres (935 ft)
- Clearance above: 14.5 metres (48 ft)

History
- Architect: Laurent Ney and Chris Poulissen
- Constructed by: Royal BAM Group and Max Bögl
- Construction cost: €260 million
- Opened: 24 November 2013

Location
- Interactive map of De Oversteek (The Crossing)

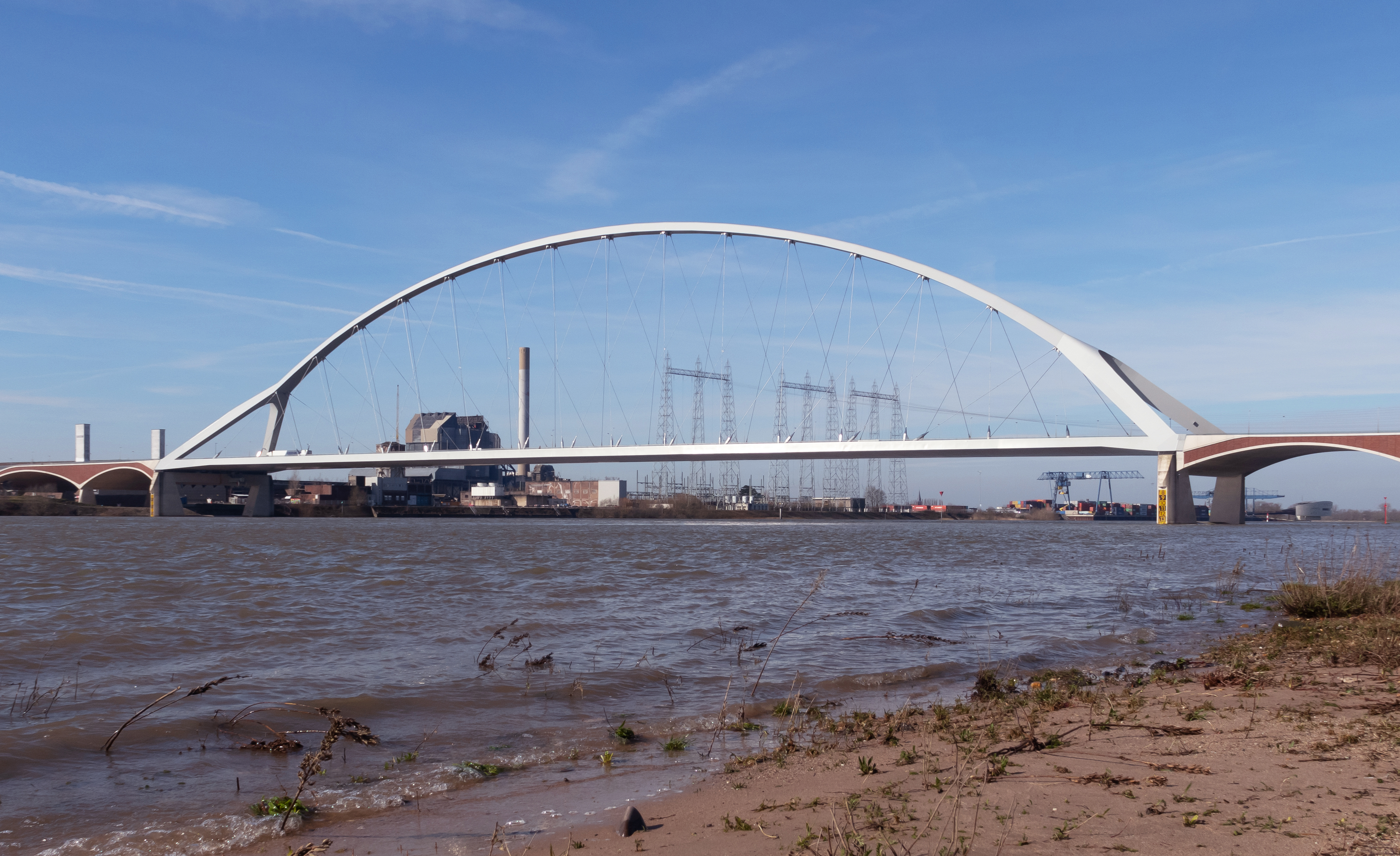
The bridge in 2020

De Oversteek (The Crossing), also called Stadsbrug (City Bridge), is a road bridge over the river Waal in the Netherlands. Opened in 2013, it is situated immediately to the west of Nijmegen city centre. The bridge has four traffic lanes, two in each direction, and a four metre wide shared pedestrian and cycle path.

== History ==
The bridge was proposed to reduce congestion on the existing Nijmegen road bridge, the Waalbrug, 2 km (1.2 mi) east of the new bridge. However concerns were raised on the planned location, as it might attract wider regional traffic, thereby increasing congestion levels. After a review, building commenced in early 2011 and took 30 months to complete, the project jointly undertaken by the Dutch BAM Civie and the German Max Bögl.

It is the longest single arch bridge in Europe and cost an estimated €260 million. It was officially opened on 23 November 2013.

=== Commemorating 1944 ===
The bridge is on the site of the Waal crossing of 20 September 1944, an assault across the river by soldiers of the US 504th Parachute Infantry during Operation Market Garden. The bridge was named after this event, which in Dutch is known as De Oversteek.

The 1944 crossing has remained a theme of the bridge. During the opening ceremony, veterans of the assault and their relatives were present, and tributes were paid to those who died.

Since 19 October 2014, a daily Sunset March has taken place across the bridge. Anyone can participate in the silent march that is led by a military veteran. Participating military veterans can register at Sunset March – A March to Remember those who fought for our Freedom to be the Veteran of the Day and receive a certificate commemorating the march in which they participate. The march begins on the south side of the bridge near the Batavia area and ends at the Waal Crossing Memorial where participating Veterans are invited to render a hand salute to honor the 48 Soldiers who died during the crossing. As a tribute to each lost Soldier, the bridge contains 48 streetlights that light up one by one at the pace of the march.

Since 2016, the road over the bridge has been called the Generaal James Gavinsingel, and the viaduct on the north side the 82e Airborne Divisieviaduct, named after the commander and formation of the 1944 assault troops.

== See also ==
- Waalbrug
- List of bridges in the Netherlands
