= Hanneke Hoefnagel =

- Full name: Hanneke Hoefnagel
- Born: 12 October 1988 (age 37) Beneden-Leeuwen, Netherlands

Gymnastics career
- Discipline: Women's artistic gymnastics
- Country represented: Netherlands
- Club: GTV De Hazenkamp
- Head coach: Boris Orlov
- Eponymous skills: Uneven bars: pike sole circle forward in reverse or L grip with 1/1 turn (360°) in handstand phase
- Retired: 2006

Hanneke Hoefnagel (born 12 October 1988) is a former Dutch gymnast, whose favorite discipline was the beam, but who contributed an eponymous element to the sport on the uneven bars.

== Career ==
=== Early career ===
Hoefnagel was born in Beneden-Leeuwen and started her career in gymnastics in 1993 at a local team in the same city. In 1996 she joined one of the most prestigious club teams in the Netherlands, Nijmegen based GTV De Hazenkamp. She started off in the youth squads, but found herself in the top sport squad of coach Boris Orlov since 1999.

=== Senior career ===
In 2006, she was part of the Dutch national team that took part in the 2006 European Artistic Gymnastics Championships in Volos where they finished in eighth position. Although she finished just in 108th position in the senior allround discipline, she reached the junior top 10 at the eighth position. Later that year she also was part of the team that participated in the 2006 World Artistic Gymnastics Championships in Aarhus where the Netherlands finished in 15th position, claiming a ticket for the 2007 edition in Stuttgart, the tournament that will be the 2008 Summer Olympics qualification. In the individual allround competition she finished in 66th position out of 223 participants.

Although 2006 was her international breakthrough year it was also the year of the end of her career. On 11 December 2006, two months after her 18th birthday she decided to concentrate on her social life instead of training daily to become better in gymnastics.

== Eponymous skill ==
Hoefnagel has one eponymous skill listed in the Code of Points.

Apparatus	Name	Description	Difficulty (Note: Valid for the 2025–2028 Code of Points)
Uneven bars	Hoefnagel	Piked sole circle (toe-on) forward in reverse or L grip with full turn in handstand	D (0.4)
