= Waalbrug =

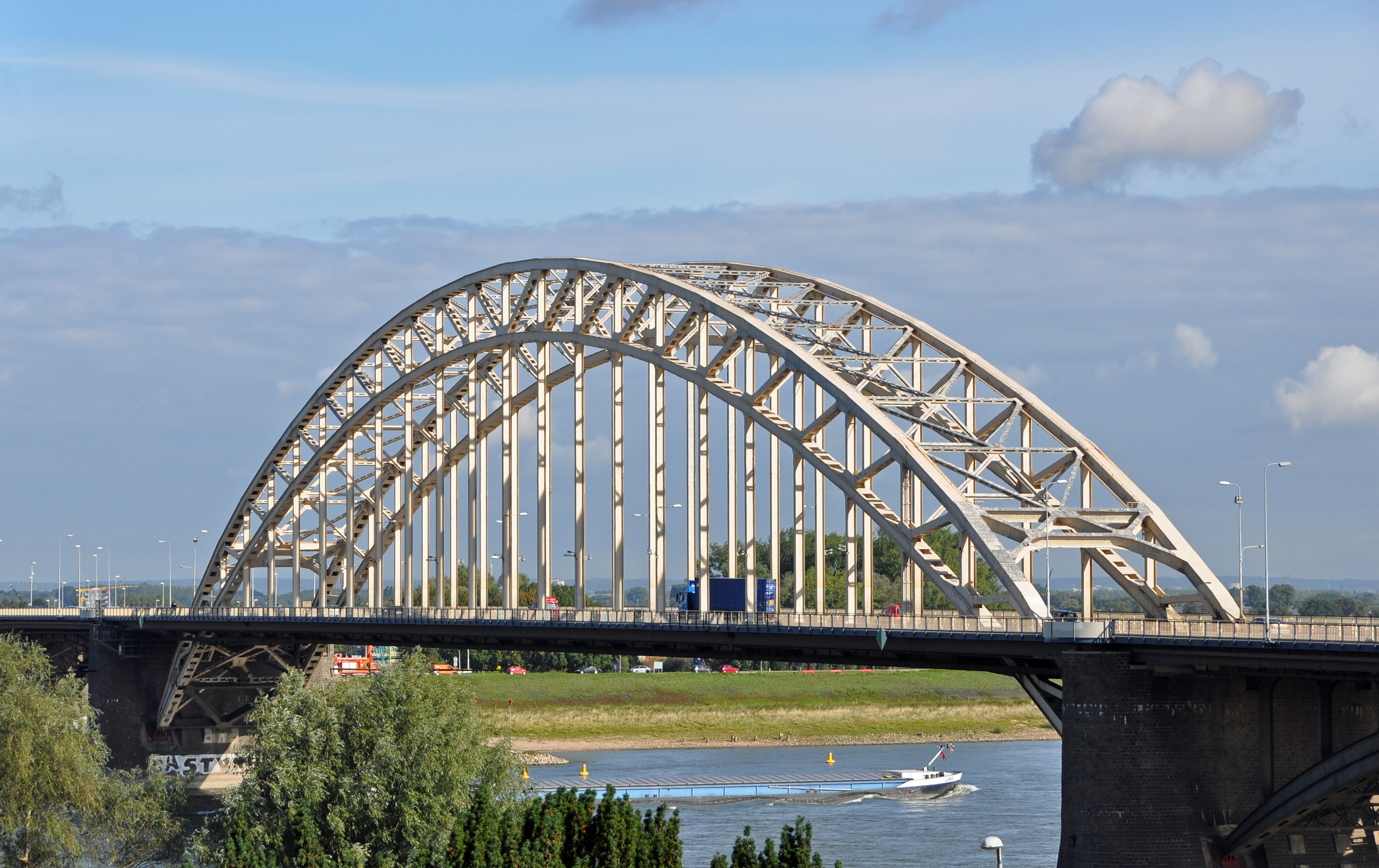
- Coordinates: 51°51′4″N 5°52′18″E
- Carries: Vehicular traffic
- Crosses: Waal River
- Locale: Nijmegen, Netherlands

Characteristics
- Design: Arch bridge
- Material: Steel
- Total length: 604 metres (1,982 ft)
- Width: 26.5 metres (87 ft)
- Height: 65 metres (213 ft) (arch)
- Longest span: 244.1 metres (801 ft)

History
- Opened: 16 June 1936

Statistics
- Daily traffic: 50,000

Location
- Interactive map of Waalbrug

The Waalbrug is an arch bridge over the Waal River in Nijmegen, Gelderland, the Netherlands. The full length of the Waalbrug is 604 metres (1,982 ft), the middle of the arch being about 65 metres (213 ft) high. The arch itself is 244.1 metres (801 ft) long and was the longest arch in Europe at the time of construction.

Unlike many other bridges from the same period and with the same construction, such as the IJsselbrug near Zwolle, the Graafsebrug and the John Frost Bridge at Arnhem, the Waalbrug is an arch bridge in the literal sense: all forces truly work on the two pylons.

== History ==
The bridge was opened on 16 June 1936 by Queen Wilhelmina of the Netherlands in the presence of 200,000 people.

Until 1936 there had been no permanent connection for local road traffic across the Waal. All traffic had to use the Zeldenrust (seldom rest) ferry. Train traffic had used the Nijmegen railway bridge since 1879.

In 1906 the Nijmegen Vooruit (Nijmegen Ahead) committee started planning for the construction of the Waalbrug, but the First World War delayed the project. In 1927, definitive plans had been made by architect G. Schoorl, and construction of the bridge started on 23 October 1931.

On 10 May 1940, at the start of the German invasion of the Netherlands, Dutch combat engineers blew up the bridge to stop the German army's advance.

In 1944 the Germans planned to blow up the bridge again, but Jan van Hoof, a Rover Scout and member of the Dutch Resistance, managed to prevent this. On 20 September 1944, the bridge was captured by allied forces during Operation Market Garden. A plaque was added to the bridge to commemorate van Hoof's actions.

The bridge was painted green until 1980; these days it is white.

== Traffic ==
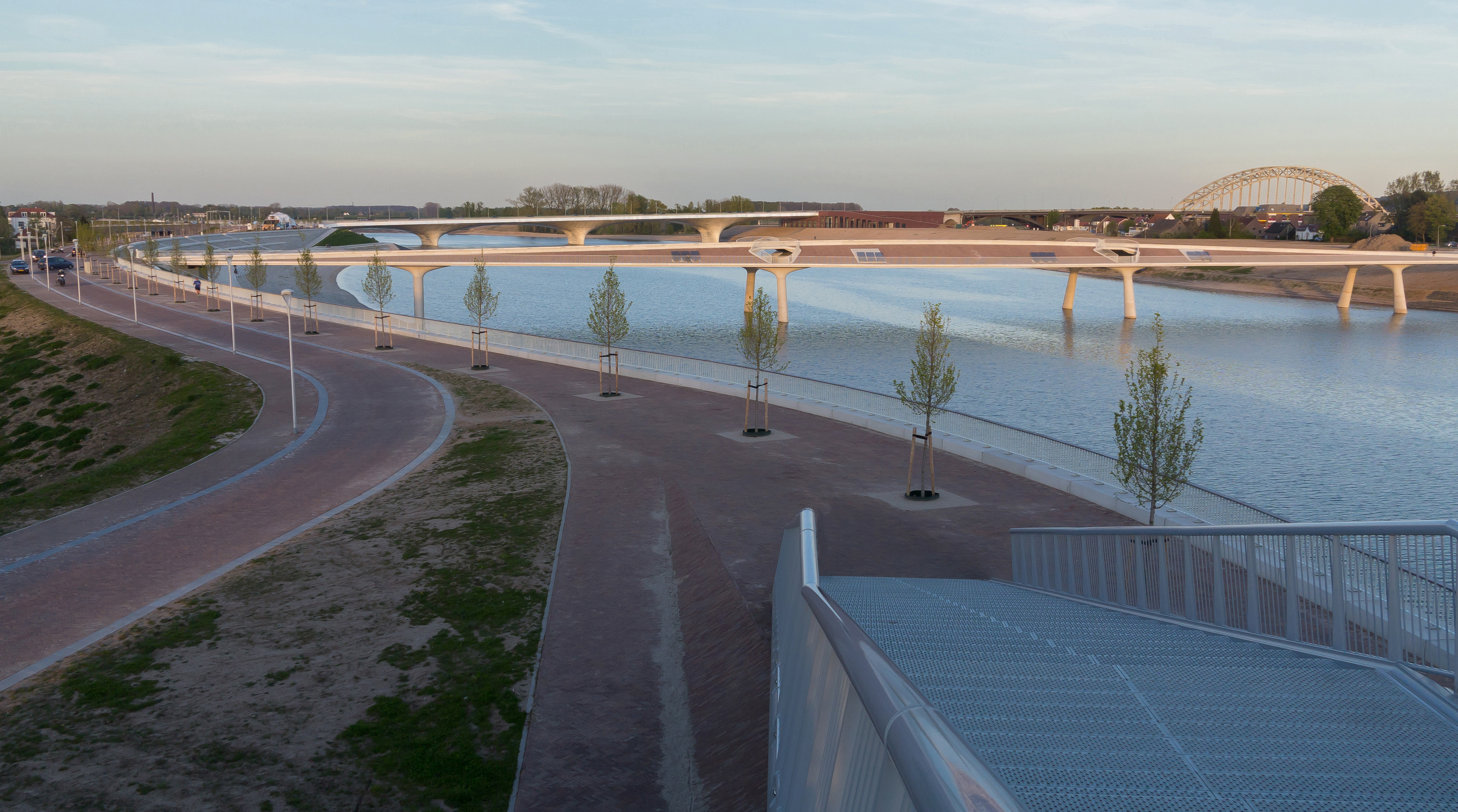
The (Verlengde) Waalbrug and the Lentloper

Over the years the volume of traffic on the bridge increased, with regular rush hour traffic jams. By 2005 over 50,000 vehicles used the bridge every 24 hours.

To ease congestion a new road bridge, De Oversteek ('The Crossing'), was built 2 kilometres (1.2 mi) downstream, opening on 24 November 2013. For cyclists there is the Snelbinder Bridge, which is connected to the rail bridge; it opened in 2004.

Once de Oversteek opened, the Waalbrug was closed briefly for renovation work.

== In popular culture ==
The Waalbrug can be found in the 1977 film A Bridge Too Far; the non-fiction book Band of Brothers; and the computer games Medal of Honor: Frontline, Medal of Honor: Vanguard, Medal of Honor: Airborne, Gates of Hell: Airborne and Battlefield V.
