= Hanneke Jansen =

Computational chemist

Johanna M. Jansen, Ph.D.
- Other name: Hanneke
- Education: Rijksuniversiteit Groningen, Uppsala University
- Scientific career
- Thesis: Three Dimensions in Drug Design: Probing the melatonin receptor
- Website: https://www.novartis.com/our-science/postdoc-program/leadership/johanna-hanneke-jansen-phd

Johanna Maria "Hanneke" Jansen is a computational chemist working at Novartis on multiple drug targets. She previously worked at Astra and at Chiron Corporation.

== Education ==
Jansen received her doctoral degree from the University of Groningen (The Netherlands) in 1995, studying computational medicinal chemistry. Her dissertation topic concerned 3D modeling of the melatonin receptor, including work on synthesizing and separating analytes to probe its chemistry. She completed a postdoctoral fellowship at Uppsala University in 1997. Her work there related to modeling receptor interactions of drug leads to judge their serotonergic or dopaminergic activities.

== Research ==
Much of Jansen's oeuvre uses in silico methods to study receptor biology, drug design, and drug-protein interactions. An early study (2000) while she was employed at Chiron looked at conformations of the anti-cancer treatment Taxol in nonpolar environments.

In a 2012 commentary for Future Medicinal Chemistry, Jansen led a team of distinguished computational chemists in a call to action, namely that standardized data sets be used across the industry, and that sharing program code between groups at different companies and institutions should be mandated.

A 2017 open-access study in PLoS One related some of Novartis' work - spearheaded by Jansen - to study the oncogenic protein RAS through inhibitors that targeted its inactive conformations.

== Volunteer service ==
Jansen has served the ACS division on Computers in Chemistry since at least 2007, holding multiple leadership positions. Outside of pharmaceutical work, she is perhaps best known as a co-Founder and Steering Committee member for the Teach-Discover-Treat initiative, which creates challenges for students and young professionals to design drugs against neglected diseases such as malaria or Trypanosoma using computational chemistry shared data sets and screens.

== Awards ==
- 2012 - ACS ChemLuminary Award
- 2011 - Fellow of the American Chemical Society
