= Hanneke Canters =

Dutch feminist philosopher and academic

Wilhelmina Johanna Canters (21 July 1969 – 6 September 2002), known as Hanneke Canters, was a Dutch feminist philosopher and academic.

Canters studied Theology and Philosophy at the University of Groningen. She went on to study the philosophy of religion with feminist philosopher and theologian Professor Grace Jantzen at King's College, London University. Canters was awarded a Master of Arts degree. Following this Canters won a scholarship to study for a doctorate at the University of Sunderland under the supervision of Dr. Pamela Sue Anderson and Dr. John Mullarkey.

Her thesis was a study of the Belgian feminist philosopher and former Lacanian psychoanalyst Luce Irigaray, which is the basis of her book Elemental Passions. Canters developed a terminal illness not long after and died in Leiden in September 2002. Her doctoral thesis was published as a joint work by her former supervisor Jantzen in 2006.

== Bibliography ==
- Canters, H. & Jantzen, G.M. (2006) Forever Fluid: A reading of Luce Irigaray's Elemental Passions. Manchester: Manchester University Press. ISBN 0-7190-6380-9
- Canters, H. (1998) Vrouwen die spreken en gehoord worden/Women who speak and are heard, in M.De Haardt, E. Maeckelberghe, E.M. v. Dijk. eds. Geroepen om te spreken: Over verbeelding en creativiteit in theologie en pastoraat. Kampen: Kok Pharos. pp 91-102
- Canters, H. (2000) Luce Irigaray: beelden voor een vrouwelijk subject: proeve van een feministische godsdiensfilosofie. -Katern I-VII. In: Fier; jaargang 03:nr01 (2000)
- Irigaray, L. (1982) Passiones élémentaires. France: Editions de Minuit; ISBN 2-7073-0607-X
- Irigaray, L. (1992) Elemental Passions. London: Routledge; ISBN 0-415-90692-X
