= Nijmegen railway bridge =

Nijmegen Railway Bridge
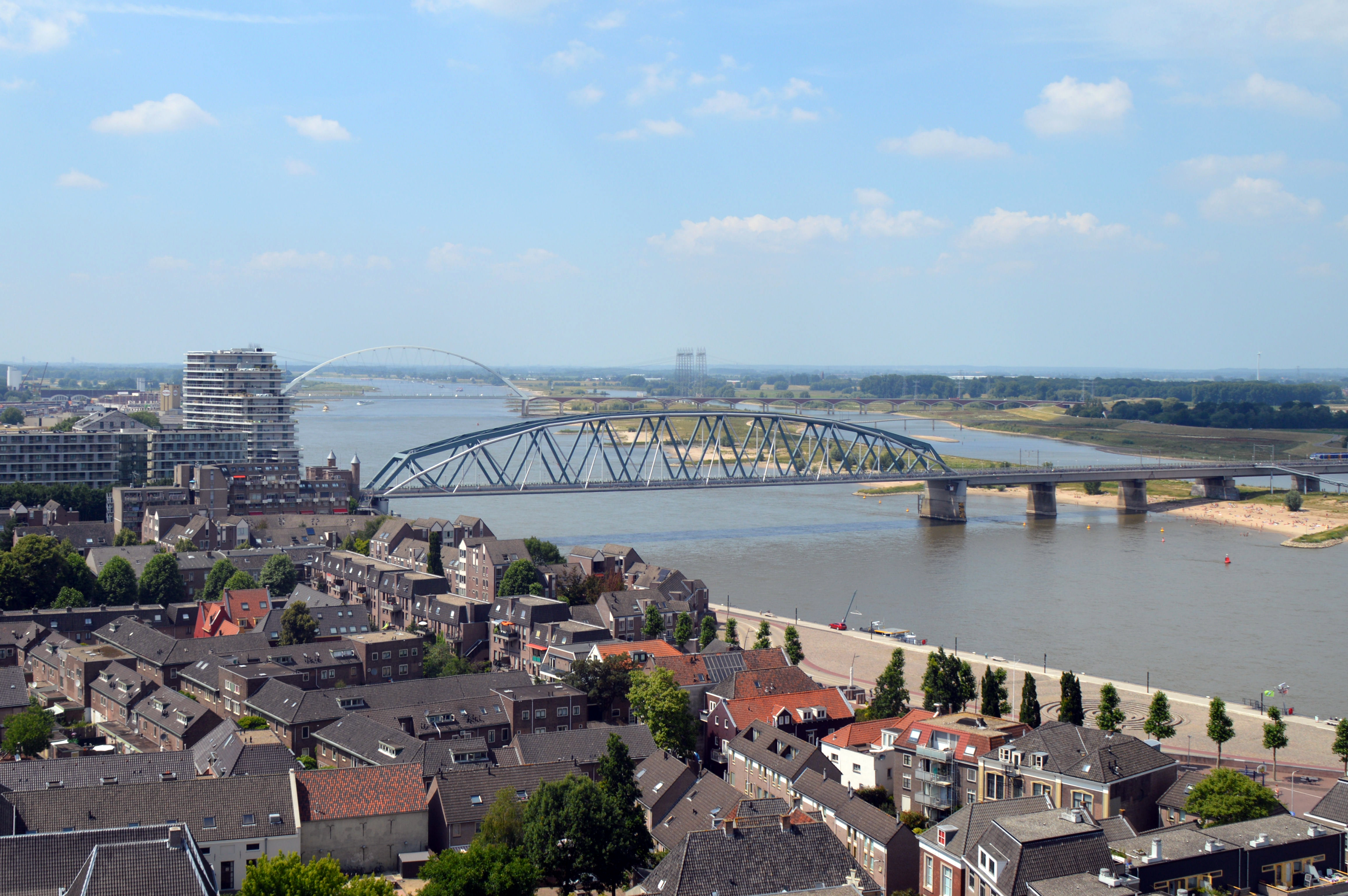
- The railway bridge and attached 'Snelbinder' cycle bridge.
- Coordinates: 51.8519°N 5.8566°E
- Carries: 2 railway lines and bicycles
- Crosses: Waal river
- Locale: Nijmegen, Netherlands
- Official name: Nijmegen Bridge

Characteristics
- Design: Truss bridge
- Total length: 675 metres (2,215 ft)
- Longest span: 225 metres (738 ft)
- Clearance above: 23.1 metres (75 ft 9 in)

History
- Opened: 1879; 1983
- Closed: Destroyed twice during World War II. Was rigged to blow by the Germans, but American Allies defused the charges.

Location
- Interactive map of Nijmegen Railway Bridge

The Nijmegen railway bridge (Dutch: Spoorbrug Nijmegen) is a truss bridge spanning the River Waal in the Netherlands, connecting the city of Nijmegen to the town of Lent.

== Construction ==
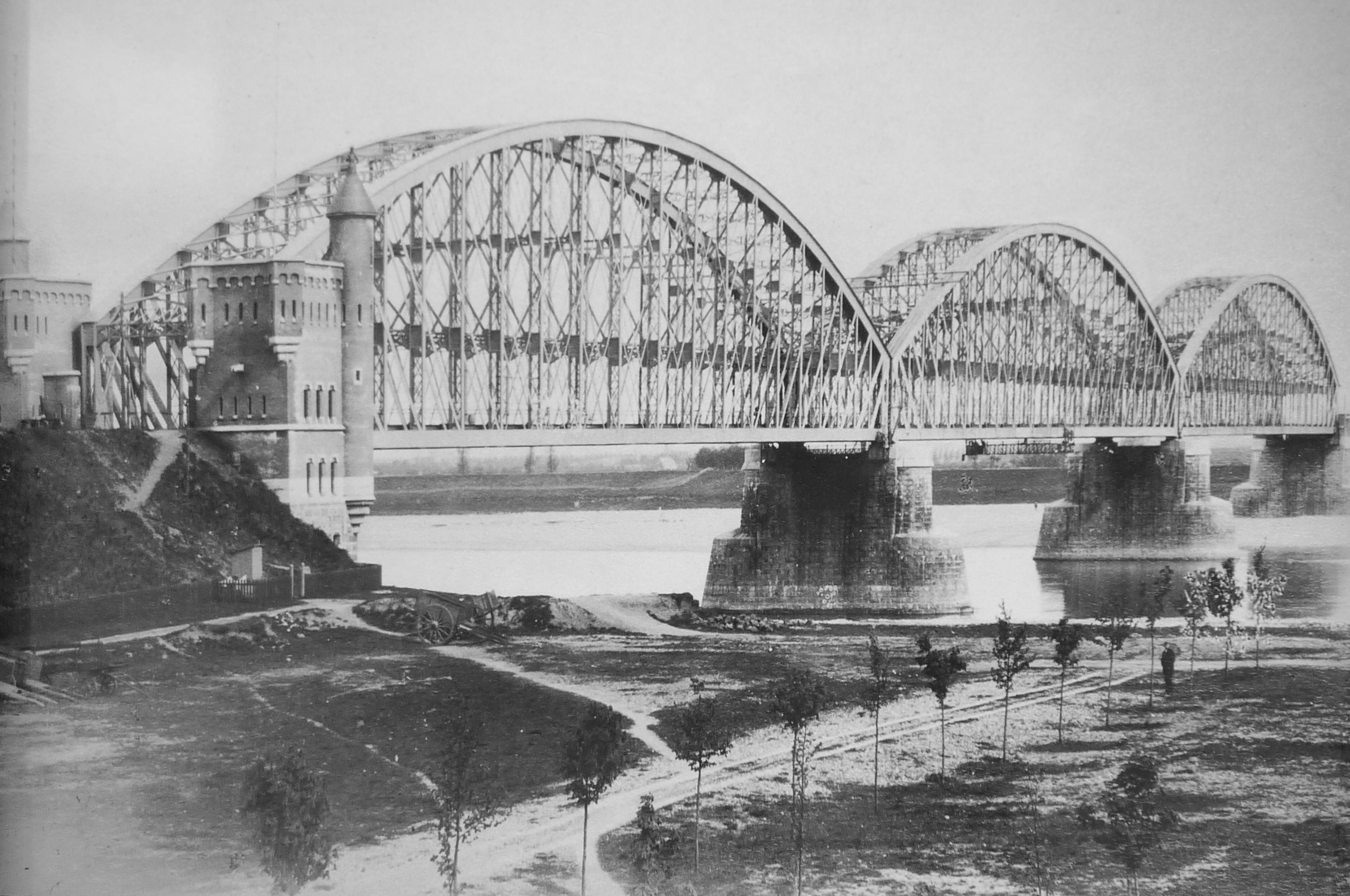
The original Nijmegen railway bridge in 1879.

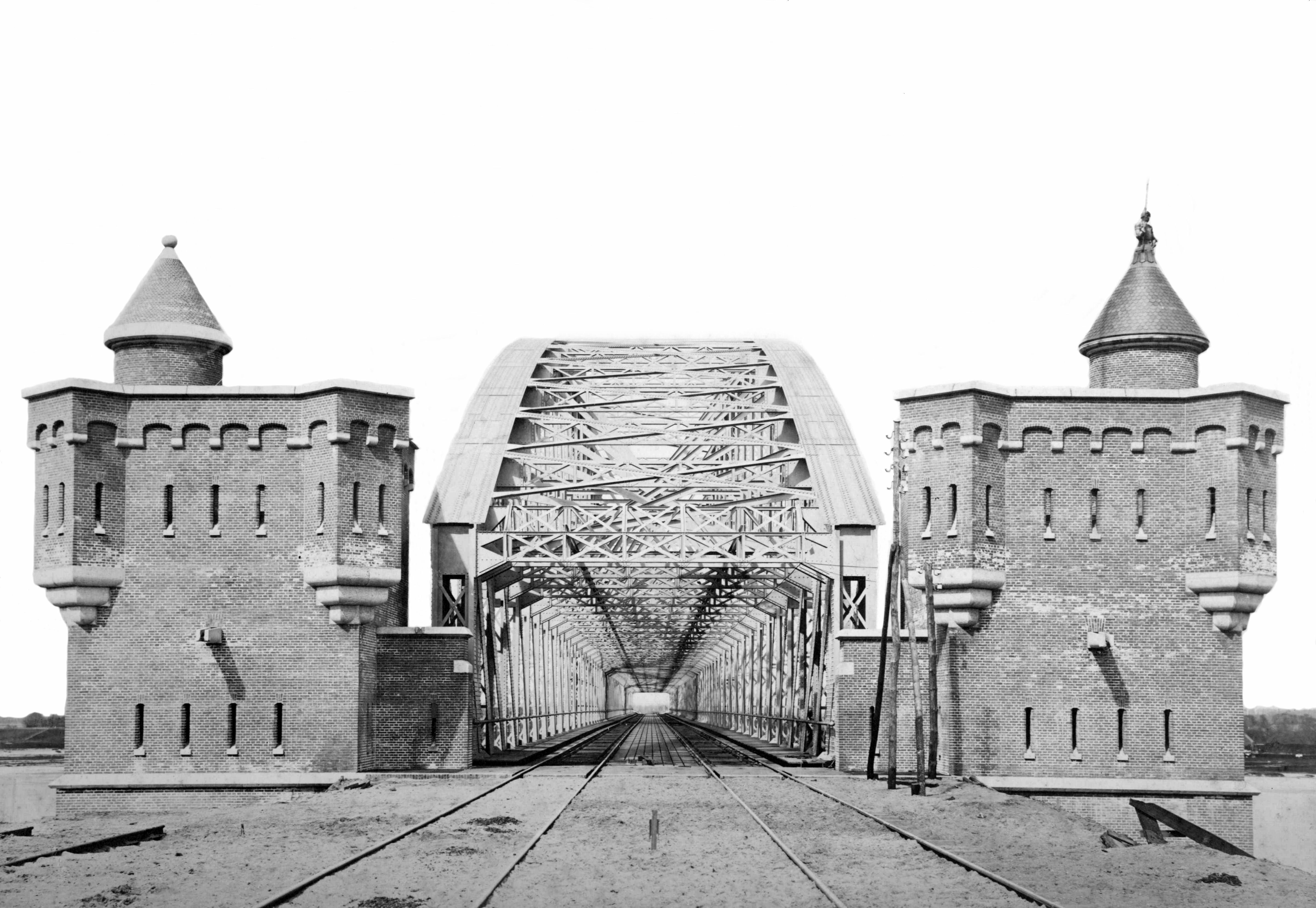
The medieval style abutment towers.

Construction started in 1875, on the site of an ancient Roman bridge, and was completed 4 years later in 1879. It originally consisted of three truss arches. The southern land abutment, styled as a medieval city gate, was designed by Dutch architect P.J.H Cuypers. These twin tower structures, one each side of the track, were to protect the entrance to the city of Nijmegen and delay any enemy advance to give time to demolish the bridge.

The railway bridge's construction enabled train connections to Arnhem, thus Nijmegen was the last major city in the Netherlands to be connected to the national rail network.

== Second World War ==
The middle arch of the bridge was destroyed twice during the Second World War, but despite this it survived the conflict. The first demolition was initiated on 10 May 1940 by the Dutch themselves when the Wehrmacht approached. The Germans repaired the bridge, and it was back in service by 17 November 1940.

The Germans modified the abutments by removing the top floor of each tower, strengthening the flat roofs and mounting anti-aircraft guns. The bridge was involved in Operation Market Garden, and was a key Allied objective. The 82nd Airborne Division's assault on the bridge in September 1944 received the nickname "Little Omaha" due to the heavy casualties, and became a significant turning point in the battle.

Despite the efforts of the Americans, German frogmen were able to demolish the bridge again on 28 September 1944.

== Reconstruction ==
To facilitate passage by larger ships, the bridge was reconstructed in 1983, still in the truss style but with only one wider arch. The bridge was also raised by one metre. Only the brick abutment remains from the original structure. This abutment was to be demolished during the reconstruction, but protests from Nijmegen residents prevented this and it was declared a national monument, and in 2008 the third level was rebuilt from the original plans.

In 2004, a bicycle bridge known as the Snelbinder was added to the eastern side of the bridge.

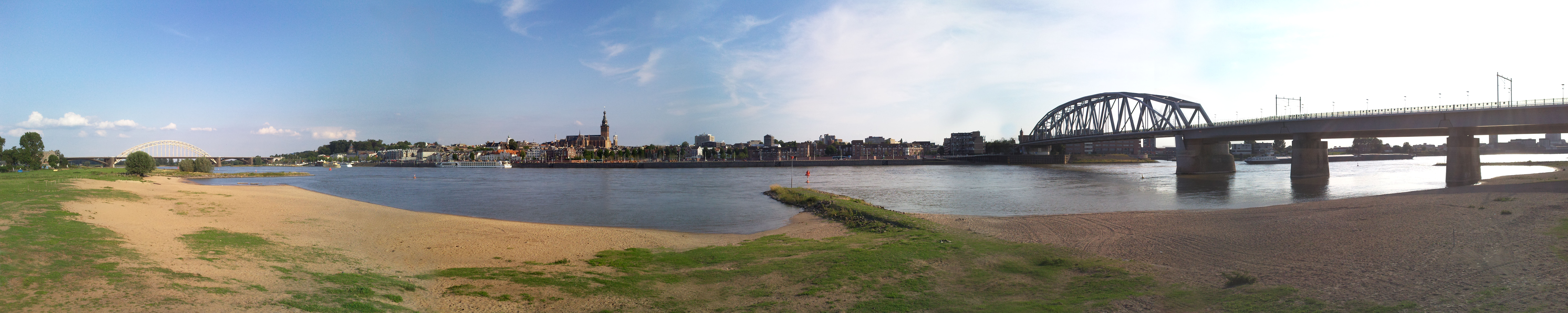
The Waalbrug, The Snelbinder and the Nijmegen railway bridge
