= Waal (river) =

River in the Netherlands

Coordinates: 51°53′30″N 5°31′15″E

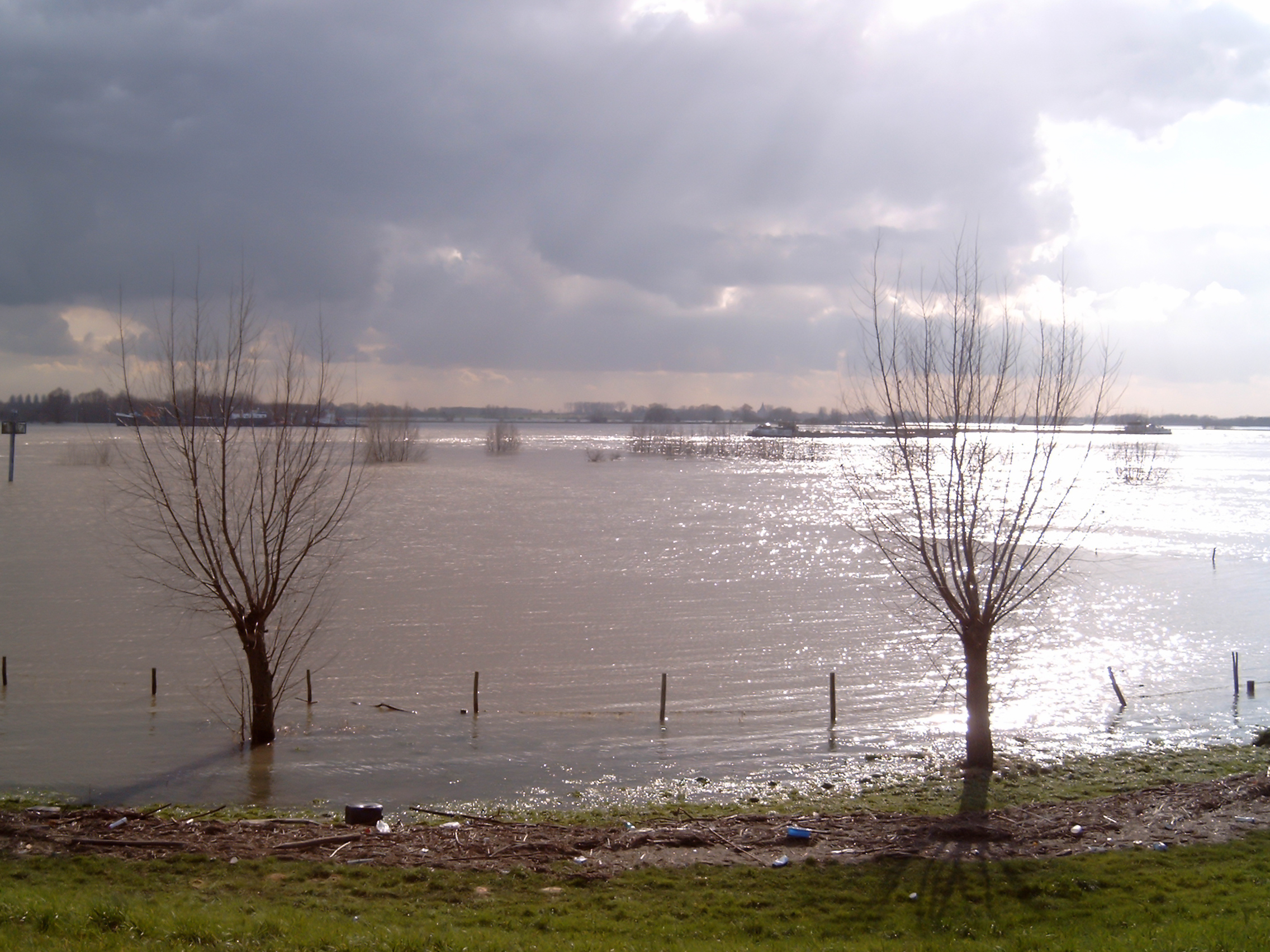

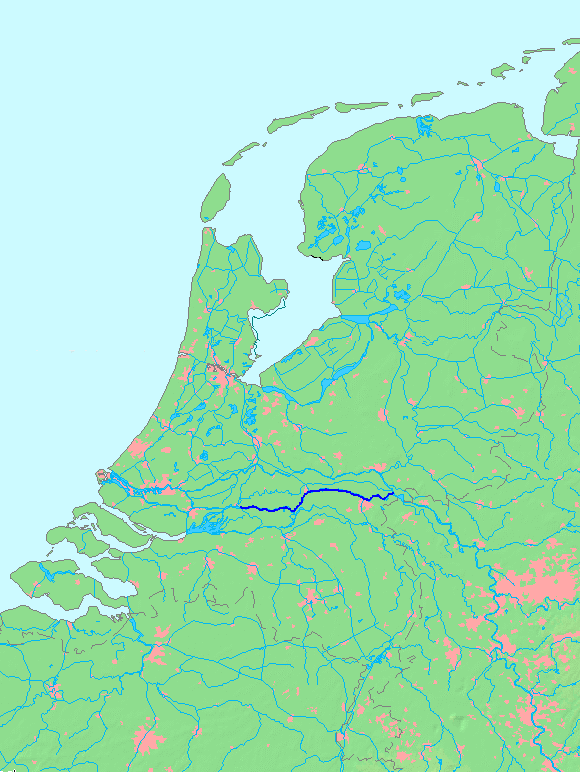
- Location of river Waal in dark blue.

Location
- Country: Netherlands
- State: Gelderland
- Region: Betuwe, Rijk van Nijmegen, Land van Maas en Waal, Land van Altena
- Cities: Nijmegen, Tiel, Zaltbommel, Gorinchem

Physical characteristics
- Source: Rhine
  - location: Millingen aan de Rijn, Gelderland, Netherlands
- Mouth: River Boven Merwede
  - location: Gorinchem, Gelderland/South Holland, Netherlands
- Length: 80 km (50 mi)
- Discharge
  - average: 1,500 m^{3}/s (53,000 cu ft/s)

Basin features
- Tributaries
  - right: Linge

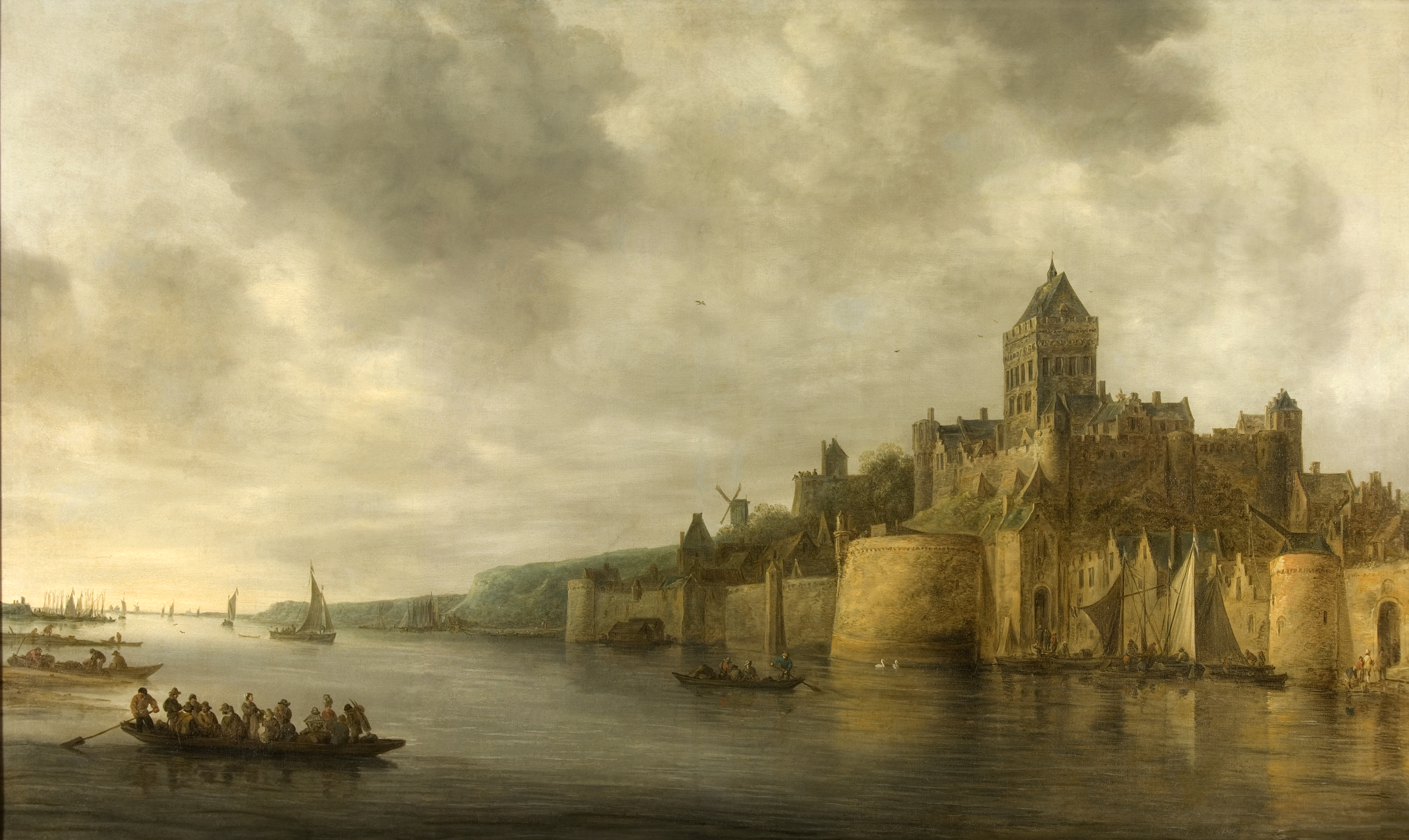
The Waal near Nijmegen, 1641

The Waal (Dutch name, pronounced [ʋaːl]) is the main distributary branch of the river Rhine flowing approximately 80 km (50 mi) through the Netherlands. It is the major waterway connecting the port of Rotterdam to Germany. Before it reaches Rotterdam, it joins with the Afgedamde Maas near Woudrichem to form the Boven Merwede. Along its length, Nijmegen, Tiel, Zaltbommel and Gorinchem are towns of importance with direct access to the river.

The river, which is the main channel in the Rhine–Meuse–Scheldt delta system, carries 65% of the total flow of the Rhine.

== History ==
The name Waal, in Roman times called Vacalis, Vahalis or Valis, later Vahal, is of Germanic origin and is named after the many meanders in the river (West Germanic languages: wôh, lit. 'crooked'). It is, in turn, thought to have inspired early Dutch settlers of the Hudson Valley region in New York to name the Wallkill River after it (Waalkil "Waal Creek").

The current river shows little signs of these great bends, since it has been the subject of numerous normalisation projects carried out between the 18th and 20th centuries to improve the river as an economically important shipping route. Some of the cut-off bends are still visible near the main river and are sometimes reconnected to it in times of high water levels.

=== Bend in South Holland ===
In the Middle Ages, the name "Waal" continued after the confluence with the Meuse. The delta parts now known as Boven Merwede, Beneden Merwede and the upper section of the Noord were also called Waal. Near Hendrik-Ido-Ambacht, the mainstream continued west until it flowed into Oude Maas near Heerjansdam. This last stretch past Hendrik-Ido-Ambacht, which separated the river islands of IJsselmonde and Zwijndrechtse Waard, is still called Waal, but is more commonly known as Waaltje (Dutch for Little Waal). It has been dammed off at both ends, making the Zwijndrechtse Waard part of IJsselmonde.

== River crossings ==
=== Road bridges ===
Showing nearest town:

- Waalbrug, Nijmegen.
- De Oversteek, Nijmegen.
- Tacitus Bridge, Ewijk.
- Prince Willem-Alexander Bridge, Beneden-Leeuwen.
- Martinus Nijhoff Bridge replaced the Bommel Bridge, Zaltbommel.

=== Rail bridges ===
Showing nearest station on the left and right bank:

- Nijmegen railway bridge, between Nijmegen and Lent.
- Dr. W. Hupkes Bridge, between Zaltbommel and Geldermalsen.

== Water quality ==
The Waal has significant adverse water quality due to discharge of raw sewage by France and Germany. A number of pathogens have been monitored to occur in the river waters from such sewage.
