= A50 motorway (Netherlands) =

Motorway in the Netherlands

Coordinates: 51°58′12″N 5°46′4″E

A50 motorway
- Rijksweg 50
- Motorways in the Netherlands with A50 and N50 bolt

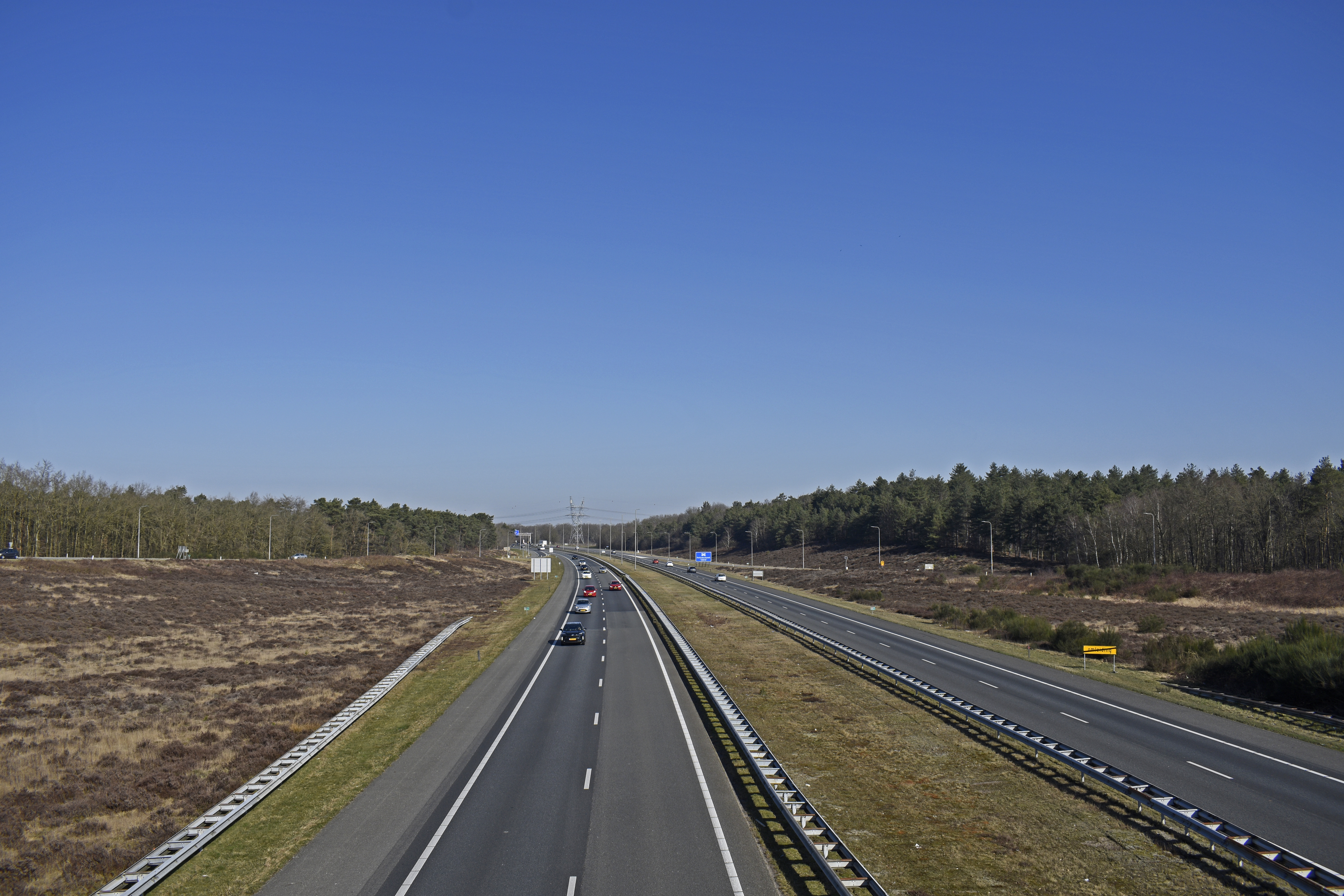

Route information
- Part of E31 / E35
- Maintained by Rijkswaterstaat

Major junctions
- South end: E25 / A 2 in Eindhoven
- A 59 near Oss; A 326 near Wijchen; E31 / A 73 / N 322 near Beuningen; E31 / A 15 near Elst; A 12 in Arnhem; E30 / A 1 in Apeldoorn

- North end: E232 / A 28 / N 50 in Hattem

Location
- Country: Kingdom of the Netherlands
- Constituent country: Netherlands
- Provinces: North Brabant, Gelderland

Highway system
- Roads in the Netherlands; Motorways; E-roads; Provincial; City routes
← A 44	→ A 58

A50, the section of Rijksweg 50 that is constructed as controlled-access highway, is a north–south motorway in the Netherlands, running from Eindhoven in the province of North Brabant, northwards passing by the cities of Oss, Nijmegen, Arnhem and Apeldoorn, to its northern terminus in the province of Gelderland near the city of Zwolle.

The highway is maintained by Rijkswaterstaat.

== Route description ==
It passes the cities of Eindhoven, Oss, Nijmegen, Arnhem, Apeldoorn and Zwolle.

== History ==
During the Second World War the Highway was known as Highway 69. Since 1969, it is known as N69 and has that name now only between the border of North Brabant and European route E34.

The highway was an important and only avenue of advance during Operation Market Garden, and after the fighting along its length between Allied and Wehrmacht forces it was named "Hell's Highway" so named because of the effective artillery fire directed at it by the German forces in the area. During the fighting some 16 kilometres (9.9 mi) of the highway south of Eindhoven was jammed with wrecks of vehicles being attacked by up to 200 Luftwaffe bombers requiring bulldozers and blade-equipped tanks to roam the length, pushing them off the surface to keep traffic moving. The wrecks on the soft shoulders of the highway prevented its use by other vehicles, in effect converting the highway into a narrow corridor, and slowing the movement on it to a crawl for the Allied drivers.

== Exit list ==
Province	Municipality	km	mi	Exit	Destinations	Notes	
North Brabant	Eindhoven	0.000	0.000	—	E25 / A 2 – Best, Eindhoven, Oirschot		
North Brabant	Eindhoven			6	Ekkersrijt		
North Brabant	Son en Beugel			7	John F. Kennedylaan		
North Brabant	Son en Beugel			8	N 620 west (Bestseweg) – Best, Son en Beugel		
North Brabant	Son en Beugel			Sonse Heide rest area Southbound exit and entrance			
North Brabant	Sint-Oedenrode			9	N 637 north (Noordelijke randweg) / Eversestraat / Veghelseweg – Sint-Oedenrode, Schijndel		
North Brabant	Veghel			10	N 622 west (Eerdsebaan / Bovenrooy) – Veghel, Schijndel		
Zuid-Willemsvaart				Julian J. Ewellbrug			
North Brabant	Veghel			11	N 279 (Rijksweg) – Veghel, Heeswijk-Dinther		
North Brabant	Veghel			12	Driehuizen / Udenseweg		
North Brabant	Uden			13	N 264 east (Lippstadt-singel) – Uden		
North Brabant	Uden			14	Rondweg / Looweg		
North Brabant	Bernheze			15	N 603 west (Noorderbaan) – Nistelrode, Heesch		
North Brabant	Bernheze			16	N 324 east (Rijksweg) / N 329 north (Graafsebaan) – Schaijk, Oss		
North Brabant	Oss			—	A 59 west – Heesch, Oss, 's-Hertogenbosch		
North Brabant	Oss			Ganzenven rest area southbound De Gagel rest area northbound			
North Brabant	Oss			17	N 277 south / N 626 west (Dorpenweg) / Erfsestraat – Ravenstein		
Meuse				Maasbrug Ravenstein			
Gelderland	Wijchen			—	A 326 east – Wijchen		
Gelderland	Beuningen			—	E31 east / A 73 east / N 322 west – Beuningen, Deest	Southern end of E 31 concurrency	
Waal				Tracitusbrug			
Gelderland	Overbetuwe			—	E31 west / A 15 – Andelst, Elst	Northern end of E 31 concurrency	
Gelderland	Overbetuwe			Weerbroek rest area southbound Meilanden rest area northbound			
Gelderland	Overbetuwe			18	N 837 (Cora Baltussenallee) – Heteren, Driel		
Nederrijn				Rijnbrug Heteren			
Gelderland	Renkum			19	N 225 (Rijksweg) – Renkum, Oosterbeek		
Gelderland	Arnhem			De Slenk rest area Northbound exit and entrance			
Gelderland					—	E35 / A 12 – Ede, Bennekom	Western end of A12 / E 35 concurrency
Gelderland					De Schaars rest area Westbound exit and entrance		
Gelderland					—	E35 / A 12 – Arnhem, Rozendaal	Eastern end of A12 / E 35 concurrency
Gelderland					20	N 784 (Apeldoornseweg) – Arnhem	
Gelderland					21	N 784 south / N 311 west – Arnhem	
Gelderland					North and southbound rest area Transit buses and vehicle breakdown only		
Gelderland	Apeldoorn			North and southbound rest area Transit buses and vehicle breakdown only			
Gelderland					North and southbound rest area Transit buses and vehicle breakdown only		
Gelderland					22	N 788 north (Arnhemseweg) – Beekbergen	
Gelderland					23	N 786 (Loenenseweg) – Beekbergen, Loenen	
Gelderland					De Brink rest area southbound De Somp rest area northbound		
Gelderland					—	E30 / A 1 – Apeldoorn, Voorst	
Gelderland					24	N 345 – Apeldoorn, Voorst	
Gelderland					25	Oost Veluweweg	
Gelderland	Epe			26	N 792 east (Geerstraat) / Eekterweg – Vaassen, Terwolde		
Gelderland	Epe			27	N 309 west – Epe		
Gelderland	Heerde			28	N 794 (Eperweg) – Epe, Heerde		
Gelderland	Heerde			Het Veen rest area southbound Kolthoorn rest area northbound			
Gelderland	Heerde			29	Kamperweg		
Gelderland	Hattem			30	Hessenweg / Keizersweg		
Gelderland	Hattem			—	N 50 north–west / E232 / A 28 – Kampen, Zwolle, Wezep		
1.000 mi = 1.609 km; 1.000 km = 0.621 mi: Concurrency terminus; HOV only; Incomplete access

== See also ==
- List of motorways in the Netherlands
- List of E-roads in the Netherlands
