= A15 motorway (Netherlands) =

Motorway in the Netherlands

A15 motorway
- Rijksweg 15
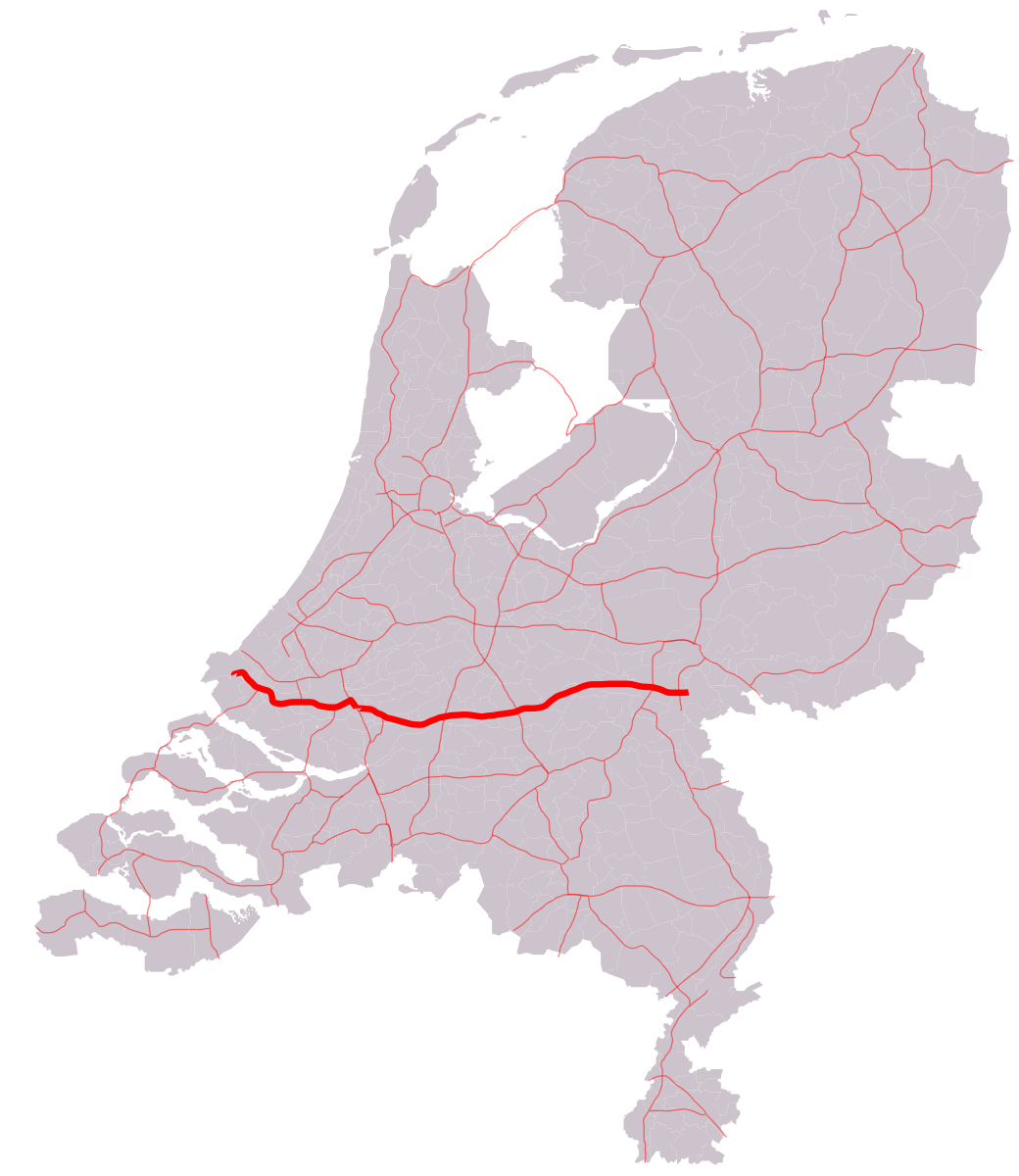
- Location of the A15 motorway

Location
- Country: Kingdom of the Netherlands
- Constituent country: Netherlands
- Provinces: South Holland, Utrecht, Gelderland

Highway system
- Roads in the Netherlands; Motorways; E-roads; Provincial; City routes

The Dutch A15 motorway (Rijksweg 15) is a motorway in the Netherlands, the A18 used to make part of it until may 2024.

== Connection between A15 and A18 ==
In governmental plans, the A15 and A18 together were meant to be one long motorway from the Europoort harbor near Rotterdam towards the town of Varsseveld in the east of the country. However, the section between the interchange Ressen at Lingewaard near Nijmegen and Zevenaar was not completed. To avoid confusion for drivers, the eastern part of the road has been given a different number: A18. In 2018, the Dutch government announced plans to extend the A15 by 12 kilometres (7.5 mi) from the A325 south of Arnhem to the A12 northwest of Zevenaar as a toll motorway, which will provide a connection onward to the A18; the A12 will also be widened from Westervoort to the Oud-Dijk interchange with the A18, and a new Zevenaar-East exit will be built to replace the existing Zevenaar exit. Construction of the extension began in 2019 and was planned for completion between 2021 and 2023. It is unclear whether the A18 route will be renumbered as the A15 once the connection to the A12 is made.

== Route ==
The westernmost part of the road, between the Maasvlakte and exit 8 is officially not an Autosnelweg (motorway), and is therefore known as the N15. However, it has most characteristics of a motorway, such as a central barrier and a hard shoulder until it crosses the Coloradoweg on the Maasvlakte. As of exit 8, the road becomes an official motorway, called A15. Together with the Betuweroute, which runs parallel on several stretches, the A15 is a main transport corridor from the Port of Rotterdam to the east.

=== Reconstruction works ===
In 2010, the A15 motorway near Rotterdam has been widened between the exit Brielle and the interchange Vaanplein. To the western part, between Brielle and Spijkenisse, one lane in each direction will be added, making it a 2x3 road. As for the eastern part of the section, between Spijkenisse and the Vaanplein, the current 2x3 road has been upgraded to a 2x5 road. The complex project in this highly industrialized part of Rotterdam caused an extensive loss of €103 million to one of the main contractors of the project, Ballast Nedam, in the year 2014.

== Exit list ==
Province	Municipality	km	mi	Exit	Name	Destinations	Notes
South Holland	Rotterdam			N15 crosses multiple intersections as local road from Maasvlakte			
South Holland	Westvoorne	26	16	8	Oostvoorne	N 218 south	East end of N15 designation
South Holland	Rotterdam	27	17	9	Havens 6200-7000	D'arcyweg / Markweg	
South Holland	Rotterdam	30	19	10	Engeland	Rijnweg / Elbeweg	Exit for Rotterdam Europoort
South Holland	Rotterdam	33	21	11	Havens 5500-5700	Merwedeweg / Europaweg	
South Holland	Brielle	36	22	12	Brielle	N 57 southwest / Saarweg	
South Holland	Rotterdam	37	23	13	Rozenburg	Droespolderweg / Merseyweg	
South Holland	Rotterdam	39	24	14	Rozenburg-Centrum	Trentweg	
South Holland	Rotterdam	43	27	15	Havens 4100-5200	Welplaatweg / Clydeweg	
South Holland	Nissewaard	45	28	16	Spijkenisse	N 218 south / Botlekweg / Oude Maasweg	
South Holland	Rotterdam	49	30	17	Hoogvliet	Gaderingviaduct / Hoefsmidstraat / Vondelingenweg / Aveling	
South Holland	Rotterdam	50	31	—	Interchange Benelux	A 4	
South Holland	Rotterdam	53	33	18	Pernis / Heijplaat	S 101	
South Holland	Rotterdam	54	34	19	Charlois	N 492 southwest / S 102	
South Holland	Rotterdam	60	37	19a	Interchange Vaanplein	A 29 south / S 103 northwest	
South Holland	Rotterdam	62	39	20	IJsselmonde	S 104 northwest	
South Holland	Ridderkerk	63	39	—	Interchange Ridderkerk-Noord	E19 / A 16 / A 38	West end of E 19 and A16 overlap
South Holland	Ridderkerk	69	43	—	Interchange Ridderkerk-Zuid	E19 / E31 / A 16	East end of E 19 and A16 overlap; west end of E 31 overlap
South Holland	Hendrik-Ido-Ambacht	72	45	21	Hendrik-Ido-Ambacht	N 915 east	
South Holland	Alblasserdam	76	47	22	Alblasserdam	N 915 west / Edisonweg	
South Holland	Papendrecht	78	48	23	Papendrecht	N 3 south / N 214 northeast	
South Holland	Sliedrecht	81	50	24	Sliedrecht-West	Parallelweg / Ouverture	
South Holland	Sliedrecht	86	53	25	Sliedrecht-Oost	Sportlaan / Peulenlaan / Buitendams	
South Holland	Hardinxveld-Giessendam	88	55	26	Hardinxveld-Giessendam	Nieuweweg	
South Holland	Gorinchem	95	59	27	Gorinchem	N 216 southwest / Banneweg	
South Holland	Gorinchem	96	60	—	Interchange Gorinchem	A 27	
South Holland	Molenlanden	100	62	28	Arkel	Spijksesteeg	
Utrecht (province)	Vijfheerenlanden	106	66	29	Leerdam	N 848	
Gelderland	West Betuwe	115	71	—	Interchange Deil	E25 / A 2	
Gelderland	West Betuwe	118	73	30a	Meteren	N 830 southwest / Rijksstraatweg	Eastbound exit and entrance only
Gelderland	West Betuwe	121	75	30	Geldermalsen	N 327 north / Blankertsestraat	
Gelderland	Tiel	124	77	31	Wadenoijen	Lingedijk	
Gelderland	Tiel	127	79	32	Tiel-West	N 834	
Gelderland	Tiel	131	81	33	Tiel	N 835 north / Westroijensestraat	
Gelderland	Neder-Betuwe	135	84	34	Echteld	N 323 south	
Gelderland	Neder-Betuwe	141	88	35	Ochten	N 233 north / Cuneraweg	
Gelderland	Neder-Betuwe	147	91	36	Dodewaard	Dodewaadsestraat	
Gelderland	Overbetuwe	151	94	37	Zetten	N 836 / Wanraaij	
Gelderland	Overbetuwe	154	96	—	Interchange Valburg	E31 / A 50	East end of E 31 overlap
Gelderland	Overbetuwe	160	99	38	Elst	Rijksweg Zuid / Griftdijk	
Gelderland	Lingewaard	162	101	—	Interchange Ressen	A 325 / N 325	
Gelderland	1.000 mi = 1.609 km; 1.000 km = 0.621 mi: Concurrency terminus; Incomplete access; Route transition						
