= A16 motorway (Netherlands) =

Freeway in the Netherlands

A16 motorway
- Rijksweg 16
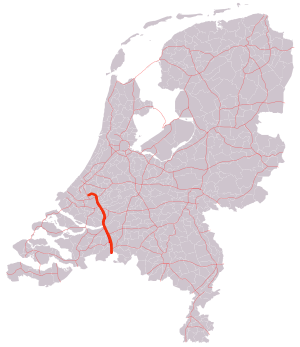
- Location of the A16 motorway

Major junctions
- North end: Interchange Zestienhoven
- South end: Hazeldonk

Location
- Country: Kingdom of the Netherlands
- Constituent country: Netherlands
- Provinces: South Holland, North Brabant

Highway system
- Roads in the Netherlands; Motorways; E-roads; Provincial; City routes

The A16 motorway is a motorway in the Netherlands. It runs from the Interchange Zestienhoven in the northwestern part of Rotterdam, towards the Belgian border near Hazeldonk. The motorway has 22 exits including 8 interchanges.

To relieve the southern part of A13 motorway from traffic, a major by-pass for the city of Rotterdam was constructed, extending the A16 was extended from its former terminus at interchange Terbregseplein towards a new interchange with the A13 between exits Berkel en Rodenrijs and Delft-Zuid. This extension was completed in October 2025.

== Speed limit ==
Nearly the entire A16 motorway, including both the local and express lanes near Rotterdam, featured a maximum speed of 100 km/h. The only exception to this were two short sections: between Dordrecht and Klaverpolder as well as the section between the intersection Princeville, west of Breda and the Belgian border, where a speed of 120 km/h is allowed. At the section between the Moerdijk bridges and the Belgian border the maximum speed changed to 130 km/h as of 2011.

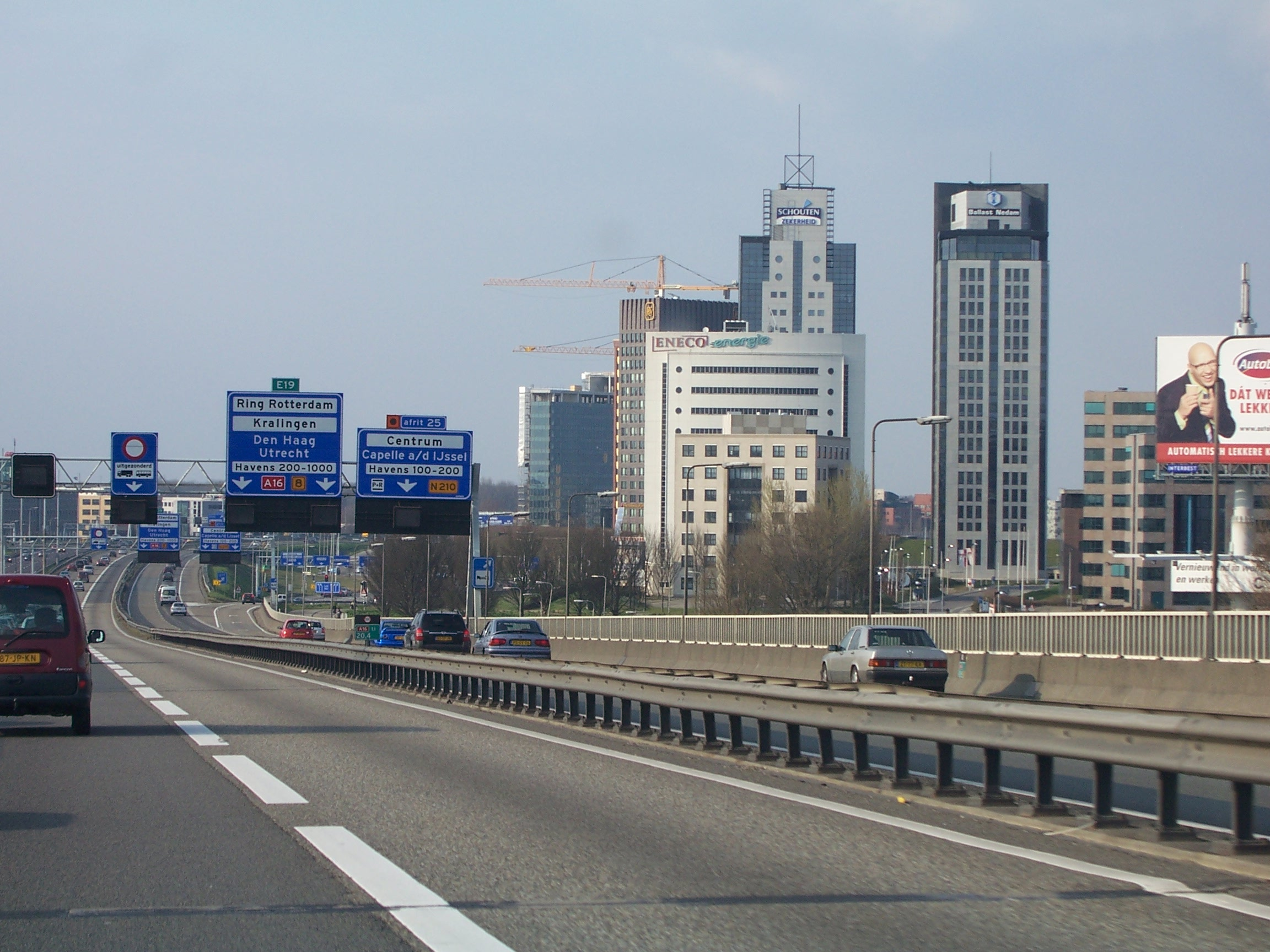
Northbound express (l) and local (r) lanes

== Local–express lanes near Rotterdam ==
Near Rotterdam, a system of collector–express lanes is used. The exits 24 through 26 are only accessible through the outer (collector) lanes. The inner lanes serve as express lanes and do not have any exits.

In the northern direction, there are three express lanes of which one lane is reserved for buses and trucks, while on the southbound express lanes three regular lanes are available, of which none is reserved for special vehicles.

== Shared road sections ==
On two sections of the road, other Dutch motorways run along the north–south motorway A16. Between interchanges Klaverpolder and Zonzeel, the east–west A59 motorway follows the route of the A16 for about 8 kilometers. Further south, between interchanges Princeville and Galder, the same goes for the (also east–west) A58 motorway, for a distance of about 6 kilometers.

Besides, European route E19 (Amsterdam–Paris) follows the complete route of the A16 motorway between the Terbregseplein in Rotterdam and the Belgian border near Breda.

== Exit list ==
Province	Municipality	km	mi	Exit	Name	Destinations	Notes
South Holland	Rotterdam	16	9.9	—	Interchange Zestienhoven	E19 / A 13	North end of E 19 overlap
South Holland	Rotterdam	6	3.7	30	Rotterdam Airport	S 114	Westbound entrance and eastbound exit only
South Holland	Rotterdam	10	6.2	29	Berkel en Rodenrijs	N 471	
South Holland	Rotterdam	12	7.5	28	Bergschenhoek	N 209	
South Holland	Rotterdam	16	9.9	27	Terbregge	S 110	Northbound entrance and southbound exit only
South Holland	Rotterdam	16	9.9	—	Interchange Terbregseplein	E25 / A 20	
South Holland	Rotterdam	17	11	27	Prins Alexander	S 109	Northbound exit and southbound entrance only
South Holland	Rotterdam	18	11	26	Kralingen	Jacques Dutilhweg	
South Holland	Rotterdam	19	12	25	Centrum	N 210 east (Abram van Rijckevorselweg) / Kralingseplein	
South Holland	Rotterdam	22	14	24	Feijenoord	S 106 west (John F Kennedylaan) / S 126 south (Adriaan Volkerlaan) / Van Hoochstratenweg / Arthurweg	
South Holland	Ridderkerk	23	14	—	Interchange Ridderkerk-Noord	A 15 / A 38	West end of A15 overlap
South Holland	Ridderkerk	27	17	—	Interchange Ridderkerk-Zuid	E31 / A 15	East end of A15 overlap
South Holland	Hendrik-Ido-Ambacht	30	19	23	Hendrik-Ido-Ambacht	Hendrik Ydenweg	
South Holland	Zwijndrecht	33	21	22	Zwijndrecht	Pieter Zeemanstraat / H.A. Lorentzstraat / Plantageweg	
South Holland	Dordrecht	35	22	21	Dordrecht-Centrum	Laan der Verenigde Naties / Mijlweg	
South Holland	Dordrecht	38	24	20	Randweg Dordrecht	N 3 northeast (Randweg) / N 217 west (Provincialeweg) / Laan van Europa	
North Brabant	Moerdijk	46	29	—	Interchange Klaverpolder	A 17 / A 59	North end of A59 overlap
North Brabant	Moerdijk	48	30	18	Zevenbergschen Hoek	Hoofdstraat	
North Brabant	Moerdijk	54	34	—	Interchange Zonzeel	A 59	South end of A59 overlap
North Brabant	Breda	59	37	17	Breda-Noord / Prinsenbeek	Backer en Ruebweg	
North Brabant	Breda	61	38	—	Interchange Princeville	E312 / A 58	North end of E 312 and A58 overlap. Including southbound exit 16
North Brabant	Breda	61.1	38.0	16	Breda-West	Ettensebaan / (Industrial area) Breda 5000 - 6000	Southbound exit and northbound entrance only
North Brabant	Breda	63	39	15	Breda / Rijsbergen	Graaf Engelbertlaan N 263 southwest	Northbound dual exit 15 & 16
North Brabant	Breda	67	42	—	Interchange Galder	E312 / A 58 east	South end of E 312 and A58 overlap
North Brabant	Breda	71	44	14	(Industrial area) Breda 6000 - 7000 / Transportzone Meer	Rietvelden, Hazeldonk	
North Brabant	Breda			—	Hazeldonk/Meer	E19 / A1 south	Border with Belgium; this road continues as the Belgian A1; south end of E 19 overlap
1.000 mi = 1.609 km; 1.000 km = 0.621 mi: Concurrency terminus; Incomplete access
