= European route E31 in the Netherlands =

European route E 31
- Europese weg E31
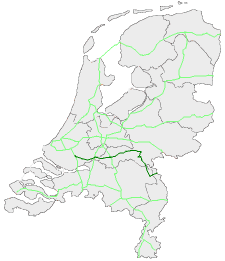
- European routes in the Netherlands with E 31 in dark green

Route information
- Maintained by Rijkswaterstaat

Major junctions
- West end: E19 / A 15 / A 16 in Ridderkerk
- E311 / A 27 in Gorinchem; E25 / A 2 near Geldermalsen; A 15 / A 50 near Valburg; A 50 / N 322 near Ewijk; A 73 near Rijkevoort
- East end: E31 / A 57 at Germany border

Location
- Country: Kingdom of the Netherlands
- Constituent country: Netherlands
- Provinces: South Holland, Gelderland, North Brabant, Limburg

Highway system
- International E-road network; A Class; B Class
← E30	→ E34

European route E 31 (E 31) is a north–south European route, running from Ridderkerk in the Netherlands to Hockenheim in Germany.

The highway is maintained by Rijkswaterstaat.

== Exit list ==
Province	Municipality	km	mi	Exit	Name	Destinations	Notes
South Holland	Ridderkerk	70.0	43.5	—	Ridderkerk Interchange	E19 / A 15 west / A 16 – Europoort, The Hague, Dordrecht, Breda	West end of A15 overlap
South Holland	Hendrik-Ido-Ambacht	71.5	44.4	21	Hendrik-Ido-Ambacht	N 915 east (Rotterdamseweg) – Hendrik-Ido-Ambacht, Ridderkerk	
South Holland	Hendrik-Ido-Ambacht	75.4	46.9	22	Alblasserdam	N 915 west (Grote Beer) / Edisonweg – Alblasserdam, Kinderdijk, Papendrecht-West	
South Holland	Papendrecht	77.9	48.4	23	Papendrecht	N 3 south / N 214 east – Papendrecht, Dordrecht, Oud-Alblas	
South Holland	Sliedrecht	80.3	49.9	24	Sliedrecht-West	Parallelweg / Ouverture	
South Holland	Sliedrecht	84.6	52.6	25	Sliedrecht-Oost	Rivierdijk / Peulenlaan / Buitendams	
South Holland	Hardinxveld-Giessendam	87.6	54.4	26	Hardinxveld-Giessendam	Nieuweweg	
South Holland	Gorinchem	94.7	58.8	27	Gorinchem	N 216 west / Banneweg – Gorinchem	
South Holland	Gorinchem	94.4	58.7	—	Gorinchem Interchange	E311 / A 27 – Utrecht, Breda	
South Holland	Giessenlanden	99.5	61.8	28	Arkel	Spijksesteeg	
Gelderland	Lingewaal	105.3	65.4	29	Leerdam	N 848 – Leerdam, Herwijnen, Vuren	
Gelderland	Geldermalsen	114.3	71.0	—	Deil Interchange	E25 / A 2 – Utrecht, 's-Hertogenbosch	
Gelderland	Geldermalsen	118.7	73.8	30a	Meteren	N 830 south (Steenweg Noord) / Rijksstraatweg – Meteren, Neerijnen	Eastbound exit and entrance only
Gelderland	Geldermalsen	121.1	75.2	30	Geldermalsen	N 327 north (Randweg) / Randweg – Geldermalsen, Est, Netherlands, Opijnen	
Gelderland	Tiel	123.8	76.9	31	Wadenoijen	Lingedijk	
Gelderland	Tiel	126.9	78.9	32	Tiel-West	N 834 – Tiel-West, Kerk-Avezaath, Buren	
Gelderland	Tiel	130.4	81.0	33	Tiel	N 835 north (Industrieweg) / Westroijensestraat – Tiel, Maurik	
Gelderland	Neder-Betuwe	134.3	83.5	34	Echteld	N 323 south (Prins Willem Alexanderweg) / Medelsestraat / Meersteeg – Echteld, Lienden, Beneden-Leeuwen, Druten	
Gelderland	Neder-Betuwe	141.0	87.6	35	Ochten	N 233 north (Cuneraweg) / Cuneraweg – Ochten, Kesteren, Rhenen	
Gelderland	Neder-Betuwe	145.5	90.4	36	Dodewaard	Dodewaardsestraat	
Gelderland	Overbetuwe	151.5	94.1	37	Andelst	N 836 (Wageningsestraat) / Wanraaij – Andelst, Zetten	
Gelderland	Overbetuwe	154.7– 154.9	96.1– 96.3	—	Valburg Interchange	A 15 east / A 50 north – Kleve, Arnhem, Oberhausen, Zwolle	East end of A15 overlap; north end of A50 overlap
Gelderland	Beuningen	148.0– 114.5	92.0– 71.1	—	Ewijk Interchange	A 50 south / N 322 west (Maas en Waalweg) – Eindhoven, 's-Hertogenbosch, Druten	South end of A50 overlap; north end of A73 overlap
Gelderland	Beuningen	112.4	69.8	1	Beuningen	N 847 south (Schoenaker) / Schoenaker – Beuningen, Wijchen	
Gelderland	Nijmegen	109.9	68.3	—	Neerbosch Interchange	Neerboscheweg	
Gelderland	Nijmegen	102.5	63.7	1a	Wijchen	N 326 / S 103 – Wijchen, Nijmegen-Lindenholt	
Gelderland	Nijmegen	99.5	61.8	2	Nijmegen-Dukenburg	S 104 east – Nijmegen-Dukenburg	
Gelderland	Heumen	95.0	59.0	3	Malden	N 271 east (Jan J. Ludenlaan) / N 846 west (Jan J. Ludenlaan) – Malden, Netherlands, Groesbeek, Mook en Middelaar, Heumen, Overasselt	
North Brabant	Cuijk	90.4	56.2	4	Cuijk	N 321 west / Beersebaan – Cuijk, Beers, North Brabant, Grave	
North Brabant	Cuijk	85.3	53.0	5	Haps	N 264 (Oeffeltseweg) – Haps, Mill, Netherlands, Oeffelt	
North Brabant	Boxmeer	81.8– 1.6	50.8– 0.99	—	Rijkevoort Interchange	A 73 south – Boxmeer, Venray, Venlo	South end of A73 overlap; west end of A77 overlap
North Brabant	Boxmeer	4.4	2.7	1	Boxmeer	N 621 (Beugenseweg) – Boxmeer, Beugen	
Limburg (Netherlands)	Gennep	7.6	4.7	2	Gennep	N 271 (Rijksweg) – Gennep, Heijen, Afferden, Limburg, Nieuw-Bergen	
Limburg (Netherlands)	Gennep	11.1	6.9	—	—	E31 / A 57 – Cologne, Goch, Moers	Continuation into Germany; east end of A77 overlap
1.000 mi = 1.609 km; 1.000 km = 0.621 mi: Concurrency terminus; Incomplete access

== See also ==
European route E31
Previous country: Terminus	Netherlands	Next country: Germany
