= A58 motorway (Netherlands) =

Freeway in the Netherlands

A58 motorway
- Rijksweg 58
- Motorways in the Netherlands with A58 bold

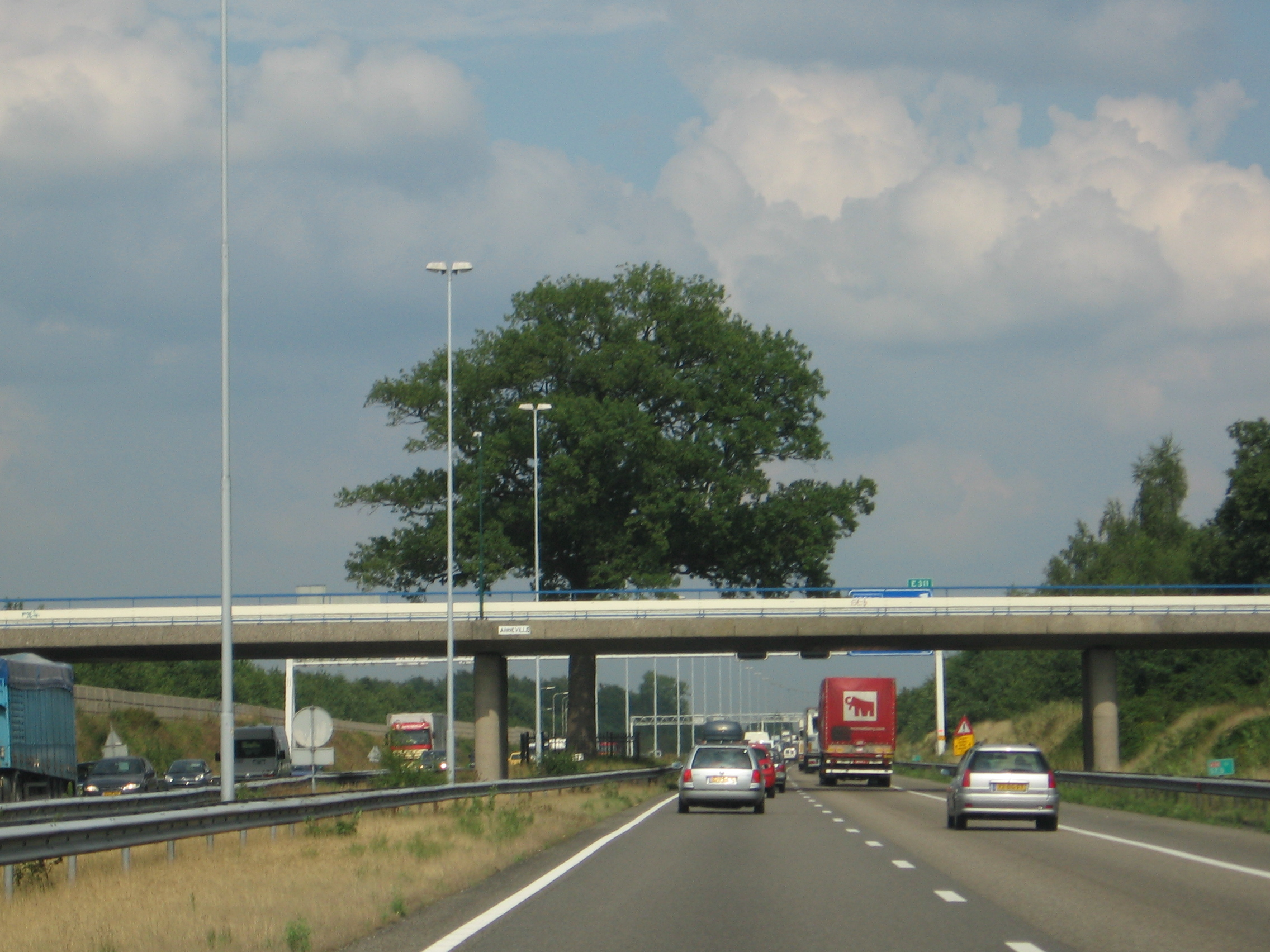
- A58 near Breda

Route information
- Part of E312
- Maintained by Rijkswaterstaat
- Length: 145 km (90 mi)

Major junctions
- East end: E312 / E25 / A 2 in Eindhoven

- A 65 in Tilburg; E311 / A 27 near Breda; E19 / A 16 near Breda; A 17 in Roosendaal; A 4 in Bergen op Zoom; A 4 near Woensdrecht; A 256 in Goes

- West end: E312 / N 58 / N 288 in Vlissingen

Location
- Country: Kingdom of the Netherlands
- Constituent country: Netherlands
- Provinces: North Brabant, Zeeland

Highway system
- Roads in the Netherlands; Motorways; E-roads; Provincial; City routes
← N 57	→ A 59

The A58 motorway is a motorway in the Netherlands. It is approximately 145 kilometres (90 miles) in length. The A58 is located in the Dutch provinces of North Brabant and Zeeland.

The A58 connects North Brabant's three major cities Eindhoven, Tilburg and Breda with the cities Goes, Middelburg and Vlissingen in Zeeland.

== History ==
With the reconstruction works of the Randweg Eindhoven, the beltway of the city, nearing completion, the A58 motorway has been shortened by a few kilometers. The road now only starts at the Batadorp interchange. The section between its former eastern terminus (interchange Ekkersrijt/John F. Kennedylaan) and the interchange Ekkersweijer has now become part of the A50, while the section between interchanges Ekkersweijer and Batadorp is now only a part of the A2, and no longer shared with the A58.

=== Traffic jams ===
The motorway 58 is congested everyday, especially between Oirschot - Tilburg and between Roosendaal - Bergen Op Zoom.

In 2011, experiments with "snelheidsdekens" (lower speed limits) of 90 km/h (55 mph) or even just 70 km/h (45 mph) were set to reduce the amount of traffic jams. It had a counterproductive effect: more traffic jams occurred in January–March 2011.

In 2011, the BZW (Brabant-Zealandic Employers association) got involved with the widening of the roads, while companies located near the motorway complain about the national government's "neglecting and pointing too much to the Randstad". The target is to widen the motorway in Brabant everywhere to at least 2x3 lanes, around Tilburg to 4x2 (with local- express-)lanes and relocate the section through Roosendaal.

== Route description ==
=== Speed limit ===
The speed limit on the eastern half is 120 km/h (75 mph), whereas on the shared section with the A16, and in Zeeland, the speed limit is 130 km/h (80 mph). See also the article on speed limits in the Netherlands.

=== Western terminus near Vlissingen ===
The A58 motorway section ends just east of the city of Vlissingen. From the intersection where the motorway ends, drivers can go straight ahead towards the N288 road, which brings them to the centre of the city or to a number of towns further to the west on the island.

=== European routes ===
Between interchange Batadorp, the future start of the A58, and the western end of the motorway near Vlissingen, the European route E312 follows the road. The shared section of the A58 and the A16 is also part of the European route E19.

== Exit list ==
Province	Municipality	km	mi	Exit	Destinations	Notes
North Brabant	Eindhoven	13	8.1			Eastern end of E 312 concurrency
North Brabant	Best	14	8.7	7		
North Brabant	Oirschot	20	12	8		
North Brabant	Oisterwijk	30	19	9		
North Brabant	Tilburg	34	21			
North Brabant	Hilvarenbeek	35	22	10		
North Brabant	Goirle	40	25	11		
North Brabant	Gilze en Rijen	47	29	12		
North Brabant	Breda	54	34	13		
North Brabant	Breda	56	35			
North Brabant	Breda	59	37	14		
North Brabant	Breda	62– 67	39– 42			southern end of A16 / E 19 concurrency
North Brabant	Breda	63	39	15+16		
North Brabant	Breda	62	39			
North Brabant	Breda			16		
North Brabant	Etten-Leur	76	47	18		
North Brabant	Etten-Leur	80	50	19		
North Brabant	Rucphen	83	52	20		
North Brabant	Rucphen	85	53	21		
North Brabant	Rucphen	88	55	22		
North Brabant	Roosendaal	90	56	23		
North Brabant	Roosendaal	92	57	24		
North Brabant	Roosendaal	94	58			
North Brabant	Roosendaal	98	61	25		
North Brabant	Roosendaal	101	63	26		
North Brabant	Bergen op Zoom	103	64	27		
North Brabant	Bergen op Zoom	104– 234	65– 145			Northern end of A4 concurrency
North Brabant	Bergen op Zoom	235	146	28		
North Brabant	Bergen op Zoom	236	147	29		
North Brabant	Woensdrecht	241	150	30		
North Brabant	Woensdrecht	243– 119	151– 74			Southern end of A4 concurrency
Zeeland	Reimerswaal	125	78	31		
Zeeland	Reimerswaal	134	83	32		
Zeeland	Reimerswaal	138	86	33		
Zeeland	Kapelle	142	88	34		
Zeeland	Borsele	145	90	35		
Zeeland	Goes	150	93			
Zeeland	Borsele	155	96	36		
Zeeland	Middelburg, Zeeland	164	102	37		
Zeeland	Middelburg, Zeeland	166	103	38		
Zeeland	Middelburg, Zeeland	168	104	39		
Zeeland	Vlissingen	170	110	40		
Zeeland	Vlissingen	171	106	—		Western end of E 312 concurrency
1.000 mi = 1.609 km; 1.000 km = 0.621 mi: Concurrency terminus
