= A13 motorway (Netherlands) =

Freeway in the Netherlands

A13 motorway
- Rijksweg 13
- Motorways in the Netherlands with A13 bolt

Route information
- Part of E19
- Maintained by Rijkswaterstaat
- Length: 17 km (11 mi)

Major junctions
- North end: E19 / E30 / A 4 in The Hague
- N 470 in Delft; S 114 in Rotterdam

- South end: E25 / A 20 / S 113 in Rotterdam

Location
- Country: Kingdom of the Netherlands
- Constituent country: Netherlands
- Provinces: South Holland

Highway system
- Roads in the Netherlands; Motorways; E-roads; Provincial; City routes
← A 12	→ N 14

The A13 motorway is a motorway in the Netherlands, connecting the cities of The Hague and Rotterdam. The Rotterdam The Hague Airport is located next to the A13.

== Route description ==
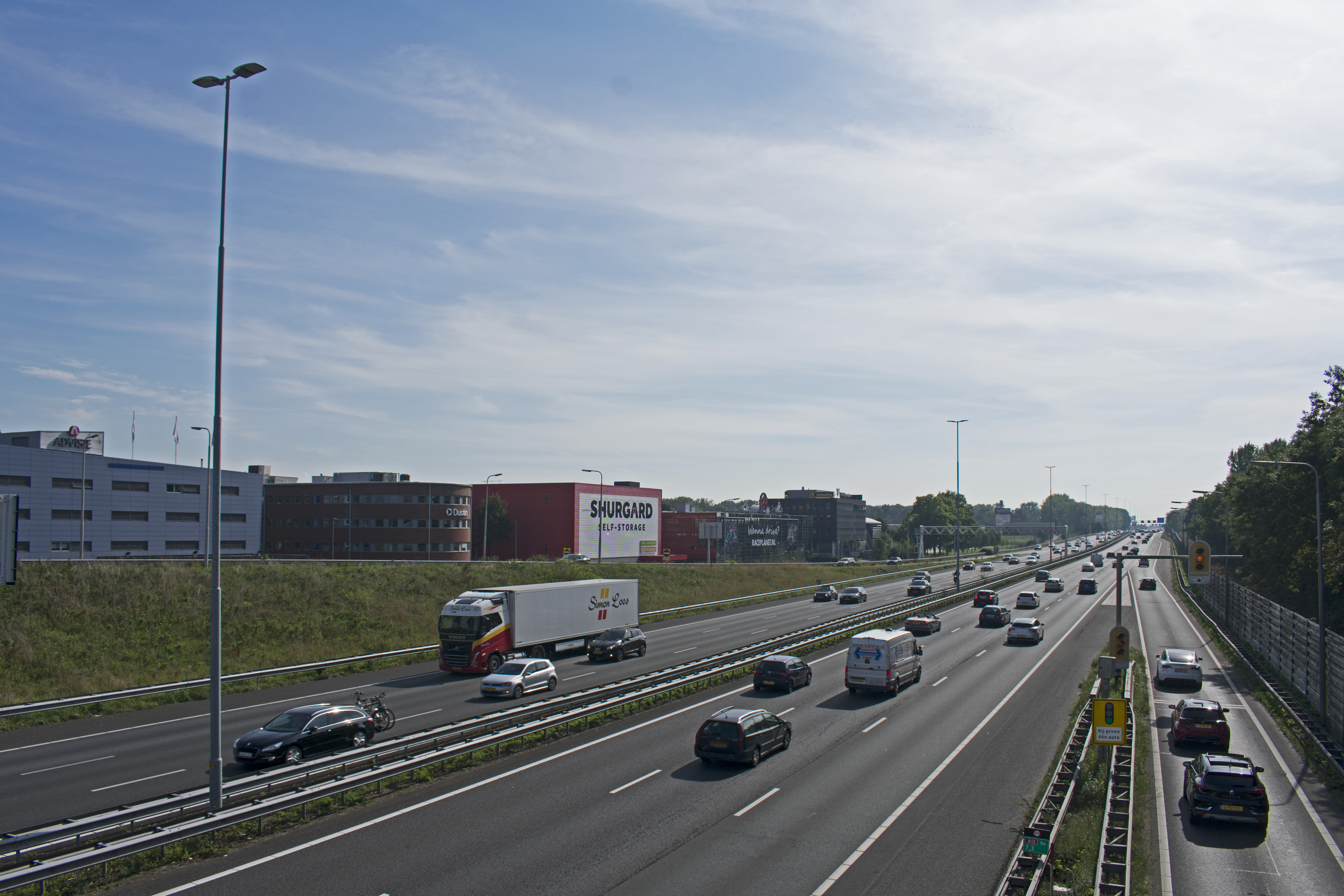
A13 in Delft (Exit Delft Noord).

The 17-kilometre-long (11 mi), highly congested motorway is the main motorway connection between these two cities. It is a dual carriageway with three lanes in each direction. Between the junctions Berkel and Delft-Zuid managed motorway is effective, when certain intensities occur the hard shoulder is opened for traffic heading north. The maximum speed on the road is 100 km/h.

European route E19, the route between Amsterdam and Paris, follows the complete A13 motorway between the interchanges Ypenburg and Kleinpolderplein.

To relieve the southern part of A13 motorway from traffic, a major by-pass for the city of Rotterdam was constructed, connecting the A13 directly with the A16 motorway. The A16 was extended from its former terminus at interchange Terbregseplein towards a new interchange with the A13 between exits Berkel en Rodenrijs and Delft-Zuid. This extension was completed in October 2025. The remaining part of the A13, between this interchange and interchange Ypenburg, would then have to be widened.

== Exit list ==
The entire route is in South Holland Province.

Municipality	km	mi	Exit	Destinations	Notes
The Hague				E19 east / E30 / A 4 – The Hague	Northern end of E 19 concurrency
Rijswijk	6	3.7	7	Laan van Delfvliet	Southbound entrance and northbound exit
Delft	7.5	4.7	8	Vrijenbanselaan / Kfar-Savaweg / Brasserskade	
Delft	9.6	6.0	9	Oostpoortweg	
Delft	11.6	7.2	10	N 470 / Kruithuisweg / Kruithuisplein – Delft, Pijnacker	
Lansingerland	16	9.9		E19 / A 16	Southern end of E 19 concurrency
Lansingerland	16.8	10.4	11	S 114 (Matlingeweg) – Overschie, Berkel en Rodenrijs	
Rotterdam			13	Parallelstraat-Oostzijde / Parallelstraat	Northbound entrance only
Rotterdam			13	Kleinpolderplein	Northbound entrance and southbound exit
Rotterdam	19.8	12.3			E25 east / A 20 / S 113 south (Stadhoudersweg) – Rotterdam, Schiedam
1.000 mi = 1.609 km; 1.000 km = 0.621 mi: Concurrency terminus; Incomplete access
