= Provincial road N786 (Netherlands) =

Road in the Netherlands

Provincial highway 786
- Provinciale weg 786
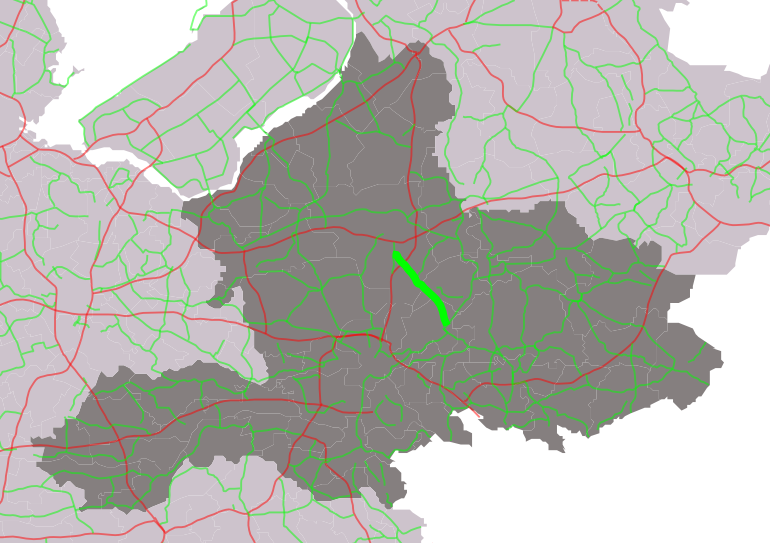

Route information
- Length: 15.5 km (9.6 mi)

Major junctions
- Northwest end: Beekbergen
- A 50 in Beekbergen

- Southeast end: N 348 in Dieren

Location
- Country: Kingdom of the Netherlands
- Constituent country: Netherlands
- Provinces: Gelderland
- Municipalities: Apeldoorn, Brummen, Rheden

Highway system
- Roads in the Netherlands; Motorways; E-roads; Provincial; City routes

Provincial road N786 runs between Beekbergen and Dieren in the Dutch province Gelderland. The road has a total length of 15.5 km (9.6 mi) and consists of a northern and a southern section, separated in Laag-Soeren by about 1.7 kilometres (1.1 mi). The N786 travels roughly along the boundary of the forested region Veluwe, and it is maintained by the province Gelderland.

== Route description ==
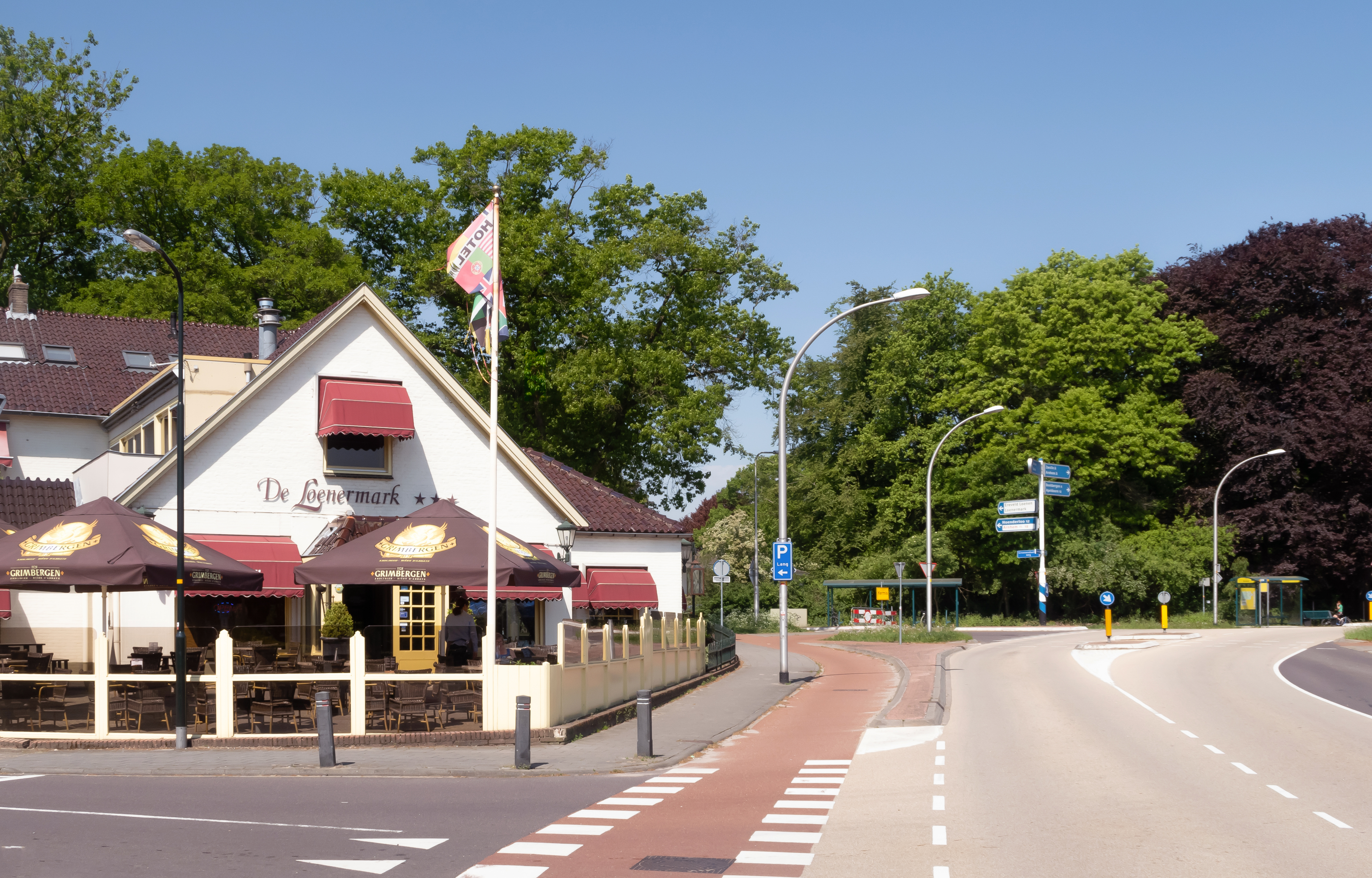
The N786 in Loenen, Apeldoorn

The N786 starts where the built-up area of Beekbergen ends and has "Loenenseweg" as street name. The road goes in a southeastern direction, reaching interchange Immenberg with the A50 motorway (no. 23) before being renamed "Beekbergerweg" when reaching the official boundaries of the village Loenen. In that village, the N786 changes its name to "Eerbeekseweg" and intersects Hoofdweg, which turns into provincial road N789 after leaving the built-up area of Loenen.

The next settlement that is reached is Eerbeek, where the provincial road is called "Harderwijkerweg". It runs along the boundary of the built-up area until the N786 ends at a junction with Den Texweg. The road does continue unnumbered for 1.7 kilometres (1.1 mi), traversing the village Laag-Soeren. When that road reaches the Apeldoorn Canal, the N786 continues with "Kanaalweg" as street name. The road runs parallel to that canal reaching the town Dieren, where the road ends at a junction with the N348 after crossing the Arnhem–Leeuwarden railway.

== History and future projects ==
Interchange Immenberg with the A50 motorway was opened in 1990. In past decades, changes have been made to the road in Loenen (2007) and parts between Loenen and Dieren (2012).

Between 2018 and 2020, the province intends to replace the level crossing with the Arnhem–Leeuwarden railway by a tunnel of the N786. Besides, the section of the N786 between Beekbergen and the interchange with the A50 motorway is planned to undergo large-scale maintenance in 2020. At the same time, the province plans to lower the speed limit at that segment from 80 km/h (50 mph) to 60 km/h (37 mph) to increase safety.

The province is also researching the possibility of altering the section south of the interchange with the A50. A cost–benefit analysis looking at five possibilities was finished in 2018.
