= A17 motorway (Netherlands) =

Freeway in the Netherlands

A17 motorway
- Rijksweg 17
- Location of the A17 motorway

Major junctions
- North-East end: interchange Klaverpolder
- South-West end: interchange De Stok

Location
- Country: Kingdom of the Netherlands
- Constituent country: Netherlands
- Provinces: North Brabant

Highway system
- Roads in the Netherlands; Motorways; E-roads; Provincial; City routes

The A17 motorway is a motorway in the Netherlands. It runs from the interchange Klaverpolder, just south of the Moerdijk bridge in the A16 motorway, towards the interchange De Stok with the A58 motorway, near Roosendaal.

== Overview ==
The A17 motorway is 25 kilometers long, and serves as an alternative route between the cities of Rotterdam and Antwerp, especially towards the latter's harbor, which is located in the western part of the city.

== Exit list ==
The entire route is in North Brabant Province.

Municipality	km	mi	Exit	Destinations	Notes
Moerdijk	0	0.0	—	E19 / A 16 / A 59 – Zevenbergsche Hoek, Dordrecht	East end of A59 overlap
Moerdijk	1	0.62	27	Binnenmoerdijksebaan	
Moerdijk	4	2.5	26	De Entree	
Moerdijk	7	4.3	25	N 285 (Provinciale Rondweg) / Vlietweg – Zevenbergen, Klundert	
Moerdijk	10	6.2	—	A 59 west – Fijnaart, Heijningen	West end of A59 overlap
Moerdijk	13	8.1	24	Markweg	
Halderberge	15	9.3	23	Sint Antoinedijk	
Halderberge	17	11	22	N 641 – Oudenbosch, Oud Gastel	
Roosendaal	19	12	21	N 268 north / Roosendaalsebaan – Oud Gastel	
Roosendaal	21	13	20	Stepvelden	
Roosendaal	24	15	19	Burgermeester Freijterslaan / Wouwbaan / De Stok	
Roosendaal	25	16	—	A 58 / E312 – Roosendaal, Wouw, Heerle, Bergen op Zoom	
1.000 mi = 1.609 km; 1.000 km = 0.621 mi: Concurrency terminus
