= European route E19 in the Netherlands =

European route E 19
- Europese weg E19
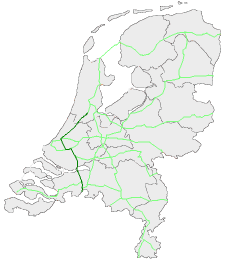
- European routes in the Netherlands with E 19 in dark green

Route information
- Maintained by Rijkswaterstaat

Major junctions
- North end: E35 / A 2 / A 10 / S 110 in Amsterdam

- E22 / A 10 in Amsterdam; A 9 in Badhoevedorp; A 44 near Leimuiden; E30 / A 12 in The Hague; E30 / A 4 in The Hague; E25 / A 20 / S 113 in Rotterdam; E25 / A 20 in Rotterdam; E31 / A 15 / A 38 in Ridderkerk; A 17 / A 59 north of Breda; E312 / A 58 in Breda
- South end: E19 / A1 at Belgium border

Location
- Country: Kingdom of the Netherlands
- Constituent country: Netherlands
- Provinces: North Holland, South Holland, North Brabant

Highway system
- International E-road network; A Class; B Class
→ E22

European route E 19 (E 19) is a north–south European route, running from Amsterdam in the Netherlands to Paris in France.

The highway is maintained by Rijkswaterstaat.

== Exit list ==
Province	Municipality	km	mi	Exit	Name	Destinations	Notes
North Holland	Amsterdam			—	Amstel Interchange	E35 east / A 10 east / E35 south / A 2 south / S 110 north (Nieuwe Utrechtseweg) – Amsterdam, Utrecht	East end of A10 overlap;
North Holland	Amsterdam			9	Amsterdam-Buitenveldert / Amsterdam-Rivierenbuurt	S 109 (Europaboulevard)	
North Holland	Amsterdam			8	Amsterdam-Oud Zuid	S 108 (Amstelveenseweg)	
North Holland	Amsterdam			—	De Nieuwe Meer Interchange	E22 north / A 10 north – Amsterdam, Zaanstad, Leeuwarden	West end of A10 overlap; north end of A4 overlap
North Holland	Amsterdam			1	Amsterdam-Sloten	Anderlechtlaan	
North Holland	Haarlemmermeer			—	Badhoevedorp Interchange	A 9 – Utrecht, Haarlem	
North Holland	Haarlemmermeer			2	Schiphol	Amsterdam Schiphol Airport	
North Holland	Haarlemmermeer			—	De Hoek Interchange	A 5 north – Zaanstad, Haarlem	Missing northbound entrance
North Holland	Haarlemmermeer			3	Hoofddorp	N 201 (Hoofddorpdreef / Rozenburgdreef) – Hoofddorp, Aalsmeer	
North Holland	Haarlemmermeer			3a	Hoofddorp-Zuid	Nelson Mandeladreef	
North Holland	Haarlemmermeer			4	Nieuw-Vennep	N 207 (Leimuiderweg) – Nieuw-Vennep, Alphen a/d Rijn	
North Holland	Haarlemmermeer			—	Burgerveen Interchange	A 44 west – The Hague Center, Leiden, Sassenheim	Northbound entrance and southbound exit only
South Holland	Kaag en Braassem			5	Roelofarendsveen	To N 445 – Roelofarendsveen	
South Holland	Leiderdorp			6	Hoogmade	N 446 east (Doespolderweg) – Hoogmade, Leiderdorp	
South Holland	Leiden			6a	Zoeterwoude-Rijndijk	N 11 east / Willem van der Madeweg – Zoeterwoude-Rijndijk, Alphen a/d Rijn, Utrecht	
South Holland	Leiden			7	Zoeterwoude-Dorp	N 206 (Europaweg / Burgemeester Detmersweg) – Zoeterwoude-Dorp, Leiden, Voorschoten	
South Holland	Leidschendam-Voorburg			—	Hofvliet Interchange	N 434 west – Katwijk aan Zee, Wassenaar	
South Holland	The Hague			8	Leidschendam	N 14 north (Noordelijke Randweg) / Zoetermeerse Rijweg – Leidschendam, Voorburg, Leidschenveen-Ypenburg	
South Holland	The Hague			—	Prins Clausplein Interchange	A 12 / E30 east – Utrecht, Zoetermeer, The Hague	
South Holland	The Hague			—	Ypenburg Interchange	A 4 south / E30 south – Rijswijk, Hook of Holland	South end of A4 overlap; north end of A13 overlap
South Holland	The Hague			7	Rijswijk	Laan van Delfvliet	Southbound entrance and northbound exit only
South Holland	Delft			8	Delft-Noord	Vrijenbanselaan / Brasserskade	
South Holland	Delft			9	Delft	Oostpoortweg	
South Holland	Delft			10	Delft-Zuid	N 470 (Kruithuisweg) – Delft, Pijnacker	
South Holland	Rotterdam			11	Berkel en Rodenrijs	N 209 east (Doenkade) / S 114 south (Doenbrug) – Overschie, Berkel en Rodenrijs	
South Holland	Rotterdam			—	—	Parallelstraat-Oostzijde	Northbound entrance only
South Holland	Rotterdam			—	Kleinpolderplein Interchange	E25 west / A 20 west / S 113 south (Stadhoudersweg) – Europoort, Hook of Holland, Noord (Rotterdam)	South end of A13 overlap; west end of A20 overlap; west end of E 25 overlap
South Holland	Rotterdam			13	Overschie	S 113 south (Stadhoudersweg) / Kleinpolderplein – Overschie, Blijdorp	
South Holland	Rotterdam			14	Rotterdam	N 471 north (G.K. van Hogendorpweg) / S 112 (Schieweg / Schieplein) – Rotterdam Centrum	
South Holland	Rotterdam			15	Crooswijk	S 111 (Boezemlaan) / Gordelweg / Soetendaalsekade – Crooswijk	Westbound entrance and eastbound exit only
South Holland	Rotterdam			—	Terbregseplein Interchange	E25 east / A 20 east – Gouda, South Holland, Utrecht	East end of A20 overlap; east end of E 25 overlap; north end of A16 overlap
South Holland	Rotterdam			27	Prins Alexander	S 109 (Hoofdweg) – Prins Alexander, Hillegersberg-Schiebroek	Southbound entrance only
South Holland	Rotterdam			26	Kralingen	S 108 west – Kralingen	
South Holland	Rotterdam			25	Capelle a/d IJssel	S 107 west / N 210 east – Capelle a/d IJssel, Rotterdam Centrum	
South Holland	Rotterdam			24	Feijenoord	S 106 west (Stadionweg) / S 226 south (Adriaan Volkerlaan) – Feijenoord, IJsselmonde	
South Holland	Ridderkerk			—	Ridderkerk Interchange	A 15 west / A 38 east – Ridderkerk, Europoort	North end of A15 overlap
South Holland	Ridderkerk			—	Ridderkerk Interchange	E31 east / A 15 east – Gorinchem, Nijmegen	South end of A15 overlap
South Holland	Hendrik-Ido-Ambacht			23	Hendrik-Ido-Ambacht	Hendrik Ydenweg	
South Holland	Zwijndrecht, Netherlands			22	Zwijndrecht, Netherlands	Plantageweg / Pieter Zeemanstraat / H.A. Lorentzstraat	
South Holland	Dordrecht			21	Dordrecht-Centrum	Laan der Verenigde Staten / Mijlweg	
South Holland	Dordrecht			20	's-Gravendeel	N 3 east (Randweg) / N 217 west – 's-Gravendeel, Oud-Beijerland, Papendrecht	
North Brabant	Moerdijk			—	Klaverpolder Interchange	A 17 west / A 59 west – Roosendaal, Bergen op Zoom	North end of A59 overlap
North Brabant	Moerdijk			18	Zevenbergschen-Hoek	Hoofdstraat	
North Brabant	Moerdijk			—	Zonzeel Interchange	A 59 east – Utrecht, Waalwijk, 's-Hertogenbosch	South end of A59 overlap
North Brabant	Breda			17	Breda-Noord	Backer en Ruebweg	
North Brabant	Breda			16	Breda-West	Ettensebaan	Northbound entrance and soutbhound exit only
North Brabant	Breda			—	Princeville Interchange	E312 west / A 58 west – Etten-Leur, Roosendaal	North end of A58 overlap; north end of E 312 overlap
North Brabant	Breda			15	Breda	N 263 (Graaf Engelbertlaan) – Breda, Rijsbergen	
North Brabant	Breda			—	Galder Interchange	E312 east / A 58 east to A 27 north – Breda-Oost, Utrecht, Tilburg	South end of A58 overlap; south end of E 312 overlap
North Brabant	Breda			14	Industrie Hazeldonk 6000-7000	Rietvelden / Hazeldonk	Northbound entrance and southbound exit only
North Brabant	Breda			—	—	E19 south / A1 south – Antwerp	Continuation into Belgium; south end of A16 overlap
1.000 mi = 1.609 km; 1.000 km = 0.621 mi: Concurrency terminus; Incomplete access; Unopened

== See also ==
European route E19
Previous country: Terminus	Netherlands	Next country: Belgium
