= A74 motorway (Netherlands) =

Road in the Netherlands

A74 motorway
- Rijksweg 74
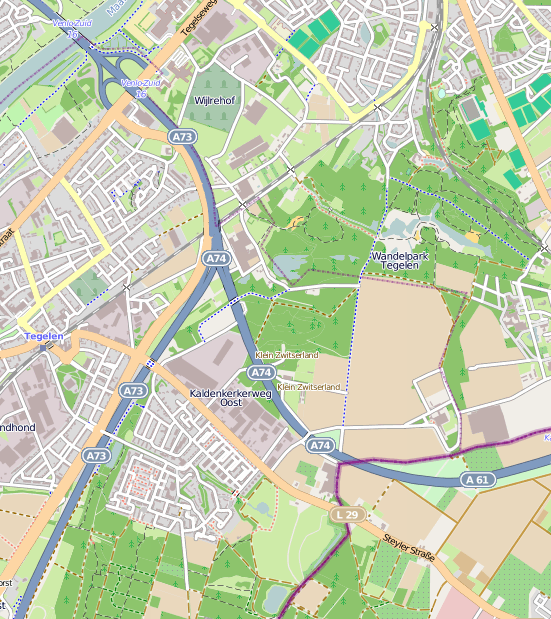
- Location of the A74 motorway

Route information
- Maintained by Rijkswaterstaat
- Length: 1.893 km (1.176 mi)
- Existed: 4 April 2012 –present

Major junctions
- North end: A73 in Venlo
- South end: Tegelen; A 61 border with Germany

Location
- Country: Kingdom of the Netherlands
- Constituent country: Netherlands
- Provinces: Limburg

Highway system
- Roads in the Netherlands; Motorways; E-roads; Provincial; City routes

The A74 motorway is a short motorway in the Netherlands. It connects the A73 in Venlo to the German border, where it becomes the German A 61. This makes it an important link for international traffic from around Venlo to Germany. The A74 is 1.893 kilometers in length.

== Exit list ==
The entire route is in Venlo, Limburg Province.

km	mi	Exit	Name	Destinations	Notes
99.8	62.0	—		A 61 east	Border with Germany; this road continues as the German A 61
101.4	63.0	—	Interchange Tiglia	A 73	A73 can only be entered northward
1.000 mi = 1.609 km; 1.000 km = 0.621 mi: Incomplete access
