= A38 =

A38 or A-38 may refer to:

- A38 (ship), a party boat on the Danube in Budapest, Hungary
- A38 motorway (Netherlands)
- A38 road (England)
  - A38(M) motorway
- A38 (Sydney), an arterial route in Sydney, Australia
- Bundesautobahn 38, an autobahn in Germany
- English Opening, Encyclopaedia of Chess Openings code
- Aero A.38, a Czech airliner of the 1930s
- Iceberg A-38
- Valiant tank, a WWII-era prototype British tank
- XA-38 Grizzly, a prototype American attack aircraft of the 1940s
- A38, a fictional permit number in The Twelve Tasks of Asterix
