= Provincial road N434 (Netherlands) =

Highway in the Netherlands

Provincial road N434 is a provincial road in the Dutch province of South Holland. It provides a direct connection between the A4 and A44 motorways, south of Leiden, forming part of the RijnlandRoute which aims to improve traffic flow around Leiden. The N434 is the first section of this project to be constructed, with construction costs estimated at €812 million in 2014. The project experienced some delays, including a fire in 2022 in the nearby storage site which resulted in extensive material damage.

The N434 connects to the A44 through the newly constructed Ommedijk intersection, near Wassenaar. The road is sunk into the ground to reduce noise pollution to nearby residents, passing under the Veenwatering Aquaduct, before entering the roughly 2.3 km Corbulotunnel, located under the town of Voorschoten. On the other end, it connects to the A4 through the new Hofvliet intersection near the recreational area of Vlietland. It consists of a 2x2 motorway road layout.

== Exit list ==
The entire route is in South Holland Province.

Municipality	km	mi	Exit	Name	Destinations	Notes
Wassenaar			—	Ommedijk interchange	A 44 – Wassenaar, Katwijk aan Zee, Leiden	
Leidschendam-Voorburg			—	Hofvliet Interchange	E19 / A 4 – Zoetermeer, Leiden	
1.000 mi = 1.609 km; 1.000 km = 0.621 mi: Unopened
