= A65 motorway (Netherlands) =

Freeway in the Netherlands

A65 motorway
- Rijksweg 65
- Location of the A65 motorway

Major junctions
- North end: A2 in Vught
- South end: A58 in Tilburg

Location
- Country: Kingdom of the Netherlands
- Constituent country: Netherlands
- Provinces: North Brabant

Highway system
- Roads in the Netherlands; Motorways; E-roads; Provincial; City routes

The A65/N65 is a motorway and an expressway in the Netherlands. It is located in the province of North Brabant, and connects the cities of Vught and Tilburg.

== Route ==
The road begins as the A65 at the Vught interchange with the A2 and then goes to the Vught city center, at which point it becomes the N65. On the path of the N65 lie seven at-grade intersections with traffic lights, of which three are in Vught. At the Berkel-Enschot exit, the N65 once again becomes the A65. The A65 then has one more exit before it ends at the A58 at the De Baars interchange. For its entire route, the A65/N65 has four lanes, with two lanes on each side.
