= A20 motorway (Netherlands) =

Freeway in the Netherlands

A20 motorway
- Rijksweg 20
- Location of the A20 motorway

Major junctions
- West end: Naaldwijk
- East end: Interchange Gouwe

Location
- Country: Kingdom of the Netherlands
- Constituent country: Netherlands
- Provinces: South Holland

Highway system
- Roads in the Netherlands; Motorways; E-roads; Provincial; City routes

The A20 motorway is a motorway in the Netherlands. It is approximately 39 kilometers (25 miles) in length.

The A20 is entirely located in the Dutch province South Holland and connects the N213 road from the Westland municipality with the cities of Rotterdam and Gouda, where it connects to the A12 motorway at the interchange Gouwe.

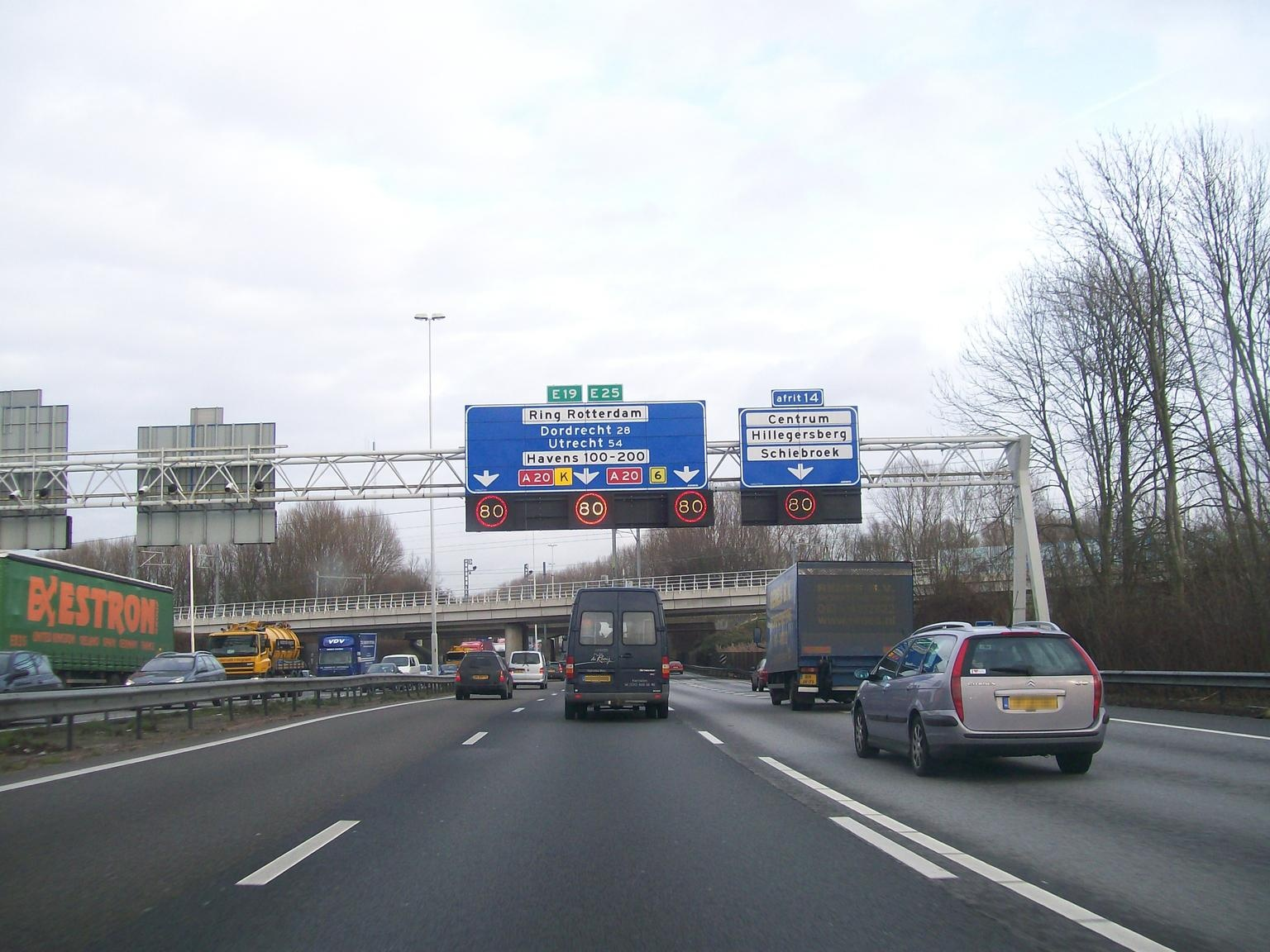
The 80 km/h (50 mph) zone near Rotterdam.

== Rotterdam ==
The section near Rotterdam, between the interchanges with the A4 and A16 motorways, is the northern part of the so-called Ring Rotterdam, the beltway around the city.

On a part of this section, the maximum speed is reduced to 80 km/h (50 mph), which is being enforced by speed cameras calculating the average speed of a vehicle on the stretch between the cameras.

== European routes ==
From the first exit, exit 6 (Maasdijk), the European route E25 follows the A20 motorway all the way to its terminus at interchange Gouwe.

Besides, the European route E19 follows the A20 along the 6 kilometers (4 miles) short stretch between interchanges Kleinpolderplein and Terbregseplein, just north of Rotterdam.

== Exit list ==
The entire route is in South Holland.

Municipality	km	mi	Exit	Destinations	Notes
Westland	10	6.2		N 223 / E25 / E30 – Naaldwijk	Continues as road N213 to Westland; West end of E 25 overlap
Westland	12	7.5	6	– Maasdijk	
Maassluis	17	11	7	Maassluis	
Vlaardingen	21	13	8	Vlaardingen-West	
Vlaardingen	22	14	9	Vlaardingen	
Schiedam	23	14		A 4 (Interchange Kethelplein)	
Schiedam	24	15	10	Schiedam-Noord	Noord means north
Schiedam	26	16	11	Schiedam	
Rotterdam	27	17	12	Spaanse Polder	
Rotterdam	29	18	13	A 13 (Interchange Kleinpolderplein) – Overschie	
Rotterdam	31	19	14	Centrum	Centrum means center
Rotterdam	32	20	15	Crooswijk	Eastbound exit and westbound entrance only
Rotterdam	35	22		A 16 (Interchange Terbregseplein) / E19	
Rotterdam	38	24	16	Prins Alexander	
Nieuwerkerk aan den IJssel	43	27	17	N 219 – Nieuwerkerk aan den IJssel	
Moordrecht	46	29	18	Moordrecht	
Gouda	49	30		A 12 (Interchange Gouwe) / E25 / E30	Exit from westbound A12 and entry to eastbound A12 only; East end of E 25 overlap
1.000 mi = 1.609 km; 1.000 km = 0.621 mi: Concurrency terminus; Incomplete access
