= S110 (Amsterdam) =

City route in Amsterdam, the Netherlands

City route 110
- Stadsroute 110

Major junctions
- South end: E35 / E19 / A 10 / A 2 – Amsterdam
- North end: S 100 – Amsterdam

Location
- Country: Kingdom of the Netherlands
- Constituent country: Netherlands
- Provinces: North Holland
- Municipalities: Amsterdam

Highway system
- Roads in the Netherlands; Motorways; E-roads; Provincial; City routes

S110 is a Dutch city route in Amsterdam. It consists of the Amsteldijk street from Toronto Bridge over the Amstel, running south following the west bank of the Amstel in De Pijp. Past Berlagebrug the route follows President Kennedylaan avenue and Nieuwe Utrechtseweg road and connects to the A2 motorway to Utrecht.
