= Provincial road N325 (Netherlands) =

Highway in the Netherlands

Provincial highway 325
- Provinciale weg 325
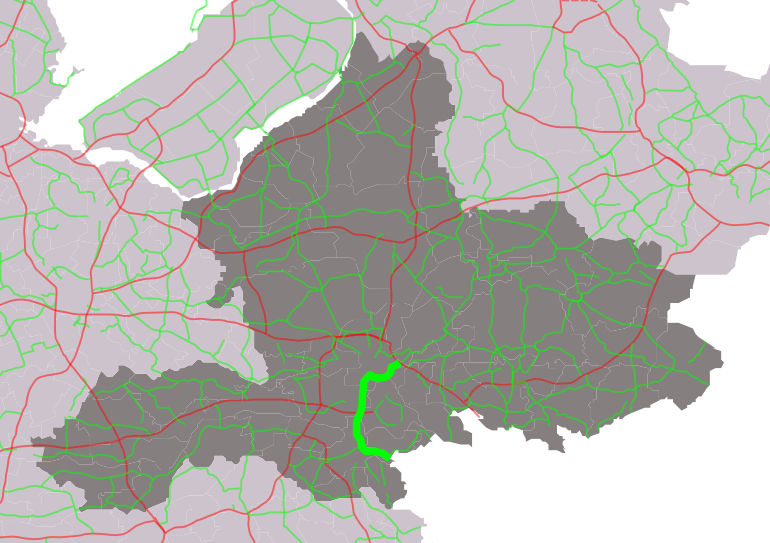

Route information
- Length: 28 km (17 mi)

Major junctions
- West end: A 325 / N 225 – Arnhem

- East end: E35 / A 12 / A 348 – Arnhem

Location
- Country: Kingdom of the Netherlands
- Constituent country: Netherlands
- Provinces: Gelderland

Highway system
- Roads in the Netherlands; Motorways; E-roads; Provincial; City routes

Provincial road N325 is a Dutch provincial road. The road runs from Arnhem, through Nijmegen, to the nearby German border. The N325 was previously named Rijksweg 52, which was constructed during World War II. When responsibility for the road was transferred from the Dutch state to the province of Gelderland in 1993 it was renamed A325/N325.

== Intersection Velperbroek - Nijmeegseplein ==
The section of the road between Intersection Velperbroek (A12) and the Nijmeegseplein is also known as the 'Pleyroute'. The Pleyroute bypasses Arnhem's city center. Notably, this route travels over the Andrej Sacharov bridge (opened in 1987) across the Nederrijn river, connecting the northern and southern parts of Arnhem. On the Andrej Sacharov bridge traffic runs in two lanes in both directions, and unusually the road here has no hard shoulder. North of the Nederrijn, a bicycle path travels alongside the N325. The speed limit on the Pleyroute is 80 km/h due to environmental and noise concerns. The Pleyroute has redirected traffic flow from the two previously existing bridges in Arnhem, the John Frostbrug and the Nelson Mandelabrug, easing congestion in the city.

== Nijmeegseplein - Intersection Ressen ==
Between the Nijmeegseplein and Intersection Ressen is the A325 motorway, which has a 100 km/h speed limit between 0600h-1900h. At other times the speed limit is increased to 120 km/h.

== Intersection Ressen - Keizer Traianusplein ==
Between intersection Ressen and the Keizer Traianusplein the road is again called N325. This part of the road is owned by the local authorities of Nijmegen. Since this section of the N325 runs within the city of Nijmegen, the speed limit is restricted to 50 km/h.

== Keizer Traianusplein - German Border ==
After the Keizer Traianusplein the road continues to the Dutch-German border, with a constant speed limit of 80 km/h. On the German side of the border the road continues onwards as Bundersstraße 9.

== See also ==
- 8
