= Speed limits in the Netherlands =

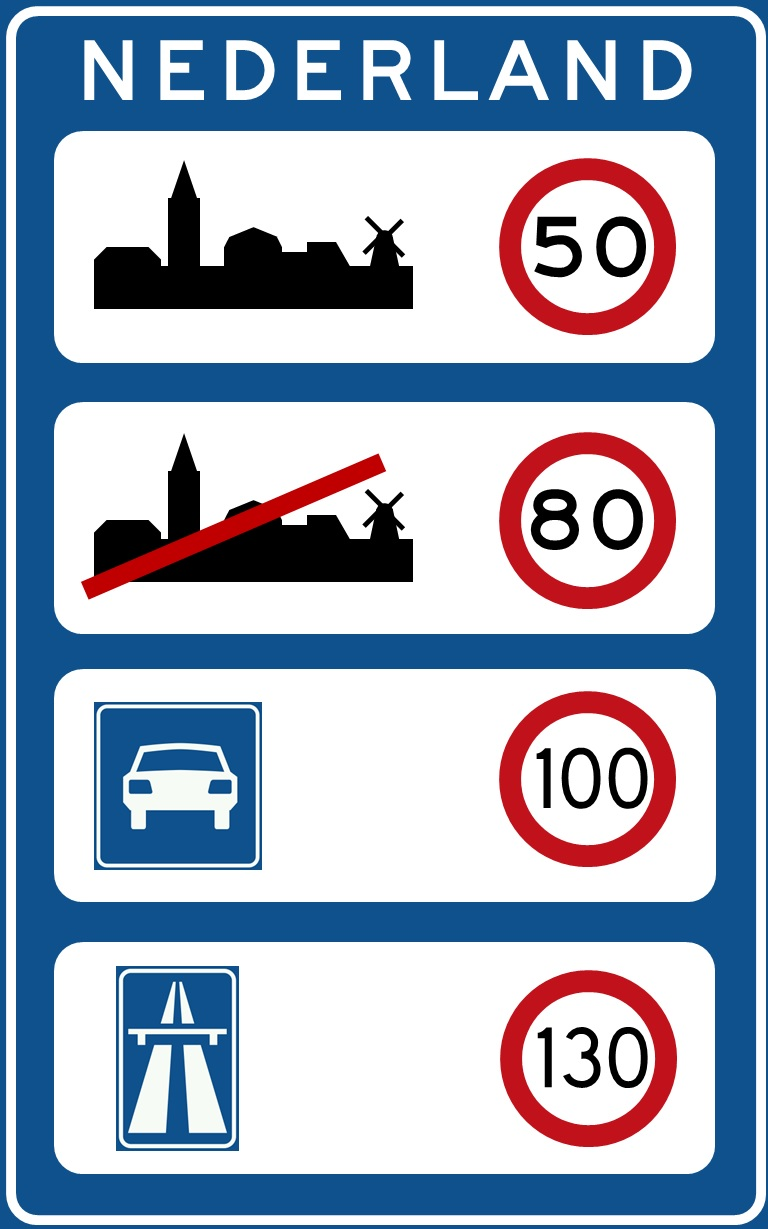
Border crossing sign indicating which speed limits apply in the Netherlands

The default speed limits in the Netherlands are 50 kilometres per hour (31 mph) inside built-up areas; 80 km/h (50 mph) outside built-up areas; 100 km/h (62 mph) on expressways (autowegen); and, as of 16 March 2020, 100 km/h from 06:00 to 19:00 and 130 km/h (81 mph) from 19:00 to 06:00 on motorways (autosnelwegen). As of 14 April 2025, on three motorways, the daytime limit of 100 km/h has been lifted.

Additionally, lower speed limits may apply in speed zones. Motorways passing through urban areas are usually limited to 100 km/h and narrow regional roads may have 60 km/h (37 mph) speed limits.

In urban residential areas, 30 km/h (19 mph) zones are found, as well as home zones (woonerven), in which vehicles must adhere to a walking pace (15 km/h (9.3 mph) is tolerated). Contrarily, some four-lane urban arterial roads have a posted 70 km/h (43 mph) speed limit.

Unlike neighbouring countries such as Belgium, there is no minimum speed on Dutch motorways. However, only motorized vehicles capable of driving at least 50 km/h and 60 km/h are allowed to enter Dutch expressways and motorways, respectively.

== History ==
The Netherlands did not have specific night speed limits until 2020. Nevertheless, many motorways have a posted speed limit of 120 km/h (75 mph) between 19:00 and 6:00, which automatically allows a higher speed on night times with a lower traffic density.

Starting in May 2002, 80 km/h zones have been introduced on some motorways that had daily traffic congestion and air pollution issues; however, most of these zones have been or will be abolished, with the exception of short stretches of the A20 ring road near Rotterdam and the A10 ring road near Amsterdam. On 1 September 2012, the motorway default speed limit was raised from 120 km/h (75 mph) to 130 km/h (81 mph), but it applies to only 48% of all motorways with the intent of 60% of motorways.

The State of the Netherlands v. Urgenda Foundation court case was decided in favour of its plaintiff Urgenda (initially in June 2015, upheld on appeal in October 2018, and finally confirmed by the Supreme Court of the Netherlands on 20 December 2019), who successfully forced the government to implement the necessary measures to reduce the Netherlands' CO_{2} emissions from 1990 levels by 25% by 2020. Although the government was free to choose which measures it would take to achieve this reduction, the plaintiff and other environmentalists suggested lowering the speed limit as one of several effective options to do so. Meanwhile, the nitrogen crisis in the Netherlands since 2019, which indirectly caused the 2019–2020 Dutch farmers' protests, convinced the government on 13 November 2019 to lower the speed limits in the Netherlands on national roads to 100 kilometres per hour during the day, from 6 am (6:00) to 7 pm (19:00). Only during nighttime the former limit of 130 km/h (81 mph) remained.

== Truck and trailer speed limits ==
In the Netherlands, a speed limit of 80 km/h applies for heavy trucks and buses (other than the T100 buses). A speed limit of 100 km/h applies for T100 buses (defined as a non articulated bus meeting various technical requirements such as no standing places and no re profiled tires) 90 km/h for passenger cars, motorcycles, tricycles, LCVs, T100 buses towing trailers with a permitted maximum mass not exceeding 3500 kg, and 80 km/h for all other vehicle combinations

== Speed limit enforcement ==
Dutch rally driver, Maus Gatsonides, is famed for inventing the Gatso speed camera and founding the Gatsometer BV company (which is now Sensys Gatso). The Netherlands was the first country to use the speed cameras with trials of the technology starting in the late 1950s.

Speed limit enforcement is extensive on Dutch roads, including traffic enforcement cameras in urban area and radar guns on national roads and motorways. Furthermore, fixed average speed checks (trajectcontrole), which were first introduced in the Netherlands, are now in operation on many motorways in the densely populated Randstad region. In case of speeding, there is a legal speed correction of 3 km/h (3% if over 100 km/h) plus a fixed 3 km/h tolerance margin for posted speed limits up to 120 km/h (i.e. you will be fined from 4 km/h over). For example, when caught at 108 km/h on a national road, one will be fined for exceeding the speed limit by 3.24 km/h. When driving at 107 km/h, no speeding ticket will be issued.

== See also ==
- Speed limit
- Speed limits by country
- Road signs in the Netherlands
- Transport in the Netherlands
