= Provincial road N214 (Netherlands) =

Road in the Netherlands

Provincial highway 214
- Provinciale weg 214
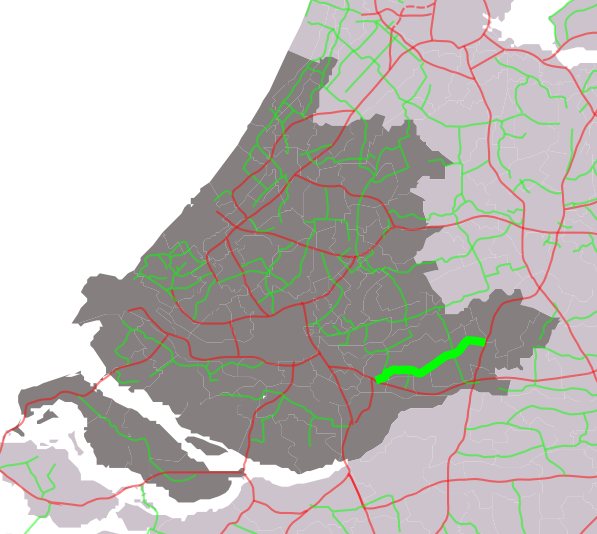

Route information
- Length: 21.4 km (13.3 mi)

Major junctions
- West end: Papendrecht, Dordrecht
- East end: Leerdam

Location
- Country: Kingdom of the Netherlands
- Constituent country: Netherlands
- Provinces: South Holland

Highway system
- Roads in the Netherlands; Motorways; E-roads; Provincial; City routes

Provincial road N214 is a Dutch provincial road in the province South Holland. Renovations on the road to improve greenery, intersections, and bike paths were scheduled to begin in September 2026.
