= Provincial road N225 (Netherlands) =

Provincial road in the Netherlands

Provincial highway 225
- Provinciale weg 225
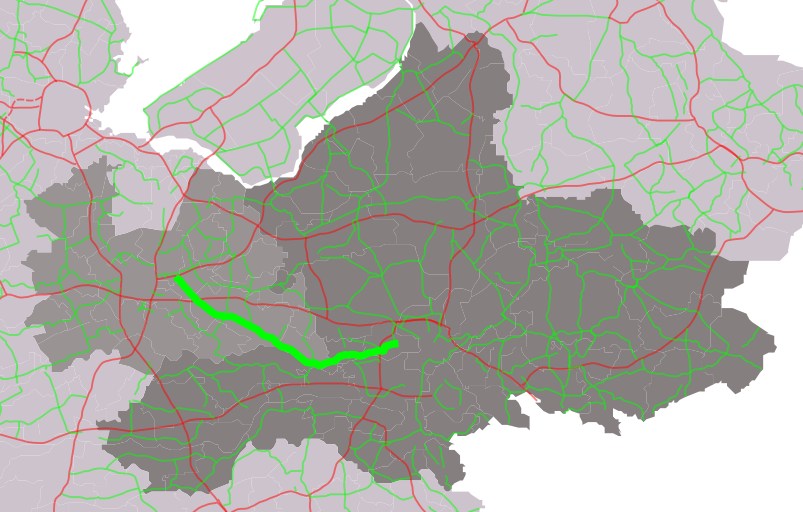

Major junctions
- West end: E35 / A 12 – Driebergen
- East end: A 325 / N 325 – Arnhem

Location
- Country: Kingdom of the Netherlands
- Constituent country: Netherlands
- Provinces: Gelderland

Highway system
- Roads in the Netherlands; Motorways; E-roads; Provincial; City routes

Provincial road N225 is a Dutch provincial road in Utrecht and Gelderland. It runs from Driebergen to Arnhem via Doorn, Leersum, Amerongen, Elst, Rhenen, Wageningen, Renkum, Heelsum and Oosterbeek.
