= A73 motorway (Netherlands) =

Freeway in the Netherlands

A73 motorway
- Rijksweg 73
- Location of the A73 motorway

Route information
- Length: 106 km (66 mi)

Major junctions
- North end: A50 in Beuningen
- South end: A2 in Maasbracht

Location
- Country: Kingdom of the Netherlands
- Constituent country: Netherlands
- Provinces: Gelderland, North Brabant, Limburg

Highway system
- Roads in the Netherlands; Motorways; E-roads; Provincial; City routes

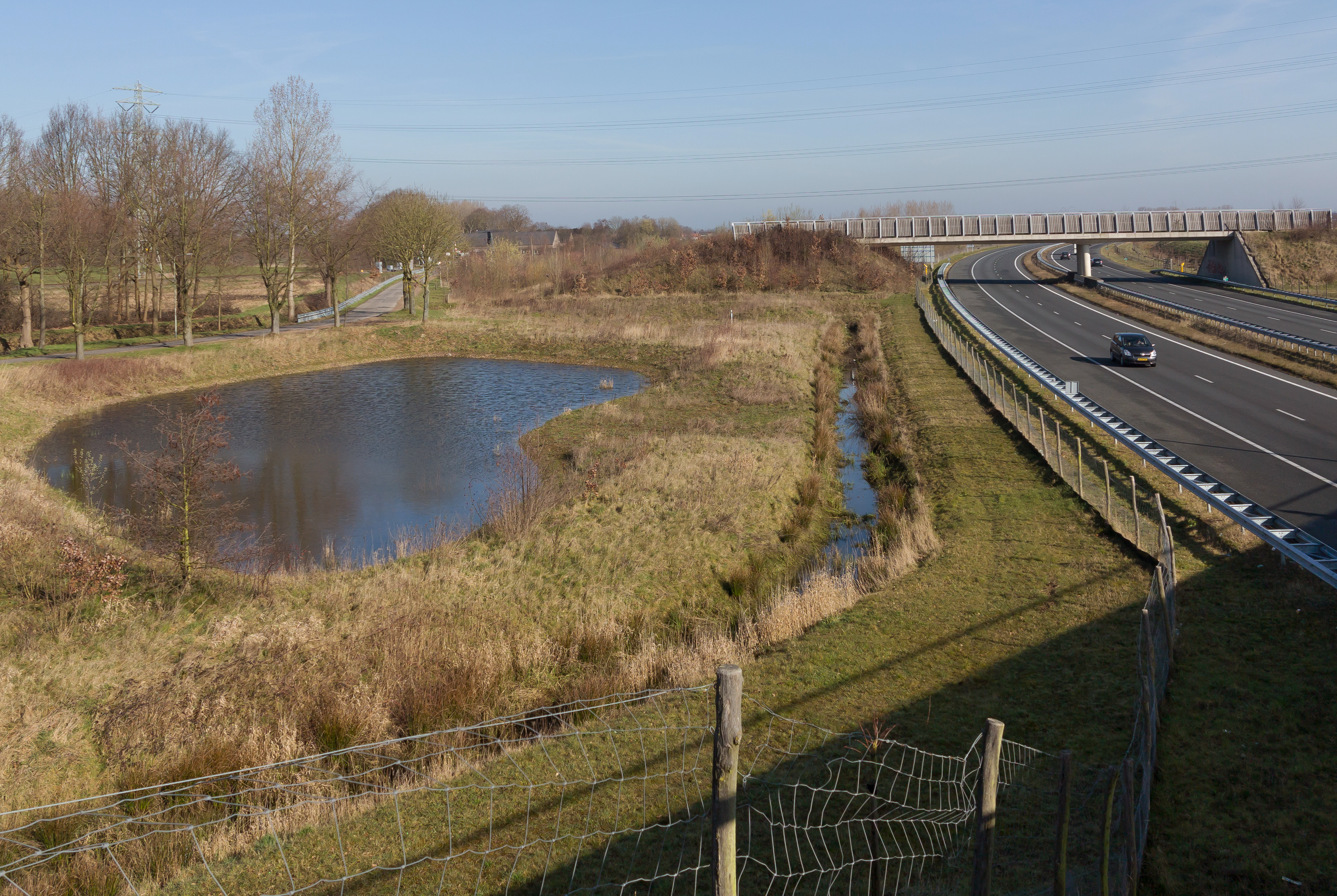
near Roermond, the A73 motorway

The A73 motorway (Dutch: Rijksweg 73) is a motorway in the Netherlands. It is 106 kilometers in length and connects the A50 at the Ewijk interchange in Beuningen through Venlo and Roermond to the Het Vonderen interchange with the A2 in Maasbracht.

For its entire route, the A73 follows the path of the Meuse river, thereby opening up north and central Limburg to traffic.
