= List of motorways in the Netherlands =

Motorways in the Netherlands
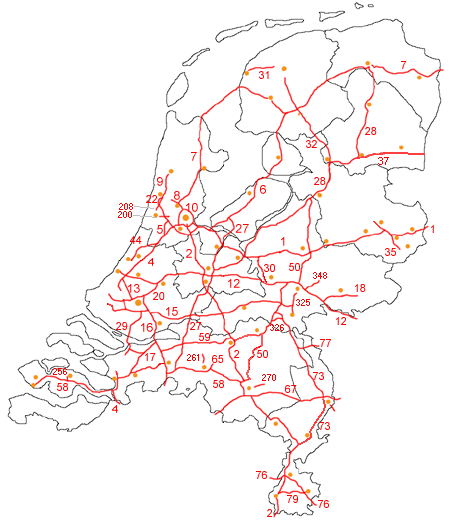
- Motorways in the Netherlands highlighted in red

System information
- Maintained by Rijkswaterstaat

Highway names

System links
- Roads in the Netherlands; Motorways; E-roads; Provincial; City routes

These are the Netherlands' motorways by their national number, listed with the most important towns at or near the roads. The numbers start with 'A' for 'autosnelweg' (motorway in Dutch). Some of these also carry one or more European E-road numbers on (sections of) their trajectory. Although E-roads in the Netherlands are virtually all motorways, the trajectories are frequently not the same.

== Motorways ==
Number	Length (km)	Length (mi)	Southern or western terminus	Northern or eastern terminus	Formed	Removed	Notes
A 1	157.733	98.011	A10 in Amsterdam	A 30 at German border east of De Lutte	1933	current	Amsterdam - Hilversum - Amersfoort - Apeldoorn - Deventer - Hengelo - Germany (Bad Bentheim)
A 2	217.098	134.898	A10 & S110 in Amsterdam	A25 at Belgian border south of Eijsden	1954	current	Amsterdam - Utrecht - 's-Hertogenbosch - Eindhoven - Weert - Geleen - Maastricht - Belgium (Visé)
A 3	—	—	A10 in Amsterdam	A15 south of Dordrecht	1932	1977	Planned but never built; now A20 and N3
A 4	119	74	A10 in Amsterdam	A15 in Hoogvliet	1938	current	Amsterdam - Schiphol - Hoofddorp - Leiden - The Hague - Delft - Schiedam - Vlaardingen - Hoogvliet
A 4	—	—	A29/A59 northeast of Heijningen	A12 at Belgian border southeast of Ossendrecht	1938	current	Heijningen - Bergen op Zoom - Belgium (Antwerp)
A 5	18.830	11.700	A10 in Amsterdam	A4 east of Hoofddorp	1991	current	Hoofddorp - Amsterdam
A 6	102.557	63.726	A1 south of Muiderberg	A7 southeast of Joure	1959	current	from A1 - Almere - Lelystad - Emmeloord - Joure
A 7	240.969	149.731	S151 & S155 in Zaandam	A 280 at German border south of Bad Nieuweschans	1933	current	Zaanstad - Purmerend - Hoorn - (Afsluitdijk) - Sneek - Heerenveen - Drachten - Groningen - Hoogezand - Winschoten - Bad Nieuweschans - Germany (Bunde)
A 8	9.966	6.193	A10 in Amsterdam	N8/N246 north of Westzaan	1961	current	Amsterdam - Zaanstad
A 9	95.673	59.448	A1 & S114 in Diemen	N9/N242 south of Alkmaar	1957	current	from A1 - Amsterdam Zuidoost - Amstelveen - Badhoevedorp - Haarlem - Beverwijk - Alkmaar
A 10	32.067	19.926	A8 in Amsterdam	A8 in Amsterdam	1961	current	Amsterdam ring
A 12	136.818	85.015	N44 & S101 in The Hague	A 3 at German border east of Babberich	1936	current	Germany (Oberhausen) - Zevenaar - Arnhem - Ede - Utrecht - Gouda - Zoetermeer - The Hague
A 13	16.755	10.411	A20 & S113 in Rotterdam	A4 in The Hague	1933	current	The Hague - Rotterdam
A 14	—	—	A20 at Rotterdam Wilgenplas	Landscheidsweg near Leidschendam	—	—	Planned, but only the section between the A4 and N44 opened in 2003 as the N14
A 15	204.150	126.853	N15 south of Rozenburg	A325 & N325/S110 west of Het Hoog	1939	current	Europoort - Rotterdam - Dordrecht - Gorinchem - Tiel - Nijmegen
A 16	58.098	36.100	A20 in Rotterdam	A1 in Hazeldonk	1936	current	Extension to Amsterdam cancelled in 1973; planned to be extended to Rotterdam Airport
A 17	26.593	16.524	A16/A59 east of Moerdijk	A58 in Roosendaal	1962	current	Moerdijk - Roosendaal
A 18	22	14	A12 northeast of Babberich	N18 northwest of Varsseveld	1969	current	Portion of the A15
A 19	—	—	A4, Ypenburg junction	Bergen op Zoom	—	1976	Renumbered to a portion of the A4
A 20	38.862	24.148	N213 & N220 in Maasdijk	A12 east of Gouda	1932	current	Gouda - Rotterdam - Vlaardingen - Maassluis
A 22	8.348	5.187	A9 east of Velserbroek	A9 east of Beverwijk	1941	current	Velsen - Beverwijk
A 24	5	3.1	A15 at Rozenburg	A20 at the Krabbeplas	2015	current	Opened dec 2024, toll
A 27	108.728	67.560	A58 northeast of Rijsbergen	A6 east of Almere	1950	current	Breda - Gorinchem - Utrecht - Hilversum - Huizen - Almere
A 28	187.471	116.489	A27 east of Utrecht	N7 in Groningen	1938	current	Utrecht - Amersfoort - Harderwijk - Zwolle - Meppel - Hoogeveen - Assen - Groningen
A 29	13.410	8.333	A15 & S103 in Barendrecht	A4 & A59 northeast of Heijningen	1965	current	Rotterdam - Dinteloord
A 30	18.204	11.311	A12 east of Ede	A1 northwest of Barneveld	c. 1970	current	Barneveld - Ede
A 31	64.577	40.126	A7 southwest of Harlingen	A7 & N381 west of Drachten	1958	current	Harlingen - Leeuwarden
A 32	65.936	40.971	A28 south of Meppel	N31 south of Leeuwarden	1828	current	Meppel - Steenwijk - Heerenveen - Akkrum - Leeuwarden
A 35	35.659	22.157	N35 & N350 south of Wierden	N35 in Enschede	1949	current	Enschede - Hengelo - Almelo - Wierden
A 37	42.092	26.155	A28 & N48 south of Hoogeveen	B402 at German border east of Zwartemeer	1962	current	Hoogeveen - Emmen - Zwartemeer
A 38	2	1.2	A15/A16 in Ridderkerk	S105 in Ridderkerk	1979	current	from A15 - A16 - Ridderkerk
A 44	27.850	17.305	N44 east of Wassenaar	A4 & N207 northwest of Leimuiden	1938	current	Wassenaar - Leiden - Nieuw Vennep
A 50	159.591	99.165	A2 north of Eindhoven	A28 & N50 north of Hattemerbroek	1941	current	Eindhoven - Oss - Wijchen - Arnhem - Apeldoorn - Zwolle
A 58	136.916	85.076	N288 in Vlissingen	A2 northeast of Eindhoven	1939	current	Eindhoven - Tilburg - Breda - Roosendaal - Bergen op Zoom - Goes - Middelburg - Vlissingen
A 59	121.095	75.245	A4 & A29 northeast of Heijningen	A50 southeast of Oss	1948	current	Willemstad - Moerdijk - Waalwijk - 's-Hertogenbosch - Oss
A 65	21.643	13.448	A58 & N269 southeast of Tilburg	N65 south of Berkel-Enschot	1955	current	Tilburg - Berkel-Enschot
A 67	77.881	48.393	A21 at Belgian border southwest of Eersel	A 40 at German border east of Venlo	1956	current	Belgium (Turnhout) - Eindhoven - Venlo - Germany (Duisburg)
A 73	105.713	65.687	A2 north of Echt	A50 & N322 west of Beuningen	1970	current	from A50 - Nijmegen - Venlo - Roermond - A2 near Maastricht
A 74	1.893	1.176	A 61 at German border east of Heide	A73 east of Tegelen	2010	current	Venlo - Germany (Kaldenkirchen)
A 76	27.008	16.782	A2 at Belgian border southwest of Stein	A 4 at German border east of Bocholtz	1937	current	Belgium (Genk) - Stein - Geleen - Heerlen - Germany (Aachen)
A 77	10.135	6.298	A73 northeast of Rijkevoort	A57 east of Heijen	1975	current	Boxmeer - Germany (Goch)
A 79	17.731	11.018	A2 northeast of Maastricht	A76 southwest of Heerlen	1970	current	Maastricht - Heerlen
A 80	—	—	A16 near Zwaanshoek	A27 near Hilversum	—	—	Planned (would replace N201) but never built
A 200	11.866	7.373	N200/R106 east of Haarlem	N200 north of Zwanenburg	1962	current	Zwanenburg-East - Haarlem-East (former A5)
A 205	1	0.62	A9 at Rottepolderplein interchange	N205 in Haarlem	—	—	Shortest highway in the Netherlands
A 208	1.522	0.946	N208 at Velserbroek interchange, Haarlem	A22 at IJmuiden interchange	—	—	
A 256	3	1.9	A58 southwest of Goes	N256 & N664 west of Goes	1961	current	from A5 - Goes
A 261	—	—	A58 at Tilburg-Noord interchange	N261 at Loon on Zand interchange	—	2014	Downgraded to N261
A 270	3.3	2.1	N270 northwest of Eindhoven	N270 southeast of Nuenen	c. 1974	current	Eindhoven - Helmond
A 325	8	5.0	A15 & S110 west of Het Hoog	N225 & N325 in Arnhem	2010	current	Former portion of A52
A 326	6	3.7	A50 west of Wijchen	S103 north of Wijchen	c. 1995	current	Former S109
A 348	10	6.2	A12 & N325 in Arnhem	N348 & N317 south of Dieren	—	—	Former A48
A 783	1.5	0.93	A73, Neerbosch junction	Outskirts of Nijmegen	—	—	Signed as A73; A783 is an internal designation
Former

== Former motorways ==
The following routes lost their motorway-status:

- A22: Utrecht (current Waterlinieweg)
- A33: Assen (current N 33)
- A68: Haelen - Roermond-West (current N 280)
- A76: Heerlen - Bocholtz (current N 281)
- A205: A9 - Haarlem-West (current N 205)
- A261: Tilburg - Loon op Zand (current N 261)

== See also ==
- Transport in the Netherlands
- List of controlled-access highway systems
- Evolution of motorway construction in European nations
- List of E-roads in the Netherlands
