= A44 motorway (Netherlands) =

Freeway in the Netherlands

A44 motorway
- Rijksweg 44
- Location of the A44 motorway

Location
- Country: Kingdom of the Netherlands
- Constituent country: Netherlands

Highway system
- Roads in the Netherlands; Motorways; E-roads; Provincial; City routes

The A44 motorway is a motorway in the Netherlands connecting the A4 with Wassenaar. The route continues as main road N44 towards The Hague, providing an alternative link with Amsterdam for the A4 motorway. The A44 also serves Leiden and the Bollenstreek. The length of the A44 is 21 kilometres (13 mi), the N44 adds another 7 kilometres (4.3 mi) making the total route 28 kilometres (17 mi) long.

== Overview ==
Near Leimuiden, the A44 motorway splits from the A4 at Burgerveen interchange. Until the 1960s, the A4 followed the route of the current A44 passing Leiden west. Then the new A4 was built east of the city creating a more direct route from Amsterdam to Rotterdam. The former A4 was eventually renumbered into A44. Both motorways are important arteries for The Hague, where the A44 is primarily focused on the city center. The A44 is one of the oldest motorways of the country with parts dating from the 1930s. Small dimensions of the carriageway, narrow bridges and tight junctions are signs of outdated design. It is also remarkable that the A44 is one of the very few busy Randstad-motorways not being equipped with active traffic management nor lit for the major part.

When leaving the Burgerveen interchange in the province of North Holland, the A44 runs through rural area known as the Bollenstreek. In Spring the fields fill up with coloured flowers. A few towns pass by and the motorway crosses the Ringvaart where it enters the province of South Holland. The surroundings of the A44 become more populated when approaching Leiden. The motorway ends a few kilometers south of Leiden in Wassenaar at an at-grade junction with traffic lights. The route continues as major road N44, running through the wooded estates of Wassenaar towards The Hague. The N44 ends at the city limits of The Hague. Here, the route continues as city route s101 towards the city centre. A split-level interchange connects the N44 with the N14 (Ring Den Haag) towards Leidschendam and the S200 (Ring Den Haag) towards Scheveningen.

== Exit list ==
Province	Municipality	km.	#	Name	Roads	Notes
North Holland	Haarlemmermeer	0		Interchange Burgerveen	A4	Southbound entrance, northbound exit
North Holland	Haarlemmermeer	1	1	Oude Wetering		
North Holland	Haarlemmermeer	5	2	Kaag (Dorp)		
South Holland	Teylingen	7	3	Noordwijkerhout	N208	
South Holland	Teylingen	10	4	Warmond		
South Holland	Teylingen	12	5	Sassenheim		Southbound entrance, northbound exit
South Holland	Teylingen	13	6	Voorhout	N444	
South Holland	Oegstgeest	15	7	Oegstgeest		
South Holland	Oegstgeest	17	8	Leiden	N206	
South Holland	Oegstgeest	19	9	Leiden-Zuid		Southbound entrance, northbound exit
South Holland	Wassenaar	21		Wassenaar		Traffic lights
South Holland	Wassenaar	Main road N44				
South Holland	Wassenaar	22		Voorschoten	N448	Traffic lights
South Holland	Wassenaar	28		Leidschendam, Scheveningen	N14 S200	Split-level
The Hague city limits. This road continues as s101.
