= N3 motorway (Netherlands) =

Freeway in the Netherlands

N3, or rijksweg 3, is a freeway in the province of South Holland in the Netherlands. It connects Dordrecht-Zuid with Papendrecht. It's a freeway that connects the motorways A15 and the A16. There are seven exits.
