= A38 motorway =

Freeway in the Netherlands

Coordinates: 51.8819°N 4.58°E

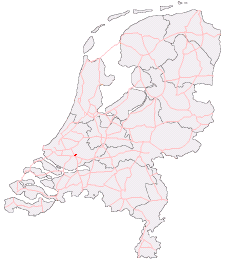
Location of the A38 motorway.

The A38 motorway is a motorway in the Netherlands. With a total length of just 1.5 kilometers, it is one of the shortest motorways in the Netherlands.

== Overview ==
The road begins at the northern part of the interchange Ridderkerk, where it connects to both the A15 motorway as well as the A16 motorway. The other end of the road is at the junction with the Rotterdamseweg in the town of Ridderkerk. The section in between does not feature any exits.

The connection between the interchange Ridderkerk and the A38 motorway is presented as 'exit Ridderkerk' rather than as an actual connection to a motorway. However, the entire length of the 'exit' has the official status of motorway. Because the connection is presented as an exit, the number A38 cannot be found on any road signs, and serves purely as an administrative number.

== Exit list ==
The entire route is in Ridderkerk, South Holland Province.

km	mi	Exit	Name	Destinations	Notes
21	13	—	Interchange Ridderkerk-Noord	E19 / A 15 / A 16	
19	12	—	Ridderkerk	S 105 (Rotterdamseweg)	
1.000 mi = 1.609 km; 1.000 km = 0.621 mi
