= Heijen =

- Village
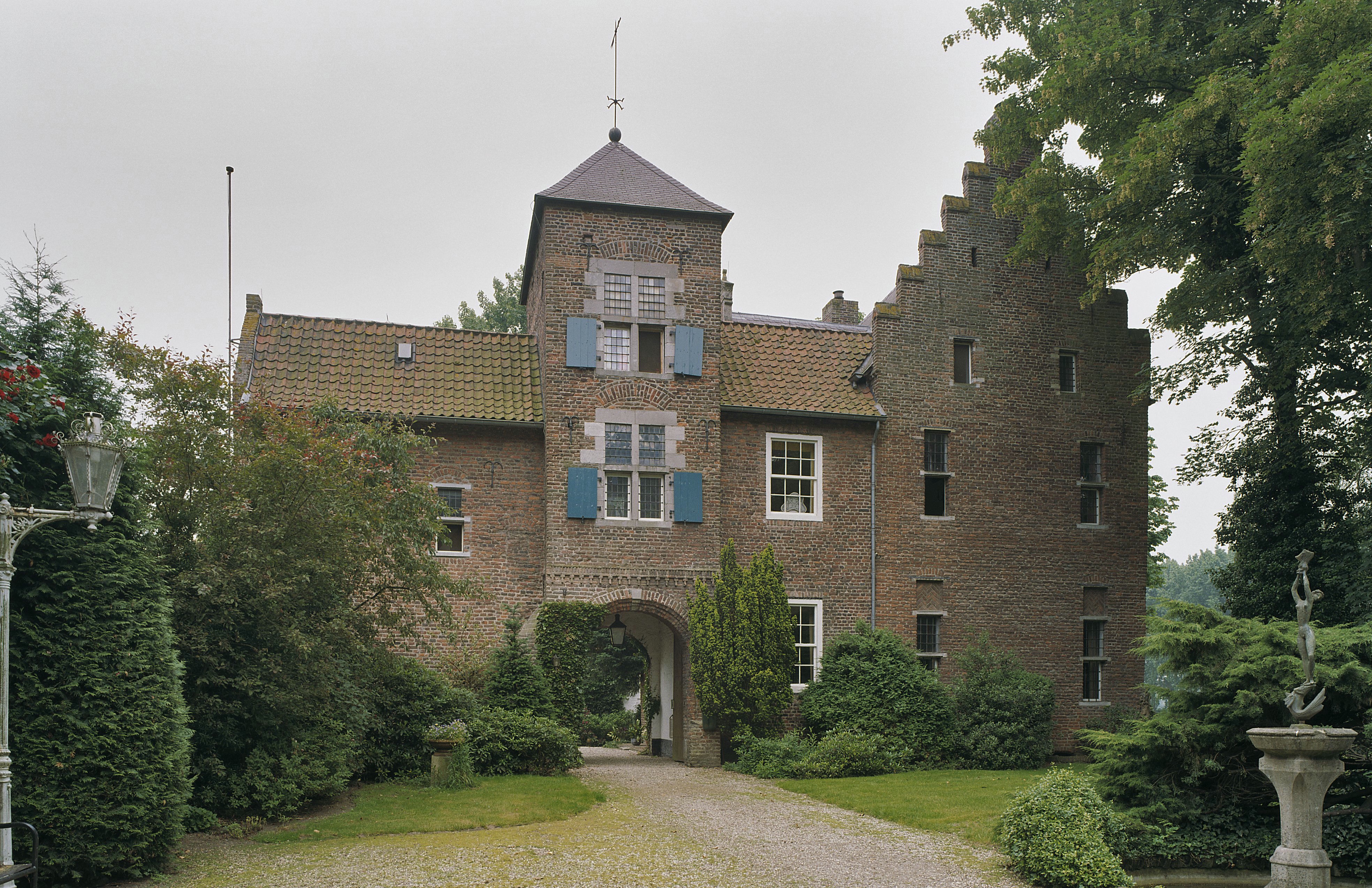
- Huis Heijen

- Location in the Netherlands Location in the province of Limburg in the Netherlands
- Coordinates: 51°41′N 5°59′E
- Country: Netherlands
- Province: Limburg (Netherlands)
- Municipality: Gennep

Area
  - Total: 7.43 km^{2} (2.87 sq mi)
- Elevation: 14 m (46 ft)

Population (2021)
  - Total: 1,770
  - Density: 238/km^{2} (617/sq mi)
- Time zone: UTC+1 (CET)
  - Summer (DST): UTC+2 (CEST)
- Postal code: 6598
- Dialing code: 0485

Heijen is a village in the south-east Netherlands. It is located in the municipality of Gennep, Limburg.

== History ==
The village was first mentioned in 1271 as "in Heiden", and means heath. Heijen is a linear settlement which developed along the Nijmegen to Venlo road.

Huis Heijen started as a castle which was probably built in the 11th century. The current manor house was constructed in the 16th century. In the 18th century, several annexes and the gate were added. It was severely damaged in 1945 and restored in the 1950s.

The Catholic St Dionysius is a three-aisled church with detached tower which was built between 1954 and 1955. The grist mill Gerardamolen was rebuilt at his current location in 1950. In 1851, it was a polder mill in Aengwirden (nowadays: Heerenveen). It was in service until 1966 and bought by the municipality in 1976 who restored the wind mill. It operates on a voluntary basis.

Heijen was home to 350 people in 1840. The village was severely damaged in 1945. In 1969, an industrial harbour was built to the north of Heijen.

== Gallery ==
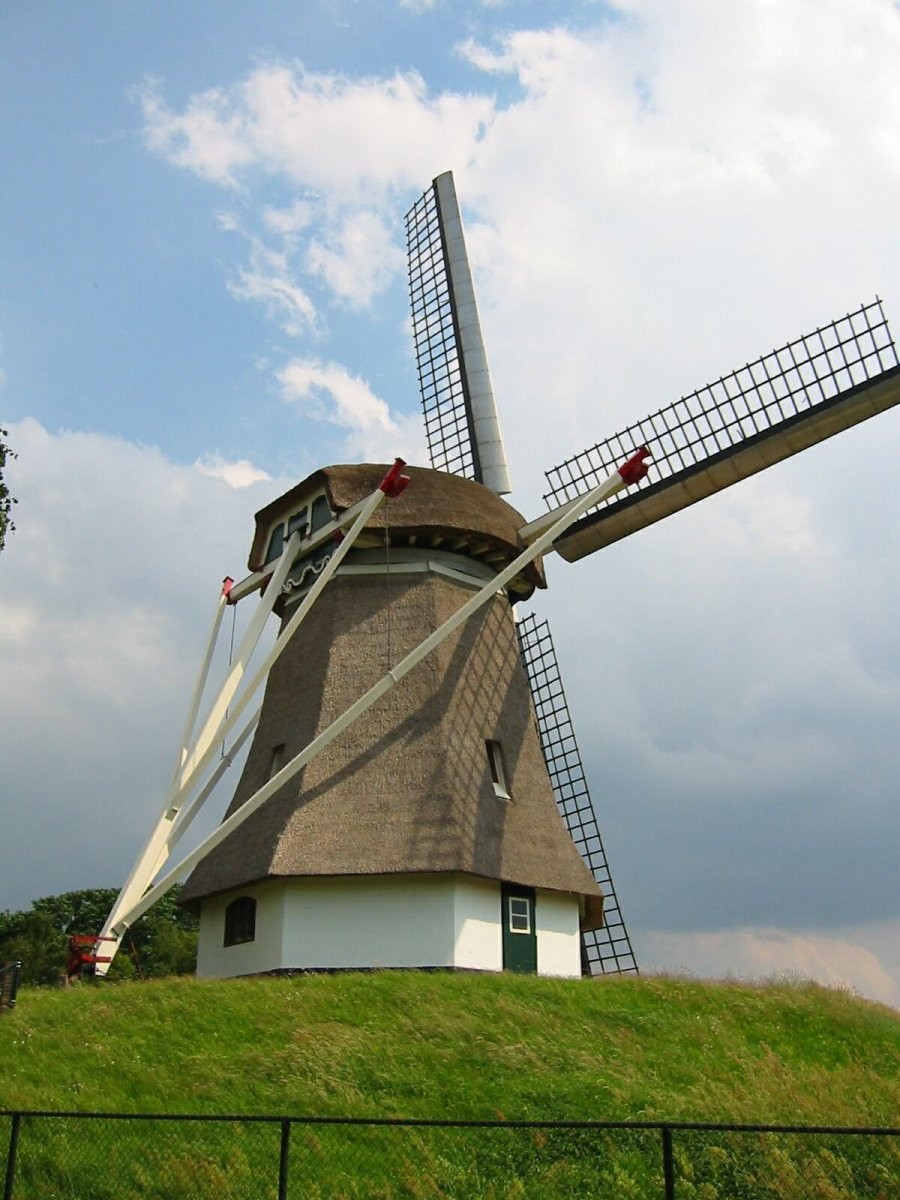
Windmill Gerarda

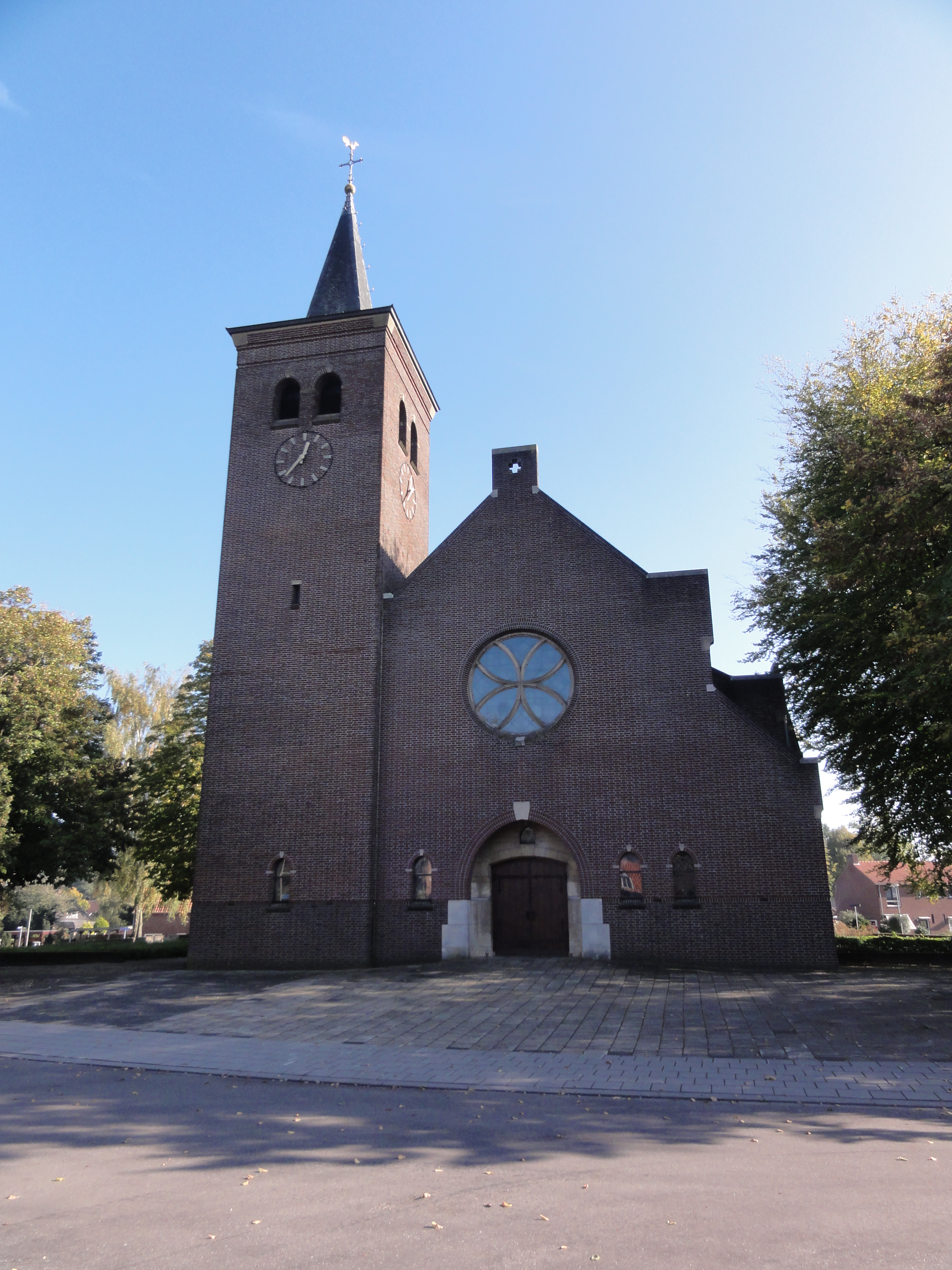
St Dionysius Church
