= European route E312 =

Road in trans-European E-road network

E312

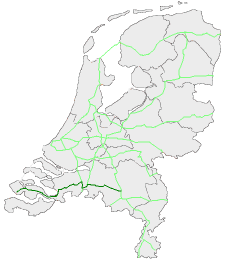
- European routes in the Netherlands with E312 in dark green

Major junctions
- From: Flushing (Netherlands)
- To: Eindhoven (Netherlands)

Location
- Countries: Netherlands

Highway system
- International E-road network; A Class; B Class

E 312 is a European B class road in the Netherlands, connecting the cities of Flushing (Vlissingen) and Eindhoven.

During its entire course, it follows highway 58 (A58) and is a motorway.

- Road connections:
  - N98 (Highway 57 - Middelburg)
  - N99 (Highway 4 - Bergen op Zoom)
  - E19 (Highway 16 - Princenhage)
  - E311 (Highway 27 - Ginneken en Bavel)
  - N93 (Highway 65 - Tilburg)
  - E25 (Highway 2 - Best)
  - N94 (Highway 50 - Eindhoven)

Before the renumbering of the E-roads in the 1980s, the section between Breda and Eindhoven was known as E 38, while the section heading to Flushing was then part of National Road 97.
