= European route E25 in the Netherlands =

European route E 25
- Europese weg E25
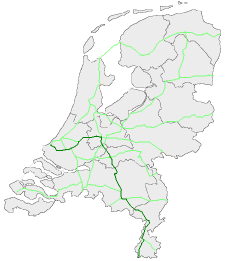
- European routes in the Netherlands with E 25 in dark green

Route information
- Maintained by Rijkswaterstaat

Major junctions
- North end: Hook of Holland
- South end: Belgium border

Location
- Country: Kingdom of the Netherlands
- Constituent country: Netherlands
- Provinces: South Holland, Utrecht, Gelderland, North Brabant, Limburg

Highway system
- International E-road network; A Class; B Class
← E22	→ E30

European route E 25 (E 25) is a north–south European route, running from Hook of Holland in the Netherlands to Palermo in Italy. In the Netherlands, the highway runs from its northern terminus in Hook of Holland south–eastward through Rotterdam, Utrecht, 's-Hertogenbosch, Eindhoven and Maastricht to the Belgian border, near Eijsden.

The highway is maintained by Rijkswaterstaat.

== Exit list ==
Province	Municipality	km	mi	Exit	Destinations	Notes
South Holland	Rotterdam	0.000	0.000			
1.000 mi = 1.609 km; 1.000 km = 0.621 mi: Concurrency terminus

== See also ==
European route E25
Previous country: Terminus	Netherlands	Next country: Belgium
