= List of E-roads in the Netherlands =

European routes in the Netherlands
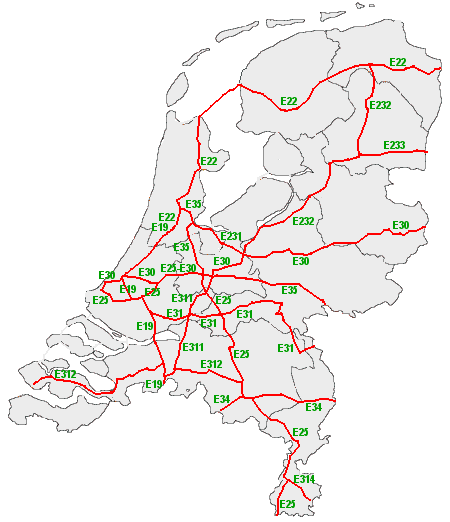
- European routes in the Netherlands highlighted in red

System information
- Maintained by Rijkswaterstaat

Highway names
- European routes: European route E nn (E nn)

System links
- International E-road network; A Class; B Class

E-road marker on Dutch road sign

This is a list of the European Routes, or E-road highways, that run through the Netherlands. The current network is signposted according to the 1985 system revision, and contains seven Class A roads and six Class B roads within the country. Almost without exception, these are motorways that also carry various national A-numbers (for Autosnelweg). Only two small stretches of the E25 and the E30 are provincial roads (the N220 and N211 respectively).

== History ==
The original E-road numbering of 1957 included ten routes, but was supplanted by the 1985 revision.

== Class-A European routes ==
Number	Length (km)	Length (mi)	Southern or western terminus	Northern or eastern terminus	Formed	Removed	Notes
E19	140	87	Amsterdam	Belgian border in Breda	—	—	Follows A10, A4, A13, A20, A16, A59, and A58
E22	260	160	Amsterdam	German border at Bad Nieuweschans	—	—	Follows A10, N7 and A7
E25	275	171	Hook of Holland	Belgian border near Eijsden	—	—	Follows N220, A20, A12, and A2
E30	230	140	Ferry service at Hook of Holland	German border near De Lutte	—	—	Follows N211, A4, A12, A27, A28, and A1
E31	135	84	Ridderkerk	German border in Gennep	—	—	Follows A15, A73 and A77
E34	80	50	Belgian border in Bladel	German border in Venlo	—	—	Follows A67
E35	130	81	Amsterdam	German border at Zevenaar	—	—	Follows A10, A2 and A12; original route to Groningen now E231 and E232

Class-A European rouutes

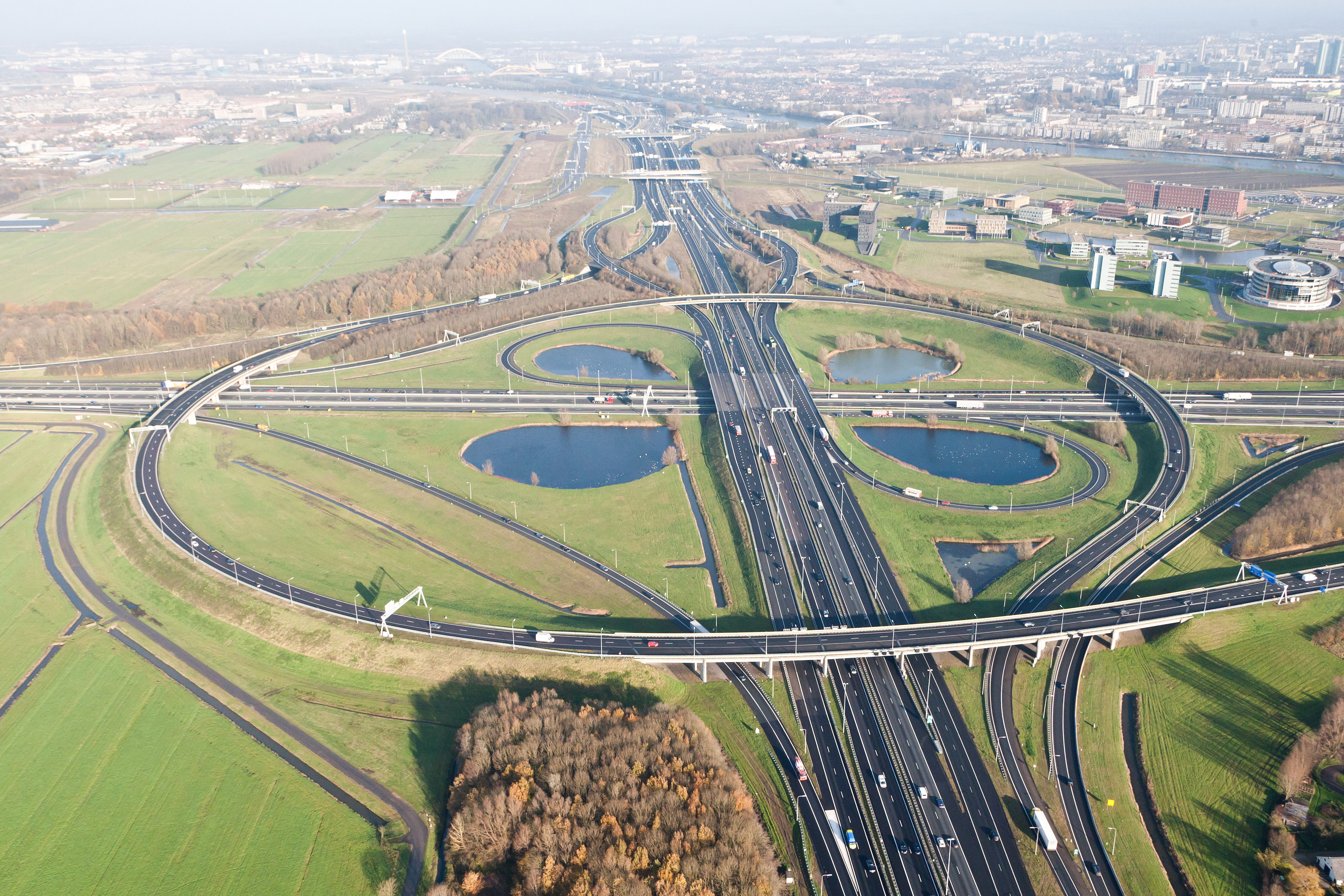
E 25, E 30 and E 35 interchange south of Utrecht

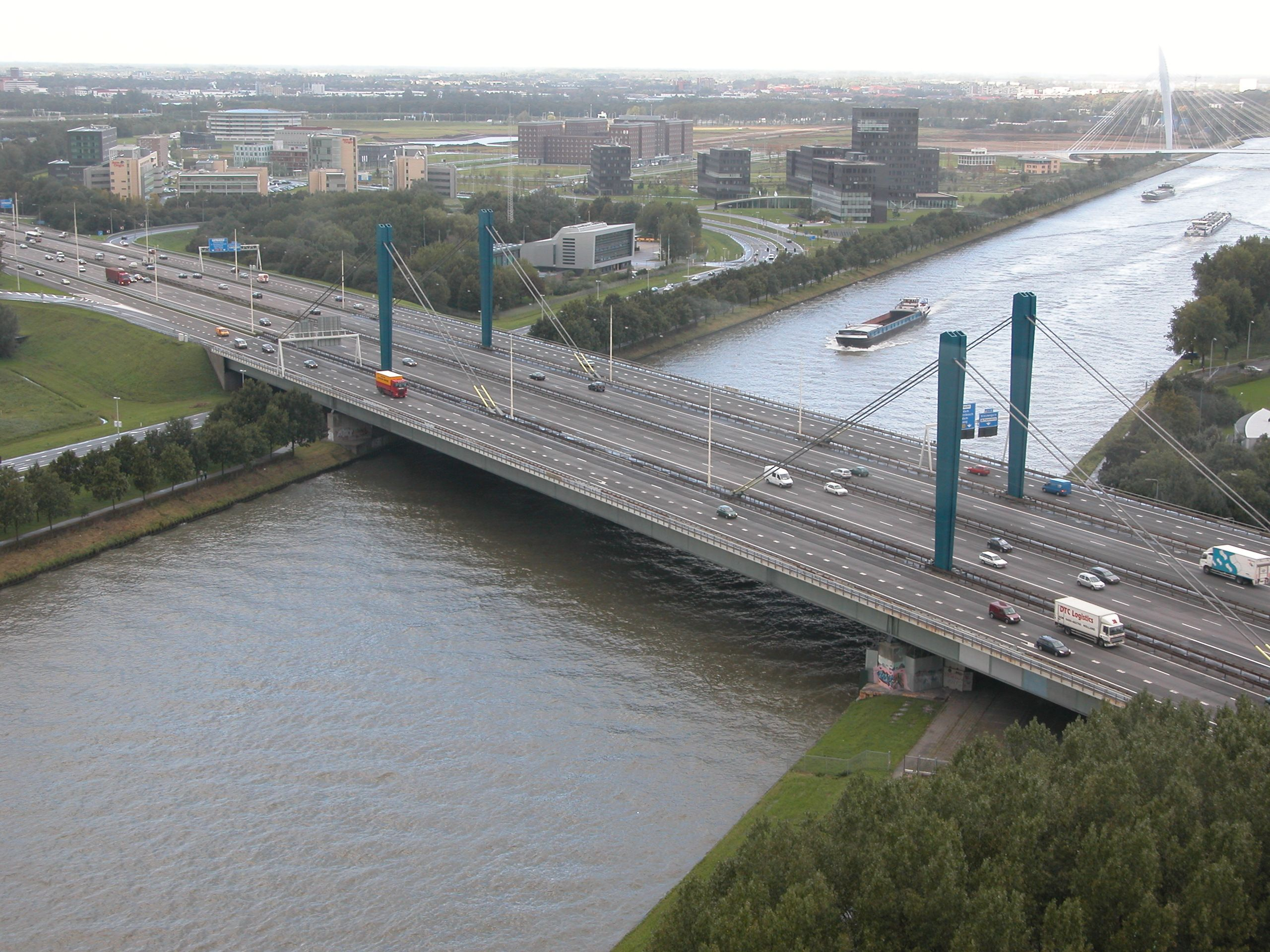
Galecopperbrug carrying E 30 and E 35 in Utrecht

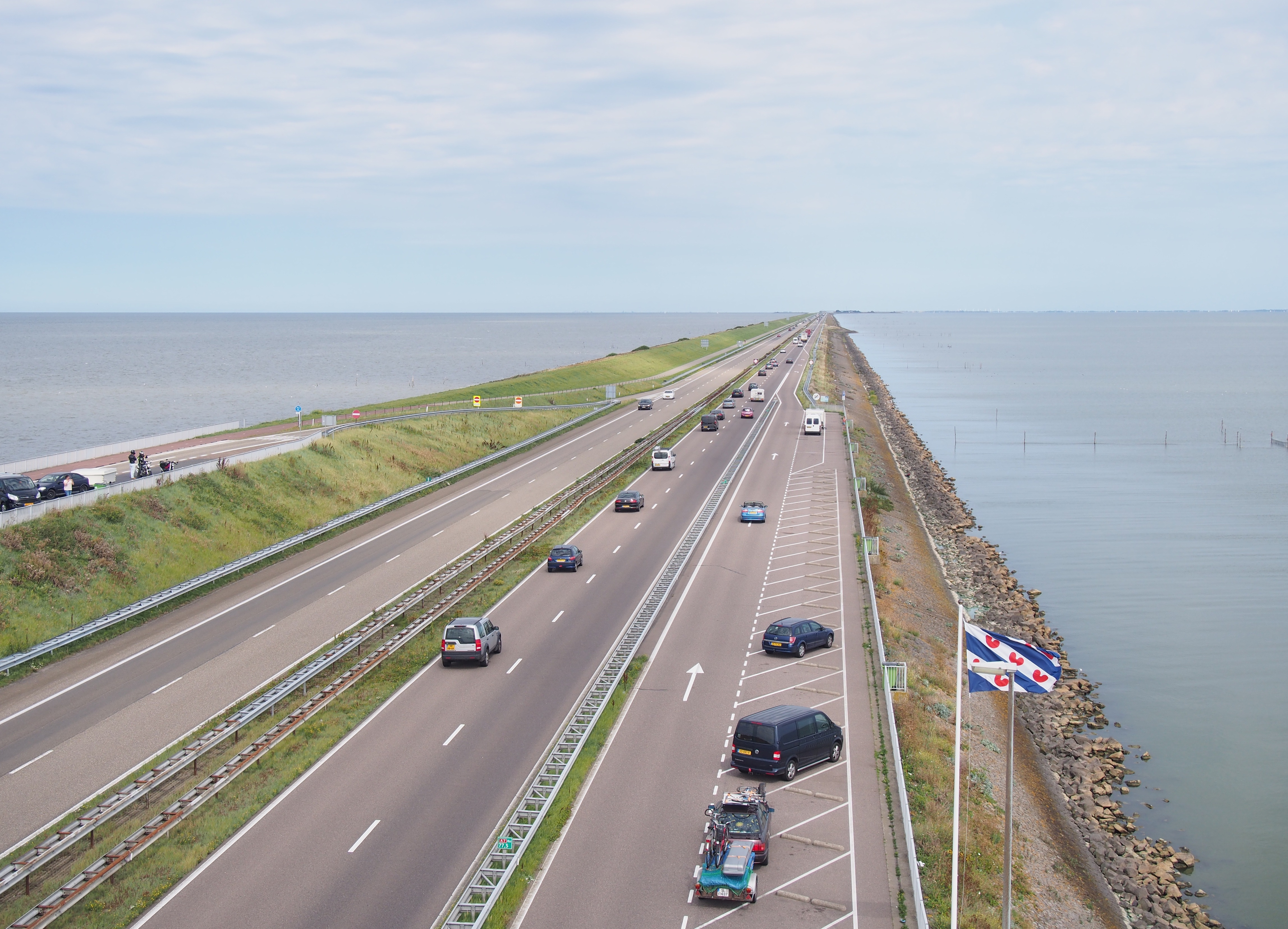
E 22 on the Afsluitdijk

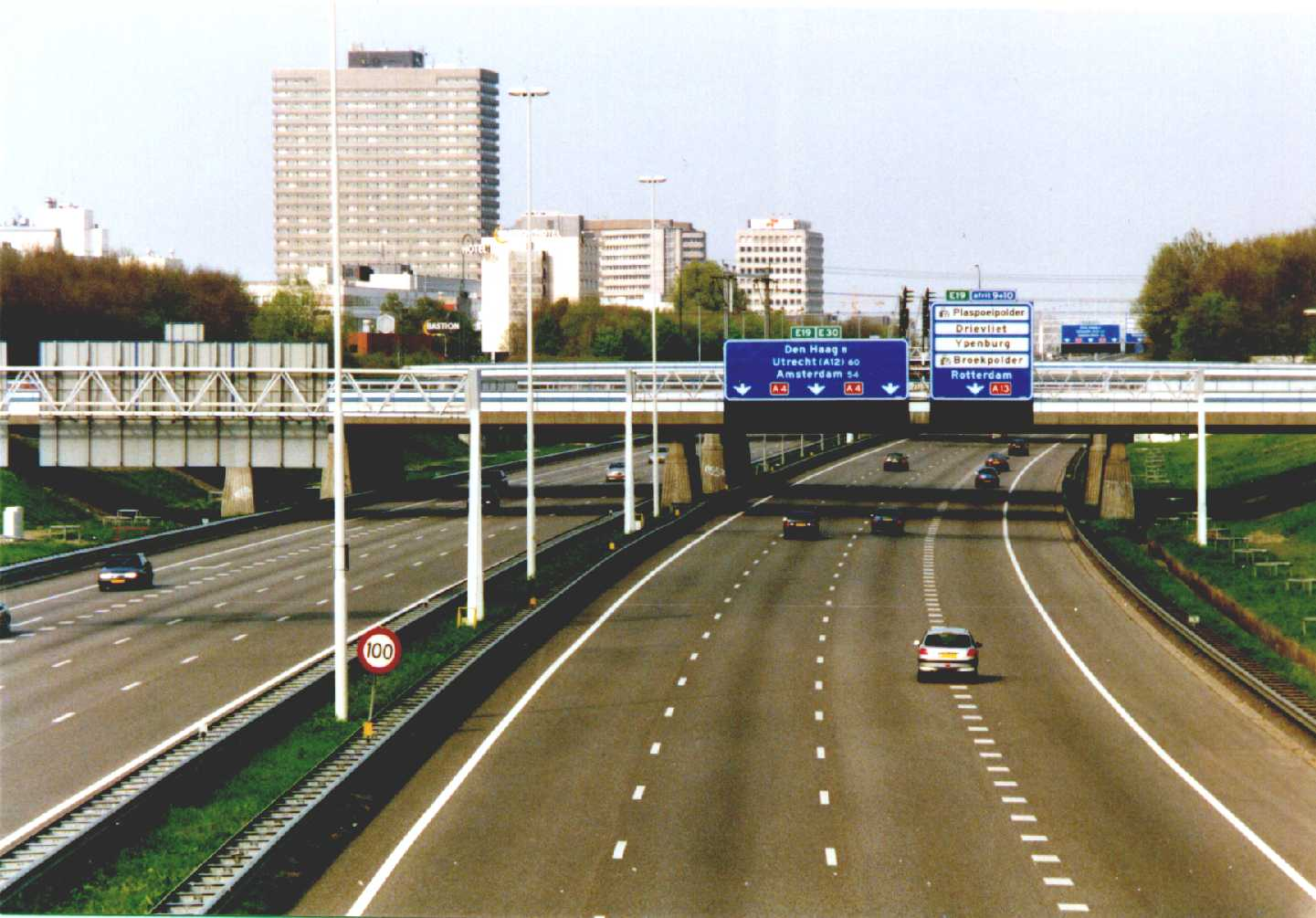
E 19 and E 30 in The Hague

== Class-B European routes ==
Number	Length (km)	Length (mi)	Southern or western terminus	Northern or eastern terminus	Formed	Removed	Notes
E231	40	25	Amsterdam	Amersfoort	1987	current	Was E35 from 1950-1975 and E230 from 1975-1987; follows A1
E232	180	110	Amersfoort	Groningen	1987	current	Was E35 from 1950-1975 and E231 from 1975-1987; follows A28
E233	45	28	Hoogeveen	German border in Emmen	1987	current	Was E232 before 1987; originally ran from Oldenzaal to the German border until 1994; follows A37
E311	65	40	Breda	Utrecht	1987	current	Was E37 until 1987; follows A27
E312	155	96	Vlissingen	Eindhoven	1987	current	Section from Breda to Eindhoven was E38 and Vlissingen to Breda was N97 before 1987; follows A58
E314	35	22	Belgian border in Stein	German border in Simpelveld	—	—	Follows A76

Class-B European routes

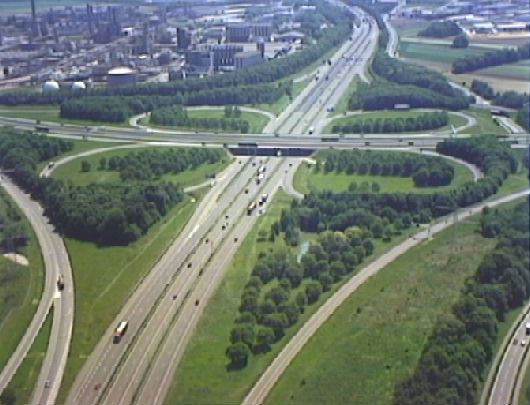
E 314 and E 25 at the Kerensheide interchange

== See also ==
- List of motorways in the Netherlands
