= Mijn Keuken =

Coordinates: 51°31′19.36″N 4°23′16.17″E

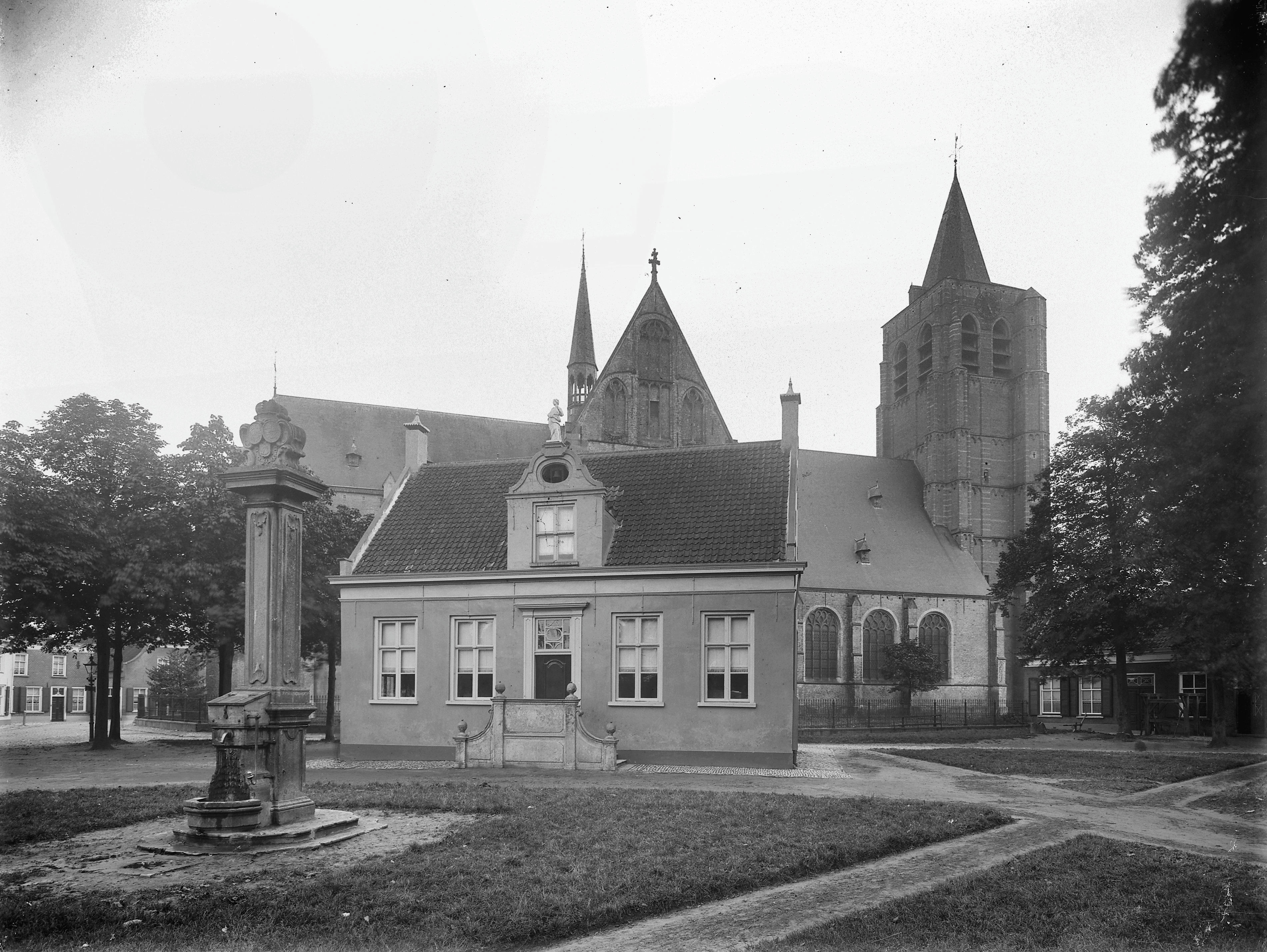
- Interactive map of Mijn Keuken

Restaurant information
- Established: 2005
- Head chef: Pieter Bosters
- Food type: French, International, Regional
- Rating: Michelin Guide
- Location: Markt 1, Wouw, 4724 BK, Netherlands
- Seating capacity: 75

Mijn Keuken is a restaurant in Wouw, Netherlands. It is a fine dining restaurant that was awarded one Michelin star for the period 2010–present.

GaultMillau awarded the restaurant 16 out of 20 points.

Head chef of Mijn Keuken is Pieter Bosters, who opened the restaurant in 2005.

The building that houses the restaurant was once the town hall of the former municipality Wouw. Since 2008, it is a designated wedding location of the municipality Roosendaal.

== See also ==
- List of Michelin starred restaurants in the Netherlands
