= Roosendaal =

- Municipality
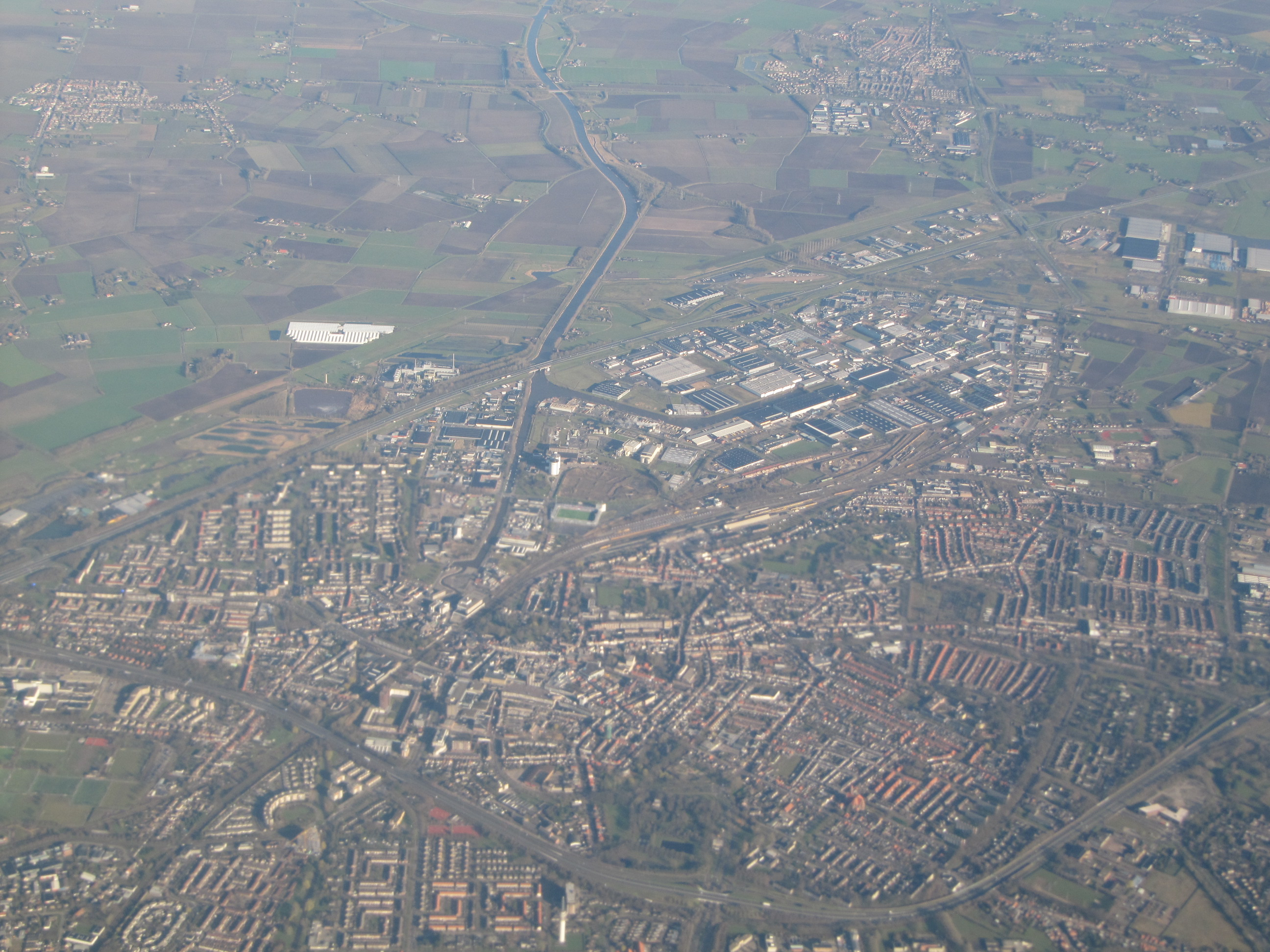
- Aerial view of Roosendaal

- Flag Coat of arms

- Location in North Brabant

- Location within the Netherlands Location within Europe
- Coordinates: 51°32′N 4°27′E
- Country: Netherlands
- Province: North Brabant
- Established: 1 January 1997

Government
  - Body: Municipal council
  - Mayor: Mark Buijs (VVD)

Area
  - Total: 107.16 km^{2} (41.37 sq mi)
  - Land: 106.50 km^{2} (41.12 sq mi)
  - Water: 0.66 km^{2} (0.25 sq mi)
- Elevation: 3 m (9.8 ft)

Population (January 2021)
  - Total: 77,200
  - Density: 725/km^{2} (1,880/sq mi)
- Demonym(s): Roosendaler, Roosendaalder
- Time zone: UTC+1 (CET)
  - Summer (DST): UTC+2 (CEST)
- Postcode: 4700–4709, 4724–4727
- Area code: 0165
- Website: www.roosendaal.nl

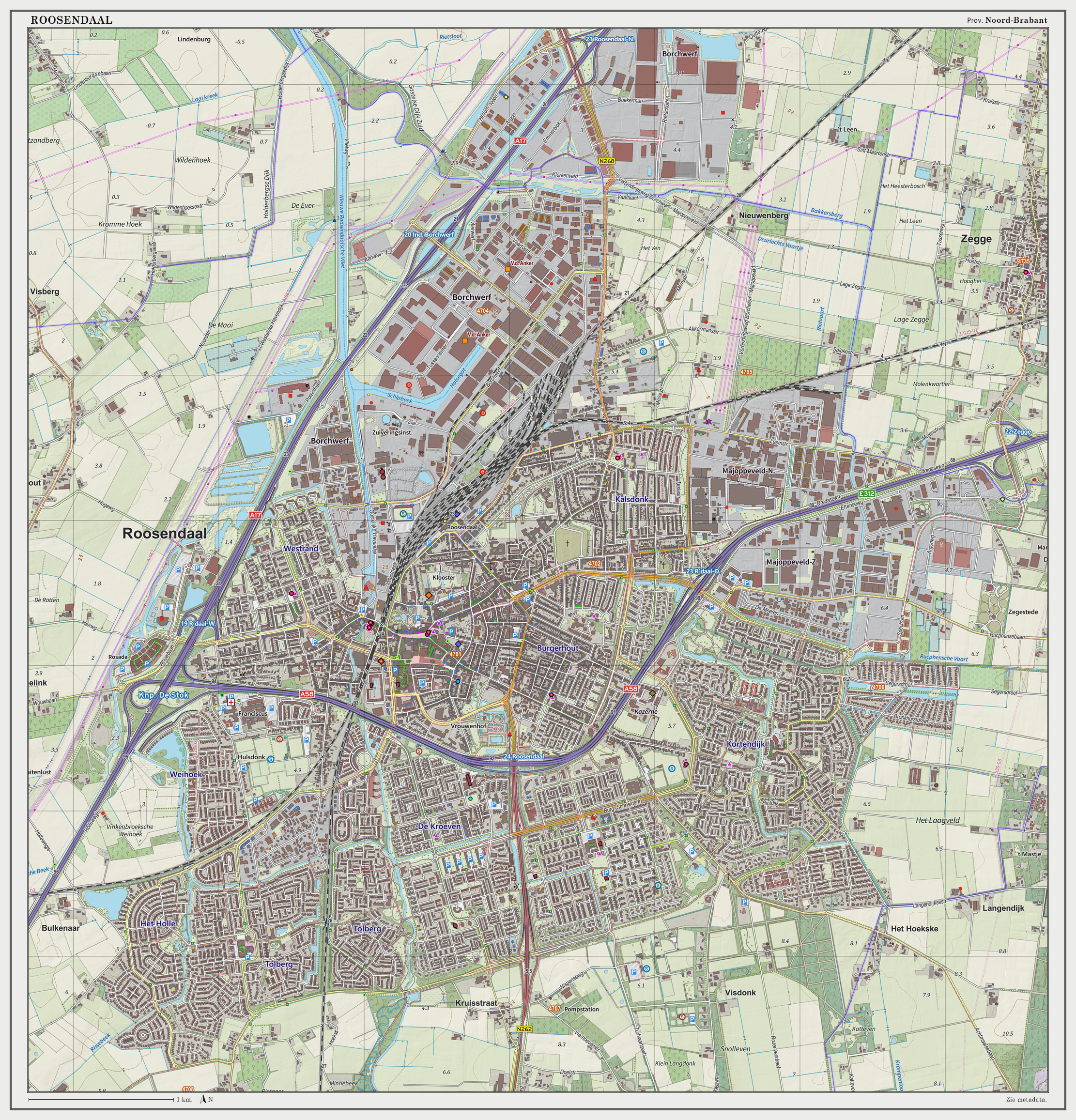
Map of Roosendaal, March 2014

Roosendaal (Dutch pronunciation: [ˈroːzə(n)ˌdaːl]) is both a city and a municipality in the southern Netherlands, in the province of North Brabant.

== Towns in the municipality ==
- Roosendaal (66,760)
- Wouw (4,850)
- Heerle (1,855)
- Nispen (1,800)
- Wouwse Plantage (1,215)
- Moerstraten (625)

== City ==
Under King Louis Bonaparte of the Kingdom of Holland, Roosendaal received city rights in 1809.

Nispen merged with Roosendaal to form the municipality Roosendaal en Nispen. On 1 January 1997 the municipalities Roosendaal en Nispen and Wouw merged into the municipality now simply known as Roosendaal.

=== History ===
Roosendaal goes back to the 12th and 13th century. The name Rosendaele was first mentioned in a document of 1268. Roosendaal was always a part of North Brabant. In the Middle Ages, Roosendaal grew as a result of the turf business, but the Eighty Years' War (1568–1648) put an end to the growth as Roosendaal and Wouw were suffering from itinerant combat troops that plundered and ravaged everything they came across. For decades the countryside of Roosendaal was abandoned.

During the German occupation (World War II), the occupiers operated a subcamp of the Herzogenbusch concentration camp for Jews in the city.

=== Sports ===
The leading football team of Roosendaal is RBC. RBC plays in the Derde Divisie (Fourth Division) of Dutch football. Other known Dutch football clubs are Alliance, DVO '60, BSC, HSC '28, RKVV Rimboe, RKSV Cluzona, RKVV NSV and RKVV Roosendaal.

=== Military ===
The Korps Commandotroepen have their headquarters and main garrison, the Engelbrecht van Nassaukazerne, in Roosendaal. The Royal Marechaussee used to have a brigade in the city. The first brigade was placed in the city on 16 July 1818 and was disbanded on 1 March 1943. On 2 September 1946 the brigade returned to the city, to be disbanded again on 1 September 1989. The Marechaussee would keep a small office on the railway station, due to the station being one of few to directly lead into Belgium.

== Transport ==
- Railway station: Roosendaal

The city serves as a regional railway hub: the Zwolle-Roosendaal Intercity service starts and ends here, the IC from Amsterdam to Vlissingen (Flushing) stops at the station, as did the international Intercity train from Amsterdam to Brussels until 2018, when that train was rerouted via Breda and the HSL-Zuid. There is still an hourly stop-train service to Antwerp.

== Medical care ==
The Bravis Ziekenhuis Roosendaal is the main general hospital for residents of Roosendaal and surrounding areas. Bravis Ziekenhuis offers specialised medical care provided by a broad team of medical specialists. Special units include: Cardiology, Dermatology, Gynaecology, Oncology, Ophthalmology and Intensive Care.

== Events ==
- Carnaval
- Draai van de Kaai cycling race
- Annual "International ABBA Day" – A weekend-long event, normally each April, operated by ABBA's official Fan Club which is based in Roosendaal.

== Notable residents ==
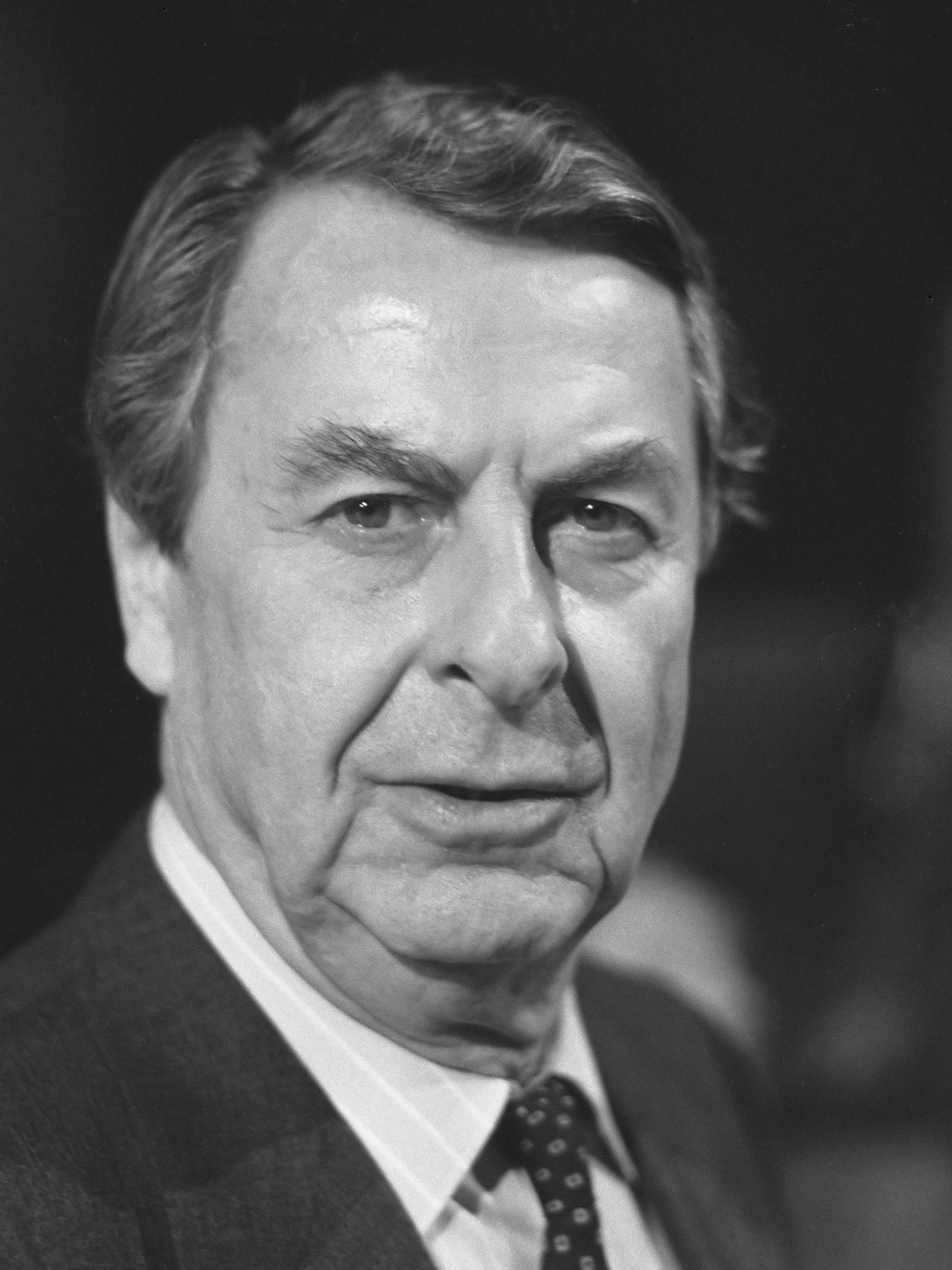
Fons Rademakers, 1986

- Cornelis of Glymes (1458 in Wouw – 1508/1509), Admiral of the Netherlands
- Hendrick Lonck (1568–1634), first Dutch sea captain to reach the New World
- Léon Orthel (1905–1985), classical pianist and composer
- Jean Defraigne (1929–2016), Belgian liberal politician
- Jack Jersey (1941–1997), singer-songwriter and producer of light music
- Jan Ridders (1941–2026), machinist and engineer
- Joe de Bruyn (born 1949), Australian trade union official
- Ad Konings (born 1956), ichthyologist, researches African rift lake cichlids
- Joost Lagendijk (born 1957), politician and former journalist and MEP
- Ben van Beurden (born 1958), CEO, Royal Dutch Shell plc
- Ronny Moorings (born 1961), musician, works with darkwave band Clan of Xymox
- Frans Bauer (born 1973), singer of Dutch Schlager music
- Harmen Fraanje (born 1976), jazz pianist and composer
- Jesse Klaver (born 1986), political leader of Groenlinks

=== Sport ===
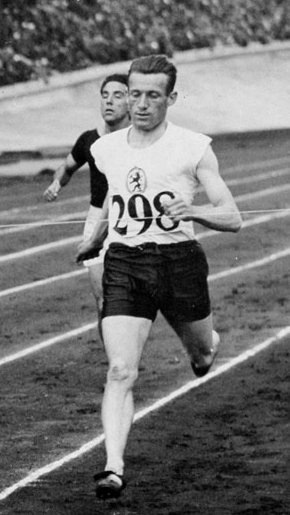
Harry Broos, 1928

- Harry Broos (1898–1954), sprinter, team bronze medallist in the 1924 Summer Olympics
- Antoine Mazairac (1901–1966), cyclist, silver medallist in the 1928 Summer Olympics
- George Knobel (1922–2012), football manager
- Theo Laseroms (1940–1991), footballer, over 400 club caps
- Jacques van Meer (born 1958), retired cyclist, competed at the 1980 Summer Olympics
- Jolanda van Dongen (born 1966), road racing cyclist, national time trial champion, 2003
- Henk Vos (born 1968), footballer with 600 club caps, now a coach
- Ingrid van Lubek (born 1971), triathlete, competed at the 2000 Summer Olympics
- Bram Lomans (born 1975), hockey player, twice team gold medallist at the 1996 and 2000 Summer Olympics
- Tim van Rijthoven (born 1997), tennis player
- Niek van der Velden (born 2000), snowboarder & 2017 Roosendaal Sportsman of the Year

== Gallery ==
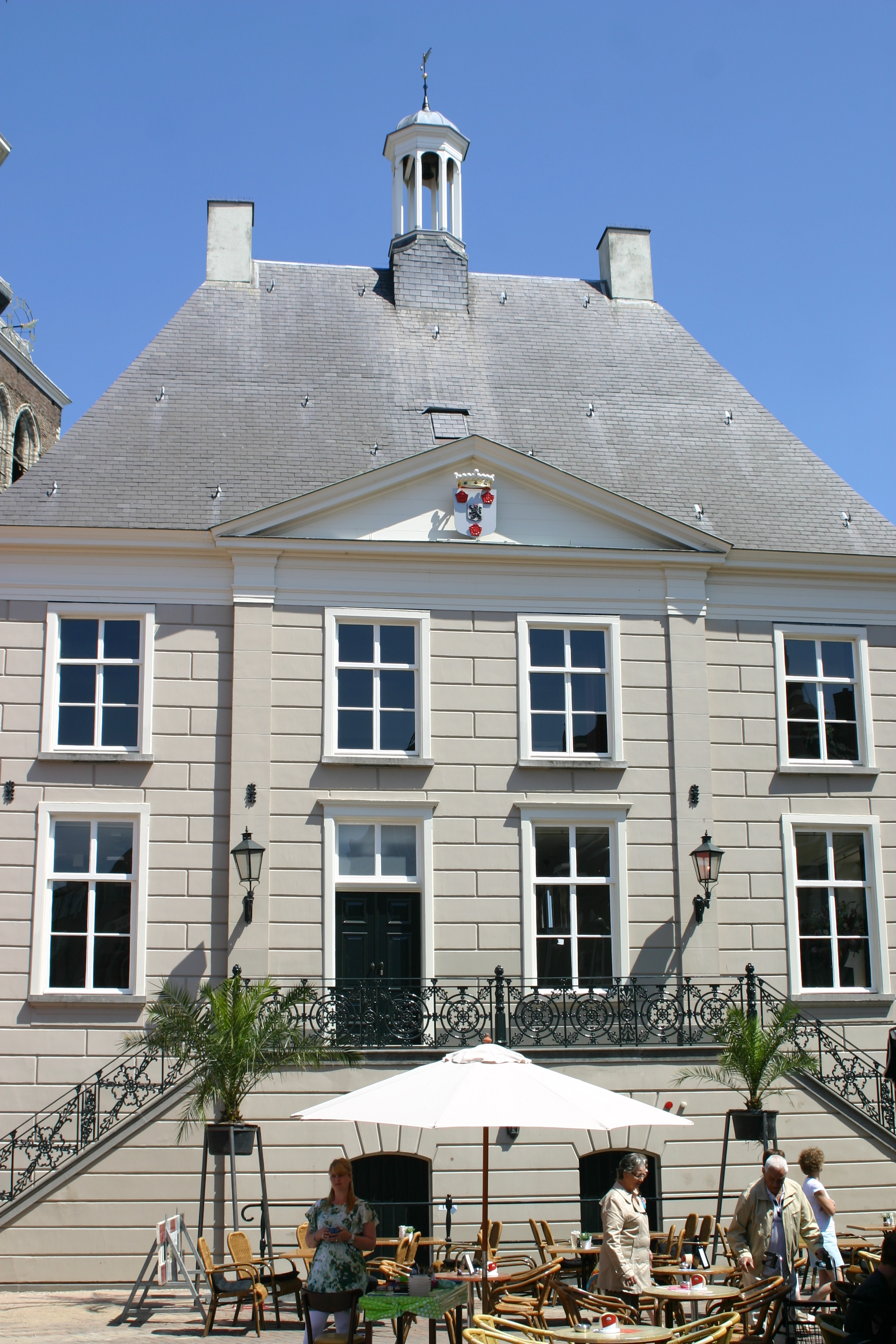
Town hall of Roosendaal

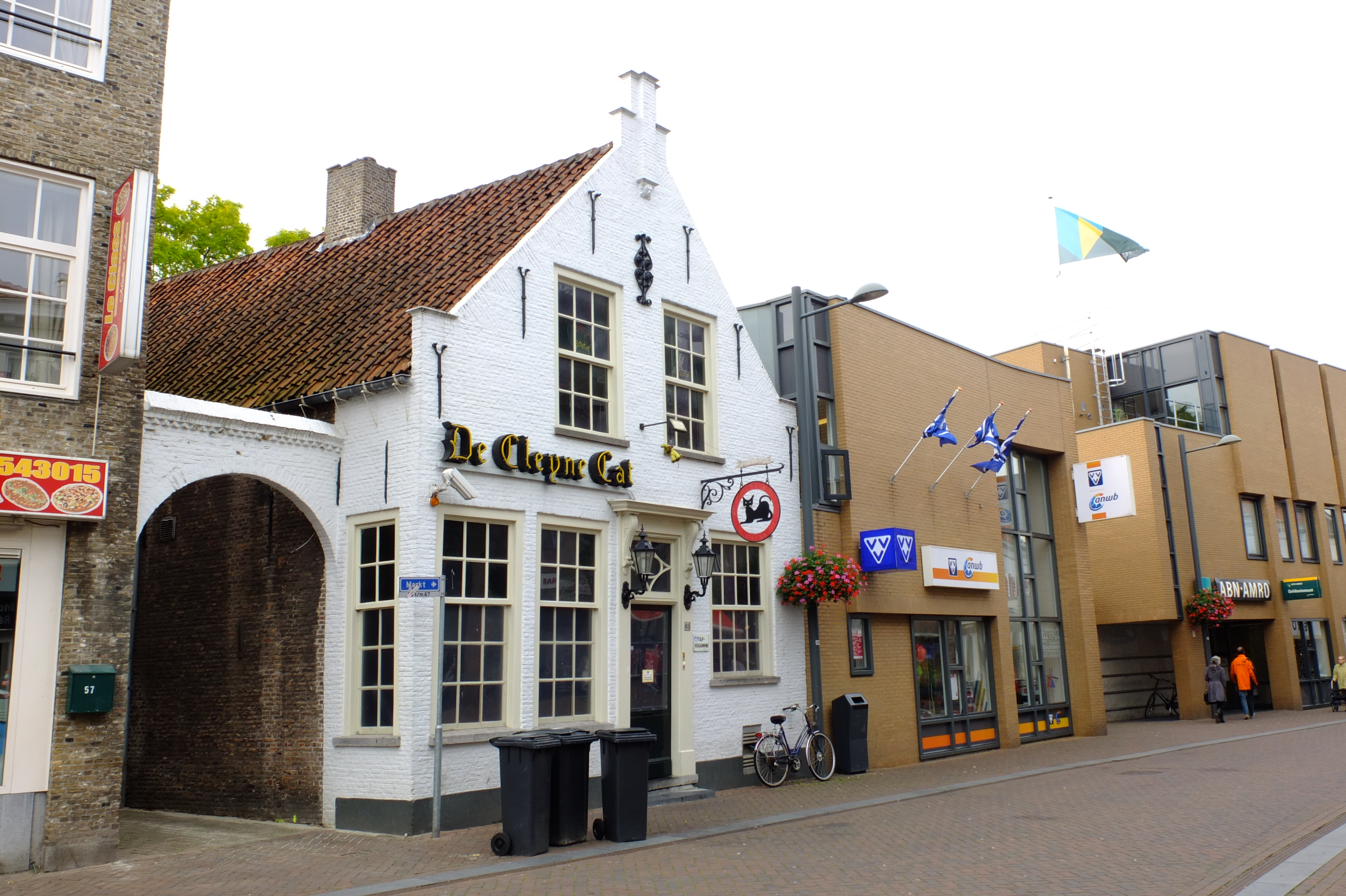
Marketplace of Roosendaal

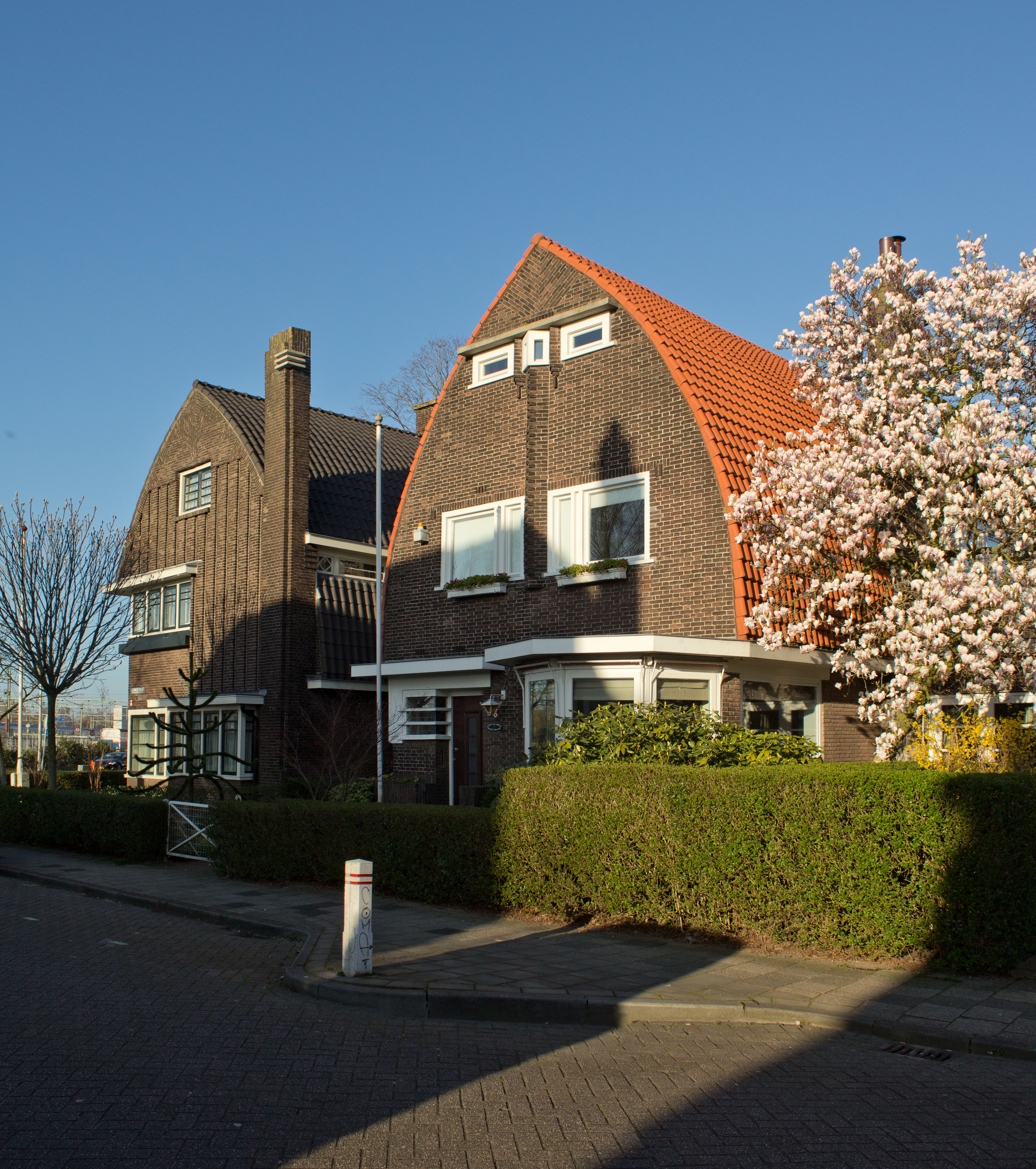
Villa in Amsterdam School style

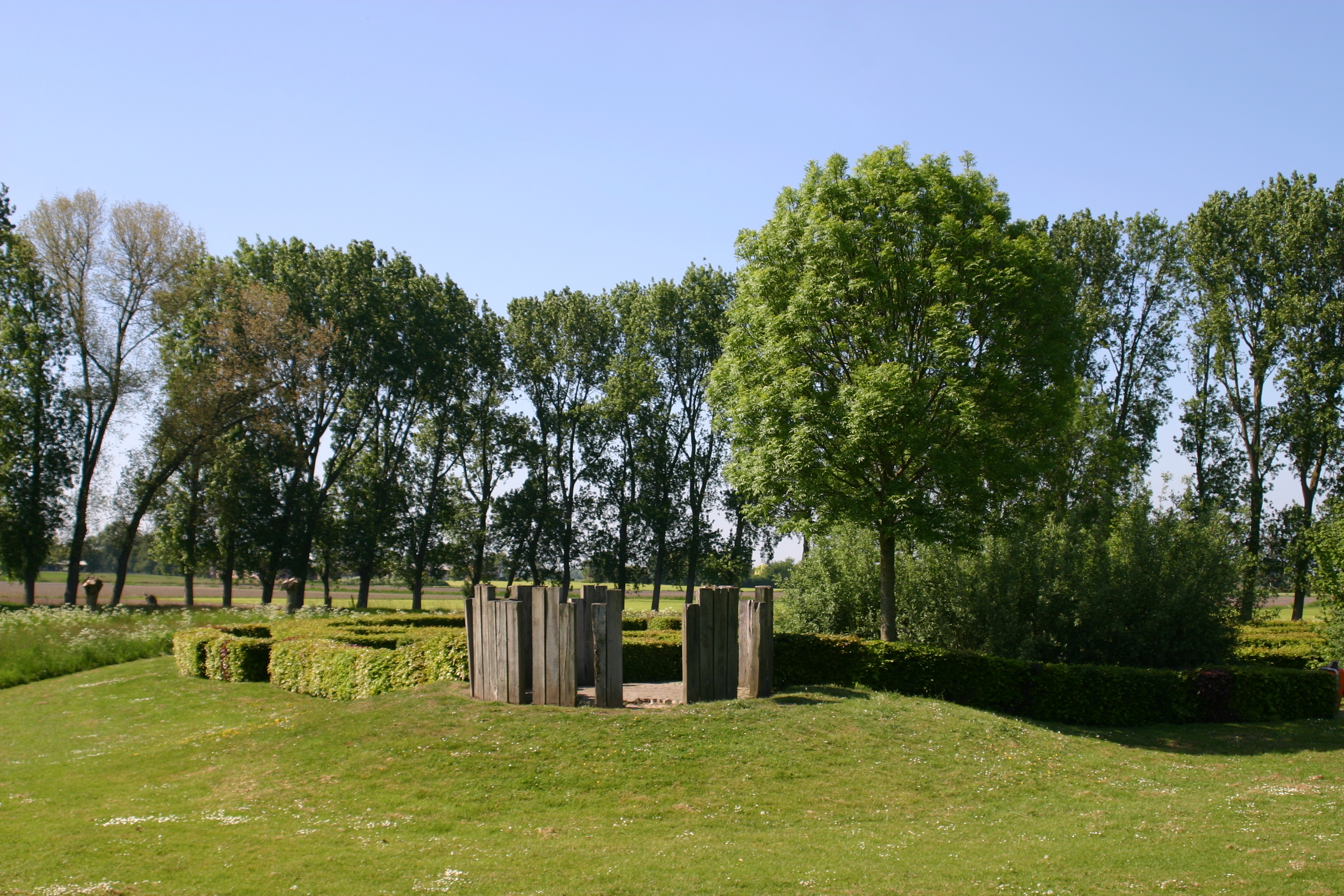
Former Castle of Wouw
