= Jean Defraigne =

Belgian politician (1929–2016)

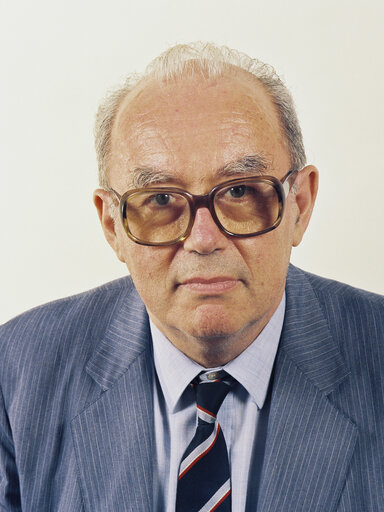

President of the Chamber of Representatives
- In office 18 December 1981 – 10 May 1988
- Preceded by: Joseph Michel
- Succeeded by: Erik Vankeirsbilck
- In office 20 May 1980 – 24 October 1980
- Preceded by: Charles-Ferdinand Nothomb
- Succeeded by: Joseph Michel

Personal details
- Born: Jean Pierre Marie Olivier Germain Defraigne; 19 April 1929 Roosendaal and Nispen, Netherlands (now Roosendaal)
- Died: 15 March 2016 (aged 86)
- Party: Liberal Reformist Party
- Children: Christine Defraigne
- Education: University of Liège

Jean Pierre Marie Olivier Germain Defraigne (French: [ʒɑ̃ pjɛʁ maʁi ɔlivje ʒɛʁmɛ̃ dəfʁɛɲ]; 19 April 1929 – 15 March 2016) was a Belgian liberal politician and minister for the Liberal Reformist Party (PRL).

== Career ==
Defraigne graduated as a doctor of law at the Université de Liège and was a lawyer and alderman in Liège. He was member of the Belgian Chamber of Representatives (1965–1974 and 1977–1989) and senator in the Belgian Senate (1974–1977) for the PRL and was President (1981–1988) of the Belgian Chamber of Representatives of public work (1974–1976). In 1983, Jean Defraigne was appointed as minister of state. From 1989 to 1994 Defraigne served as a Member of the European Parliament, where he sat with the Liberal, Democrat and Reformist Group.

== Sources ==
- Ministries, etc.
- Gouvernement Leo Tindemans II (11 June 1974 – 4 March 1977)

Political offices
Preceded by Charles-Ferdinand Nothomb	President of the Chamber of Representatives; 1980	Succeeded by Joseph Michel
Preceded by Joseph Michel	President of the Chamber of Representatives; 1981–1988	Succeeded by Erik Vankeirsbilck
