= Fontys School of Fine and Performing Arts =

Fine and performing arts school in Tilburg, Netherlands

- Fontys Hogeschool voor de Kunsten
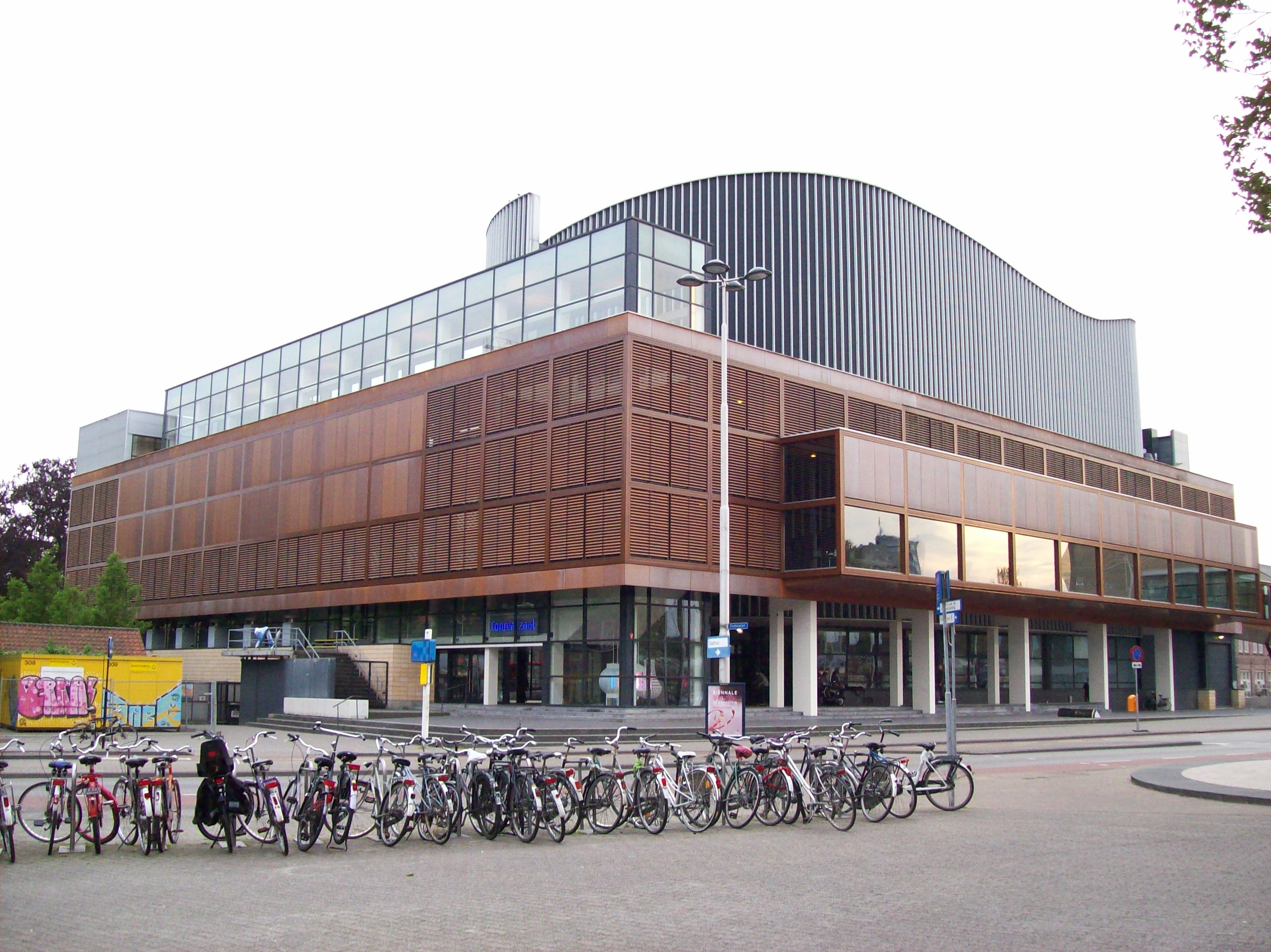
- Type: Vocational university of the arts
- Established: 1918 (as RK Leergangen); 1954 (as Brabants Conservatorium); 1996 (as Fontys)
- Parent institution: Fontys Hogescholen
- Director: Karen Neervoort
- Location: Tilburg, Netherlands; 51°33′14.6″N 5°05′05.7″E
- Website: Official website

The Fontys School of Fine and Performing Arts (Dutch: Fontys Hogeschool voor de Kunsten - FHK) is a Dutch vocational university of the arts located in Tilburg, part of the Fontys Hogescholen. The School originated from the merging of various educational institutions that had existed in different capacity before being united under the Fontys group. Among the precursors of the School was the Brabants Conservatorium, one of the nine conservatoires in the Netherlands.

The earliest predecessors of the School were originally part of the RK Leergangen, a Catholic education institution that settled in Tilburg in 1918 after being originally established in 1912. The various art institutes that form the school came under the Stichting Hoger Onderwijs Zuid-Nederland in 1991, which in 1996 rebranded as Fontys Hogescholen. Since 2005, they have all been located in the same venue in a building known as Kunstkluster ('Art cluster').

Fontys offers various bachelor and master degree programmes in English and in Dutch, across different fields in music, visual arts, dance, theatre and performing arts.

== Academics ==
The School is divided into four sectors: Music, Visual Arts, Dance and Theatre.

=== Music ===
The Music sector is formed by:

- Academy of Music and Performing Arts (AMPA), formerly known as the Conservatorium
- Academie voor Muziekeducatie
- Rockacademie
- Master of Music

==== History ====
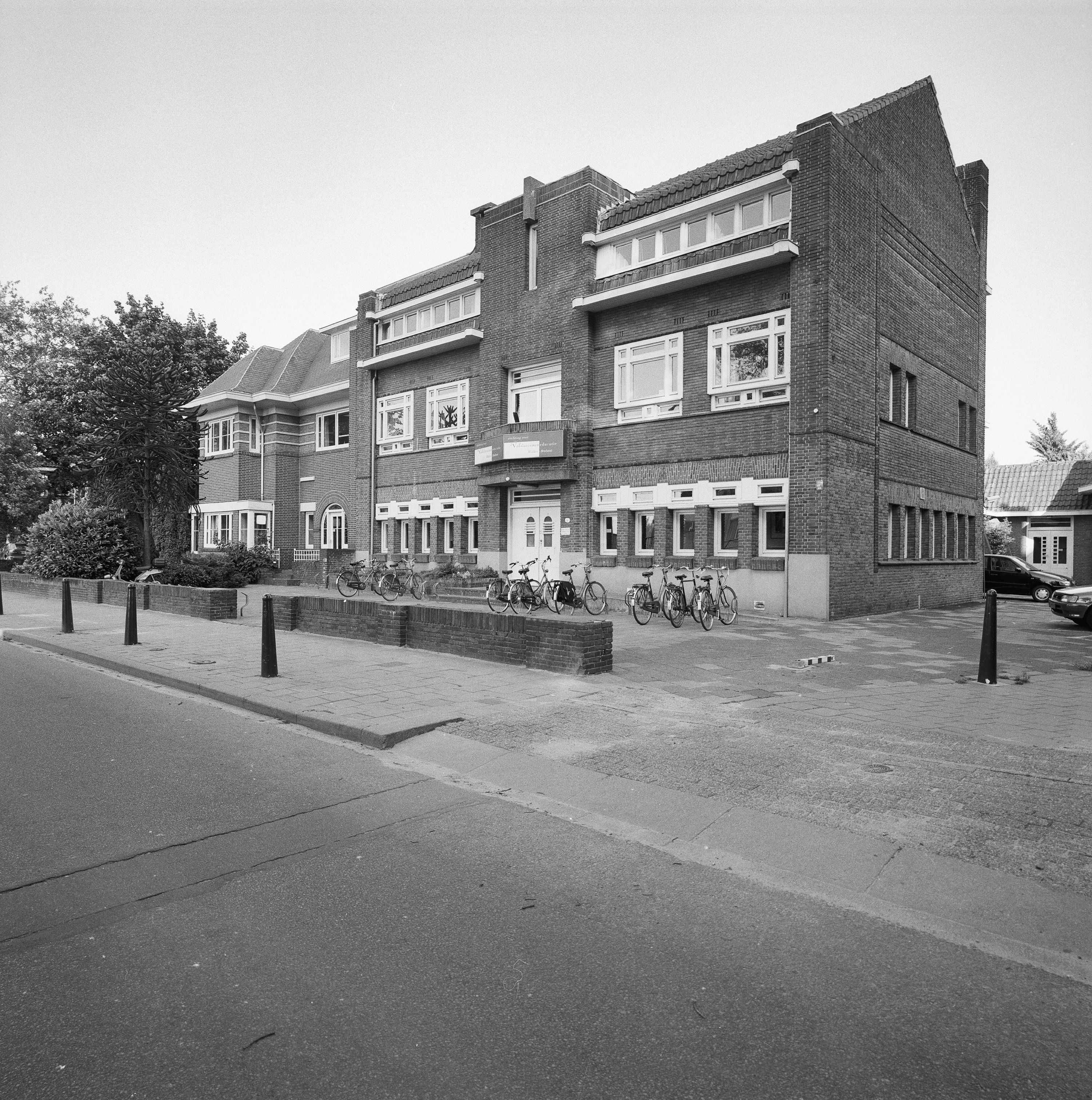
The building on the Bosscheweg where the conservatorium was located between 1929 and 1975

The Conservatorium in Tilburg was established in 1918 by Hendrik Moller under the RK Leergangen, a Catholic educational institution. Originally a private music school for children and amateurs, it grew into a more formal institution under the leadership of pianist and organist Willem van Kalmthout. In 1929, it moved into a building in the Bosscheweg, an area now part of Tivolistraat. In 1954, it became an independent institution under the Stitchting Brabants Conservatorium en Muziekschool. Under director Willem Goedhard, the Conservatoire, now known as Brabants Conservatorium, obtained formal recognition from the government. The school grew as Goedhard managed to attract several talented teachers from the Eastern Bloc.

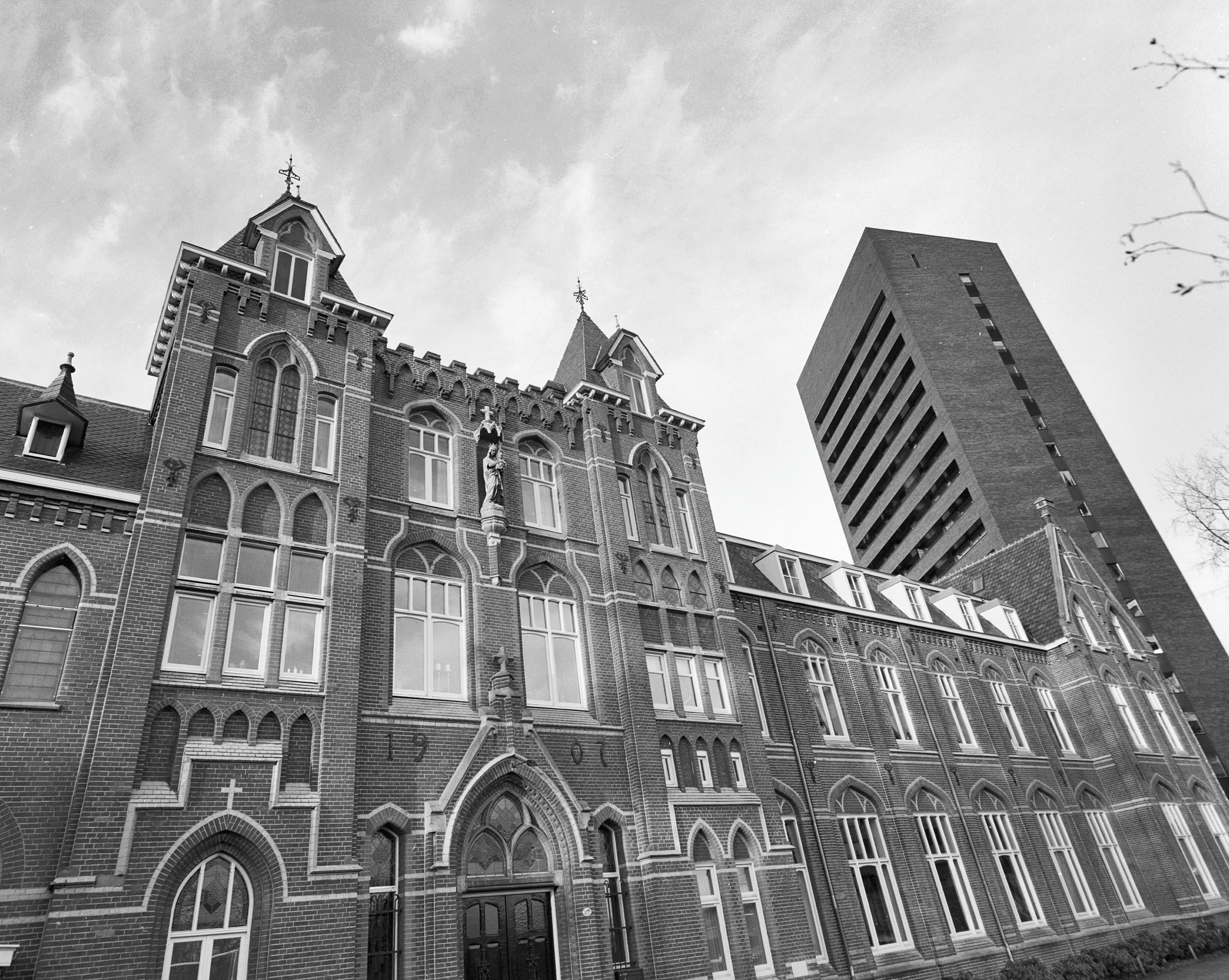
The Cenakel, where the Conservatorium was located between 1975 and 1996

In 1971, the Brabants Conservatorium moved to the former monastery on the Kampenbaan, known as the Cenakel, together with the Dansacademie. Under the leadership of Andries Clement, who became director in 1975, the conservatoire grew to over 500 students. In 1984, it returned under the umbrella of the RK Leergangen, which in 1991 merged with other institutions into the Stichting Hoger Onderwijs Zuid-Nederland, known from 1996 as Fontys Hogescholen.

As the facilities at the Cenakel were deemed unsuitable for the rising student numbers, in 1996 the Fontys Conservatorium moved, together with the Dansacademie, into the so-called Kunstkluster, a new building designed by Jo Coenen on the Bisschop Zwijsenstraat. In 2005, they were joined by the Rockacademie, Academie voor Theater, Beeldende Vorming and Architectuur en stedebow to bring all sectors of the Fontys School of Fine and Performing Arts under the same roof. In 2017, the Conservatorium changed names to Academy of Music and Performing Arts (AMPA), coinciding with the switch to offering courses fully taught in English.

The Rockacademie was established in 1999 by Bertus Borgers and Gerard Boontje as an independent institution and it was originally located in the Veemarktkwartier, near the pop music venue 013, before moving to the 'Kunstkluster' in 2005.

==== Former Directors ====
- Willem van Kalmthout (1918-1943)
- Phons Dusch (1944-1955)
- Willem Goedhart (1955-1964)
- Louis Toebosch (1965-1972)
- Andries Clement (1975-1994)
- Marcel Pinkse (1995-2000)
- Martien van Woerkom (2001-2004)
- Jan Wirken (2004-2011)
- Raf De Keninck (2012-2019)

==== Courses of studies ====
The AMPA currently offers a Bachelor of Music taught in English, with programmes both in classical music and jazz. Next to instrument and ensemble playing, emphasis is also given to artistic research, entrepreneurship, interdisciplinarity, international connectedness and self-management. Additionally, the AMPA offers a pre-bachelor program as well as a course for musicians aged 8 to 18 known as the Young Musicians Academy.

The Academie voor Muziekeducatie offers a bachelor programme taught in Dutch, focused on teacher training for musicians and preparing the students for a career in music education.

The Rockacademie offers a Dutch-taught bachelor programme in pop music, in which the students can experience different domains such as music, business, education and sound & music technology and ultimately specialise as performer, session musician, business manager, skills and bandcoach, audio engineer.

The Master of Music is a postgraduate programme for musicians. The characteristic of this programme is that it is highly personalised: each students receives a two-year scholarship and must use it to tailor their curriculum in accordance with their artistic and professional needs. They can use their budget to take courses at Fontys as well as at other institutions or with independent artists.

=== Visual Arts ===
The Visual Arts sector (Dutch: Sector Beeldende Vorming) is formed by:

- Academie voor Beeldende Vorming (ABV)
- Academy of Art, Communicatie and Design (ArtCoDe)
- Master of Architecture and Master of Urbanism
- Master Kunsteducatie,

==== History ====
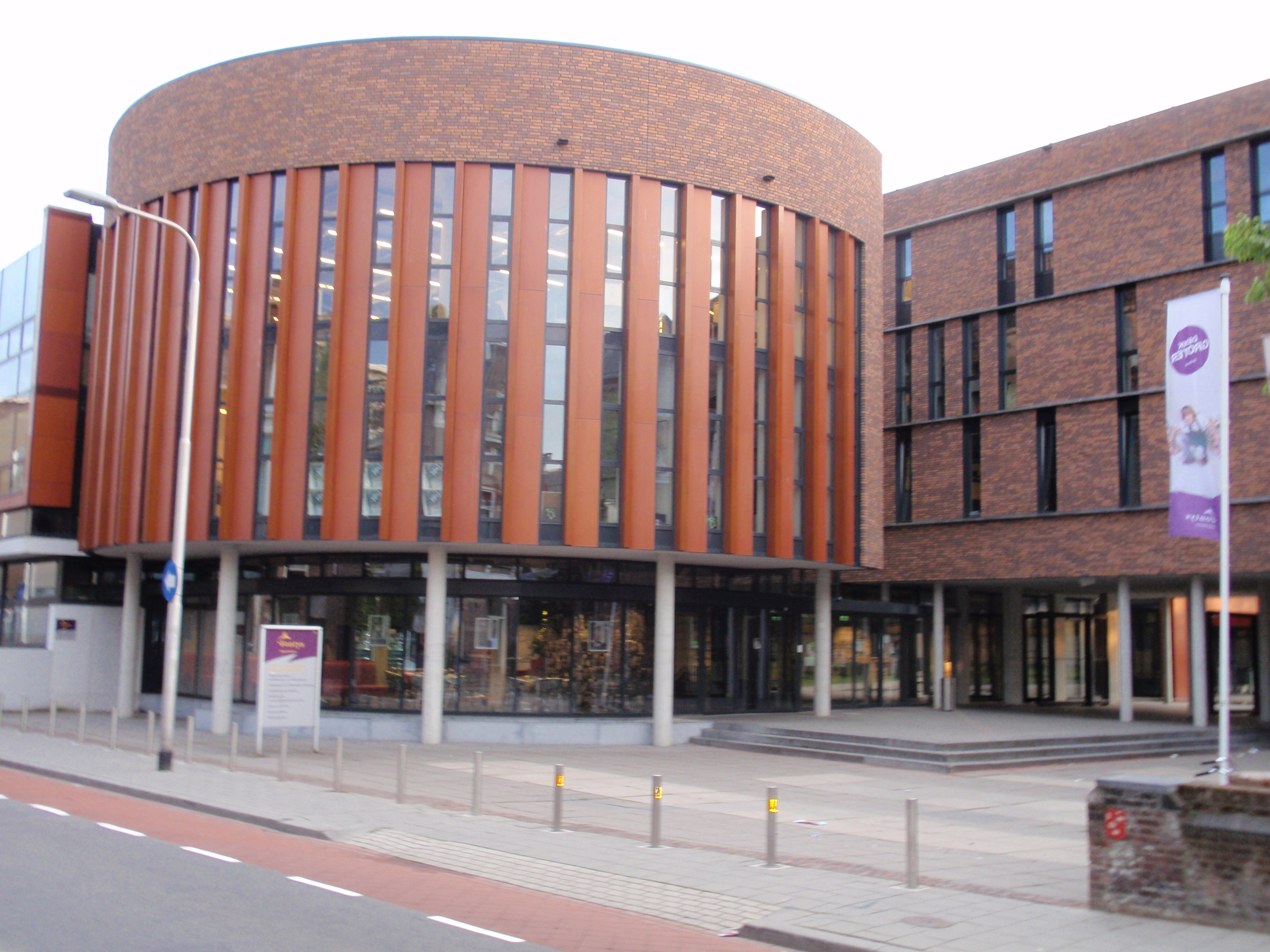
The 'Kunstkluster', where all Fontys School of Arts programmes are located since 2005

When Hendrik Moller established the RK Leergangen in 1912, it included a drawing course. Originally located in Amsterdam, the RK Leergangen moved to Den Bosch in 1913 and ultimately to Tilburg in 1918. After expanding with a section in architecture, the institution took the name of Academie voor Beeldende en Technische Vakken and from 1920, Academie voor Beeldende en Bouwende Kunsten. From the beginning it offered a course that combined teaching training with autonomous artistic expression.

At the end of the 1950s, the architecture department separated from the institution, which then took the name Academie voor Opleiding tot Teken- en Handvaardigheidsleraren. In 1972 the school changed names again to Academie voor Leraren Tekenen en Handenarbeid and gained its current name, Academie voor Beeldende Vorming, in 1978. When the school had moved to Tilburg in 1918, it was originally based in the Lange Schijfstraat and later moved to the Vincentiusstraat, to the Bosscheweg (now Tivolistraat) and then to the Professor Cobbenhagenlaan.

The school had in the meantime become part of the Stichting Hoger Onderwijs Zuid-Nederland, known from 1996 as Fontys Hogescholen. Following the impetus to group all arts education in Tilburg under the same roof, the ABV moved to the Kunstkluster on the Bisschop Zwijsenstraat in 2005.

==== Courses of studies ====
The Academie voor Beeldende Vorming offers a Dutch-taught bachelor programme focused on teacher training in the field of arts and design. Students learn art practice in different fields of the visual arts while training to teach art in different context. They prepare for a career in art education, in schools, museums and more.

The Academy of Art, Communicatie and Design offers a Dutch-taught bachelor program in design. Students experience different fields of design, from graphic design to spatial design, specialising in one by the end of the course.

At postgraduate level, Fontys offers three master's in Art Education, Architecture and Urbanism. The Master Kunsteducatie (Master in Art Education) is offered in Dutch over two years, while the two MSc programmes in Architecture and Urbanism are offered in English over four years. All three are offered part time and are oriented towards combining work and study at the same time.

=== Dance ===
The Dance sector is formed by:

- Dance Academy
- Academie voor Danseducatie
- Master of Choreography.

==== History ====
The Dansacademie was established in Tilburg in 1965 and has since the beginning been closely associated to the Brabants Conservatorium. In 1975 it moved to the Cenakel on the Kampenbaan, formerly a monastery, together the Conservatorium. Both institutions moved to the new Kunstkluster on the Bisschop Zwijsenstraat in 1996.

==== Courses of studies ====
The Dance Academy offers a Bachelor of Dance programme taught in English, with three different specialisations after a shared first year: two profiles in Dance Arts in Context, (Contemporary and Contemporary Urban), and one in Choreography. The training and research programme includes a wide range of performance and movement practices. Students are encouraged to be creators of and performers in their own work.

The Academie voor Danseducatie offers a Dutch-taught bachelor preparing students for a career in Dance education.

The Master in Choreography is jointly offered by Fontys School of Fine and Performing Arts together with Codarts University of the Arts in Rotterdam. At this part time programme offered in English across Tilburg and Rotterdam, students are supposed to carry out research into questions initiating from their current practice.

=== Theatre ===
The Theatre sector is formed by:

- Academie voor Theater
- Academie voor Muziek- en musicaltheater
- Academy of Circus and Performing Arts (ACaPA)
- Master Performing in Public Spaces.

==== History ====
The Academie voor Theater traces its origins back to the Academie voor Drama established in Eindhoven by Ad Overweel in 1986, under the auspices of Hogeschool Eindhoven. This academy was originally located in a former monastery by the river Dommel in Eindhoven. Originally, the Academie had three areas of study: acting, directing, and teaching. After a few years, the school profiled itself towards teacher training specifically, with a program focused on 'docerend theatermaking' ('Teaching Theatremaking'). After being incorporated in Fontys Hogescholen, the school moved to Tilburg and became part of the Fontys School of Fine and Performing Arts in 2005.

==== Courses of studies ====
The bachelor programme in 'Docerend Theatermaker' ('Teaching Theatremaking') is offered in Dutch and combines acting and theatre practice with Dramaturgy and teacher training.

Two bachelor programmes are offered in the field of musical theatre, one focused on music and the other on dance. Both are taught in Dutch.

The Academy of Circus and Performance Art offers a bachelor programme taught in English, training students in the profession of circus performer across a variety of circus skills.

== Building ==
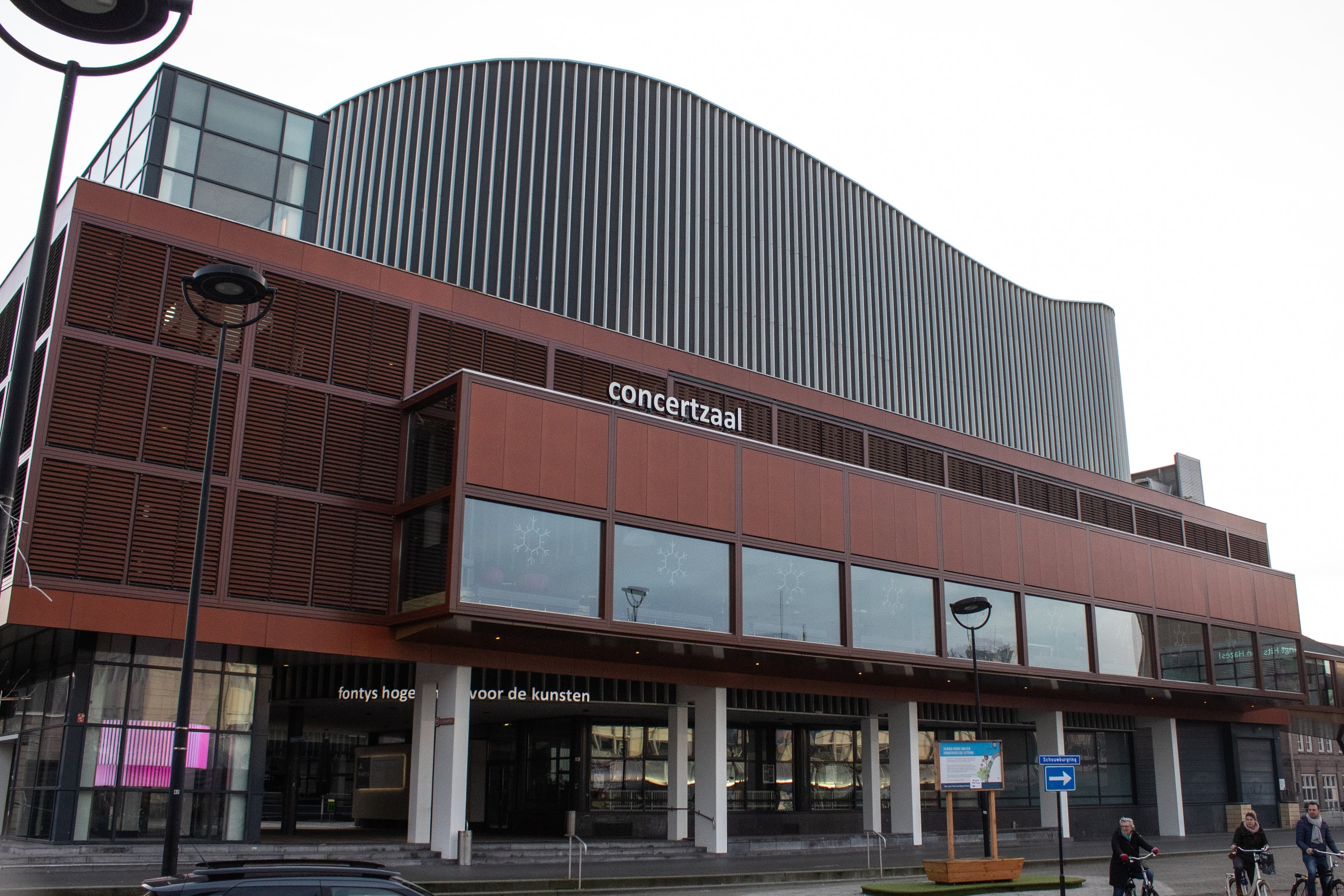

The Fontys School of Fine and Performing Arts is located in a building on the Bisschop Zwijsenstraat, at the southern side of the Tilburg city centre. Known as Kunstkluster ('Art cluster'), this building includes a concert hall and is connected with a footbridge to the Stadsschouwburg, designed by Bernard Bijvoet and Gerard Holt in 1961. The Kunstkluster was developed in two phases. The first phase, completed in 1996, included the Concert Hall, the Conservatorium and the Dansacademie. The second phase was opened on 4 November 2005, when all other institutions previously located around Tilburg merged under the same roof.

Designed by architect Jo Coenen, the new building incorporated existing elements, such as a 19th-century former monastery with an organ hall and library as well as a neo-Gothic former chapel built in 1895. The building is designed around a courtyard known as Muzentuin ('Garden of the Muses'). The various sections of the building have different architectural styles, but they are all connected through a long corridor along which the entrances to classrooms, rehearsal studios and other spaces are placed. The northern entrance is hidden behind a patio-shaped square, where the entrance to the Concert Hall is also located.

The Concert Hall, with its 840 seats, is a distinct feature as it rises in a curved shape above the square building.
