= Bachelor of Dance =

A Bachelor of Dance, often abbreviated as B.Dance, BFA (Dance), BCA (Dance), BDanceEd, or BA (Dance), is an undergraduate academic degree awarded by a college, university, or conservatory upon completion of a program of study in dance.

Students interested in pursuing a professional career in dance can apply for a BA or BFA Dance program.

== Application Requirements ==
In addition to submitting the application, dancers will have to provide proof of their dance experience, and in most cases, participate in an in-person audition.

Long Island University's BFA program requires undergraduate applicants to have a minimum GPA of 3.0.

In Australia, the Bachelor of Dance is offered at the following universities under different names:

- University of New South Wales - Bachelor of Arts (Dance Studies); Bachelor of Arts (Dance)/Bachelor of Education.
- Macquarie University - Bachelor of Arts (majoring in Dance).
- Queensland University of Technology - Bachelor of Fine Arts (Dance Performance).
- TAFE South Australia - Bachelor of Dance Performance.
- University of Melbourne (through the Victorian College of the Arts) - Bachelor of Fine Arts (Dance); Master of Fine Arts (Dance); Master of Choreography.
- Academy of Music and Performing Arts - Bachelor of Dance; Associate of Dance (Sydney).
- Deakin University - Bachelor of Arts (Dance), can be combined with a Bachelor of Science, Bachelor of Teaching (Secondary), or Bachelor of Laws.
- Edith Cowan University (through the Western Australian Academy of Performing Arts) - Bachelor of Arts (Dance); Advanced Diploma of Performing Arts (Dance).

== List of Universities Offering a Bachelor of Dance in The United States ==
University	City	State	Type	Degree(s)
University of Oklahoma	Norman	OK	Public	Ballet Pedagogy, B.F.A.; Ballet Performance, B.F.A; Modern Performance, B.F.A; Dance History Minor; Master of Fine Arts in Dance
Butler University	Indianapolis	IN	Private	Dance Pedagogy, B.A.; Arts Administration, B.S.; Dance Performance, B.F.A
University of Utah	Salt Lake City	UT	Public	Ballet, B.F.A.; Modern Dance, B.F.A.; Modern Dance Teaching, B.F.A.; Modern Dance Minor; Master of Fine Arts in Ballet; Master of Fine Arts in Modern
University of California, Irvine	Irvine	CA	Public	Dance, B.A.; Dance Performance, B.F.A.; Choreography, B.F.A; Dance Minor; Master of Fine Arts in Dance
New York University	New York City	NY	Private	Dance, B.F.A.; Master of Arts in Teaching Dance; Master of Arts in Teaching Dance in the Professions; Master of Arts in Teaching Dance in the Professions: ABT Pedagogy; Master of Arts in Teaching Dance in the Professions: Dances of the African Diaspora
University of Southern California	Los Angeles	CA	Private	Dance, B.F.A.; Dance Minor; Hip-Hop, Street, and Social Dance Forms Minor; Choreography for Screen and Stage Minor; Dance in Entertainment Minor
Fordham University	New York City	NY	Private	Dance, B.F.A
Florida State University	Tallahassee	FL	Public	Dance, B.F.A.; Dance, M.F.A.; Dance: Studio and Related Studies, M.A.; Dance: Returning Professionals, M.F.A.; Dance: Combined Degree Pathway, B.F.A, M.A.
