= Roosendaal en Nispen =

Coordinates: 51.50543°N 4.462337°E

Roosendaal en Nispen was a municipality in the Dutch province of North Brabant. It included the villages of Roosendaal and Nispen.

In 1997, the municipality merged with Wouw. As the town of Roosendaal had become by far the largest in the new municipality, the name of the new municipality became simply "Roosendaal".

== People from Roosendaal en Nispen ==
- Engelbert II of Nassau (1451–1504), Lord of Breda, Lek, Diest, Roosendaal, Nispen and Wouw.
- Jean Defraigne (born 1929), Belgian politician
- Ingrid van Lubek (born 1971), Dutch athlete
- Q.S. Serafijn (born 1960), Dutch conceptual artist and author
- Stars Over Foy, Dutch music producer
