= Pieter Elbers =

Airline executive

- Born: 11 May 1970 (age 56); Schiedam, Netherlands
- Education: Fontys University of Applied Sciences University of Amsterdam
- Years active: 1992–present
- Known for: President and CEO of KLM
- Spouse: Marjolein Elbers

Pieter Elbers (born 11 May 1970) is a Dutch airline executive who was most recently the CEO of IndiGo. He had been president and CEO of the Netherlands' flag carrier airline, KLM, from 2014 until his appointment as CEO of IndiGo in 2022.

Elbers resigned as CEO of IndiGo on 10 March 2026.

== Early years ==
Elbers was born in Schiedam, in the province of South Holland. He attended elementary school at De Singel Primo Schiedam and studied at Fontys University of Applied Sciences in Venlo where he received a Bachelor in Logistics Management. Afterwards, he did a master's degree in Business Administration at the Open University of the Netherlands. He also studied abroad in New York City and Beijing.

== Career ==
Elbers graduated at Fontys University located in Venlo.

Elbers started his career with KLM in 1992 as supervisor aircraft loading at the Schiphol hub, followed by a number of managerial positions in The Netherlands as well as abroad for six years, amongst which those of general/sales manager in Japan, Greece and Italy. After he returned to The Netherlands, he became SVP network & alliances, before he joined the board of managing directors in 2011 as chief operating officer.

Elbers was one of the pivotal members of KLM that led them to signing with airline alliance SkyTeam. He is a member of the executive committee of the Air France-KLM Group. Furthermore, he is a member of the supervisory board of Marfo B.V. In addition, he is a member of the board of the Confederation of Netherlands Industry and Employers.

On 15 October 2014 KLM Royal Dutch Airlines announced that Elbers had been appointed by the KLM supervisory board as president and chief executive officer of KLM, replacing Camiel Eurlings. During his time in office, the Dutch state purchased a 14% stake in the company in 2019, in an effort to protect the Netherlands' interests. In early 2022, KLM announced that Elbers would not serve a third term and instead resign by May 2023.

In June 2022, IndiGo announced the appointment of Elbers as its new CEO, replacing Ronojoy Dutta, who had retired. On 6 September 2022, Elbers formally took charge of IndiGo as the CEO.

On 7 December 2025, the Indian government civil aviation watchdog sent the notice to IndiGo CEO Pieter Elbers, giving him 24 hours to respond and say why regulatory action - which can include penalties and suspension of officials - should not be taken against the airline. This notice was issued to him as the Indigo airlines had to cancel many flights in December 2025, due to a new rule that was issued in 2024 and was to be implemented in December 2025.

He resigned from IndiGo on 10 March 2026.

== See also ==
- IndiGo
