= Elly Blanksma-van den Heuvel =

Dutch politician (born 1959)

Member of the House of Representatives of the Netherlands
- In office 30 November 2006 – 19 September 2012

Personal details
- Born: Petronella Johanna Maria Godefrida van den Heuvel; 24 September 1959 (age 66) Helmond, Netherlands
- Party: Christian Democratic Appeal (Christen-Democratisch Appèl - CDA)
- Spouse: Married
- Education: Fontys University of Applied Sciences (B.A., Business economics)
- Occupation: Politician, banking manager
- Website: (in Dutch) Christian Democratic Appeal website

Petronella Johanna Maria Godefrida Blanksma-van den Heuvel (born 24 September 1959, Helmond), known as Elly Blanksma-van den Heuvel, is a Dutch politician and former banking manager. As a member of the Christian Democratic Appeal (Christen-Democratisch Appèl) she was an MP from 30 November 2006 to 19 September 2012, focusing on finance, economics, innovation and agriculture. Since 1 November 2012 she has been mayor of Helmond.

Blanksma-van den Heuvel was born in the province of North Brabant and studied business economics at Fontys University of Applied Sciences. She worked in several management positions at the Rabobank.

From 1987 to 1995 she was a member of the States-Provincial of North Brabant. She was also a member of the national as well of the North Brabant party executive. From November 2006 to September 2012 she served as an MP in the Dutch House of Representatives. She was spokeswoman in the area of finance on behalf of the CDA parliamentary group.

== Decorations ==
- In 2012, she was named Knight of the Order of Orange-Nassau.
