= Henk Vos =

Dutch footballer and coach

Personal information
- Full name: Hendricus Johannes Petrus Vos
- Date of birth: 5 June 1968 (age 58)
- Place of birth: Wouw, Netherlands
- Height: 1.86 m (6 ft 1 in)
- Position: Forward

Youth career
- 1974–1981: RKSV Cluzona
- 1981–1984: RBC

Senior career*
Years	Team	Apps	(Gls)
1984–1985	RBC	12	(2)
1985–1986	PSV	0	(0)
1986–1987	Willem II	14	(1)
1987	RBC	12	(6)
1987–1988	FC Eindhoven	4	(0)
1988–1990	Germinal Ekeren	40	(17)
1990–1993	Standard Liège	78	(23)
1991	→ Metz (loan)	16	(2)
1993–1996	Sochaux	84	(26)
1996–1999	Feyenoord	81	(15)
2000–2001	FC Den Bosch	30	(10)
2000–2003	RBC	78	(33)
2003–2004	NAC Breda	26	(6)
2004	TOP Oss	18	(3)
2005	Germinal Beerschot	8	(2)
2005	Racing Mechelen	14	(3)
2006–2009	RBC	85	(11)
2010	KFC Meerle		(6)
2011	De Fendert		
2018–2019	RBC		
Total		596	(166)

Managerial career
- 2012: VV Kogelvangers
- 2012–2013: Jong FC Dordrecht (assistant)
- 2018–2019: RBC (player-manager)
- * Club domestic league appearances and goals

Hendricus "Henk" Johannes Petrus Vos (born 5 June 1968) is a Dutch former professional footballer who played as a forward.

== Career ==
Vos was born in Wouw, Netherlands. He started his professional career in the 1984–85 season for RBC Roosendaal. Later on, he played in Belgium and France, returning to Holland to play for Feyenoord in 1996. For the 2007–08 season he played at RBC Roosendaal on an amateur basis.

He ended his career in 2009, yet restarted as an amateur player for KFC Meerle in Belgium in early 2010 before playing half a year with the Dutch side De Fendert.

== Coaching career ==
During his time at RBC from 2006 to 2009, Vos worked as a youth coach for the club. In February 2012, Vos was appointed manager of VV Kogelvangers. He was at the club until the end of the season, before joining the technical staff of FC Dordrecht as a forward coach and assistant manager for the Jong Dordrecht team. He left the position at the end of 2013. He later became a youth coach at NAC Breda but was released in June 2016 after an incident where Vos was involved in a fight with a security guard, who broke his nose. Vos was later arrested during the investigation.

Ahead of the 2018–19 season, Vos returned to RBC as a player-manager and responsible for the club's youth sector. The club announced on 20 April 2019, that he had been fired.

Vos has also been a coach at the Feyenoord soccer schools for several years.

== Career statistics ==
Appearances and goals by club, season and competition
Club	Season	League		
Club	Season	Division	Apps	Goals
RBC	1984–85	Eerste Divisie	12	2
PSV	1985–86	Eredivisie	0	0
Willem II	1985–86	Eerste Divisie	5	1
Willem II	1986–87	Eerste Divisie	9	0
Willem II	Total		14	1
RBC	1986–87	Eerste Divisie	12	6
FC Eindhoven	1987–88	Eerste Divisie	4	0
Germinal Ekeren	1988–89	Eerste Klasse	25	8
Germinal Ekeren	1989–90	Eerste Klasse	15	9
Germinal Ekeren	Total		40	17
Standard Liège	1989–90	Eerste Klasse	14	3
Standard Liège	1990–91	Eerste Klasse	10	1
Standard Liège	1991–92	Eerste Klasse	26	13
Standard Liège	1992–93	Eerste Klasse	28	6
Standard Liège	Total		78	23
Metz (loan)	1990–91	Ligue 1	16	2
Sochaux	1993–94	Ligue 1	33	12
Sochaux	1994–95	Ligue 1	33	9
Sochaux	1995–96	Ligue 2	18	5
Sochaux	Total		84	26
Feyenoord	1995–96	Eredivisie	11	3
Feyenoord	1996–97	Eredivisie	29	6
Feyenoord	1997–98	Eredivisie	30	3
Feyenoord	1998–99	Eredivisie	11	3
Feyenoord	1999–2000	Eredivisie	0	0
Feyenoord	Total		81	15
FC Den Bosch	1999–2000	Eredivisie	30	10
RBC	2000–01	Eredivisie	23	11
RBC	2001–02	Eerste Divisie	26	15
RBC	2002–03	Eredivisie	29	7
RBC	Total		78	33
NAC Breda	2003–04	Eredivisie	26	6
TOP Oss	2004–05	Eerste Divisie	18	3
KFC Nieuwmoer	2004–05	Vierde klasse	0	0
Germinal Beerschot	2004–05	Jupiler League	8	2
Racing Mechelen	2005–06	Derde klasse	14	3
RBC	2005–06	Eredivisie	13	1
RBC	2006–07	Eerste Divisie	31	6
RBC	2007–08	Eerste Divisie	21	4
RBC	2008–09	Eerste Divisie	16	0
RBC	Total		81	11
KFC Meerle	2009–10	Provinciale Antwerpen 3A	?	6
Career total			596	166

== Honours ==
=== Club ===
Standard Liège

- Belgian Cup: 1992–93

Feyenoord

- Eredivisie: 1998–99

Beerschot A.C.

- Belgian Cup: 2004–05
