= Fontys University of Applied Sciences =

University in The Netherlands

- Fontys Hogescholen
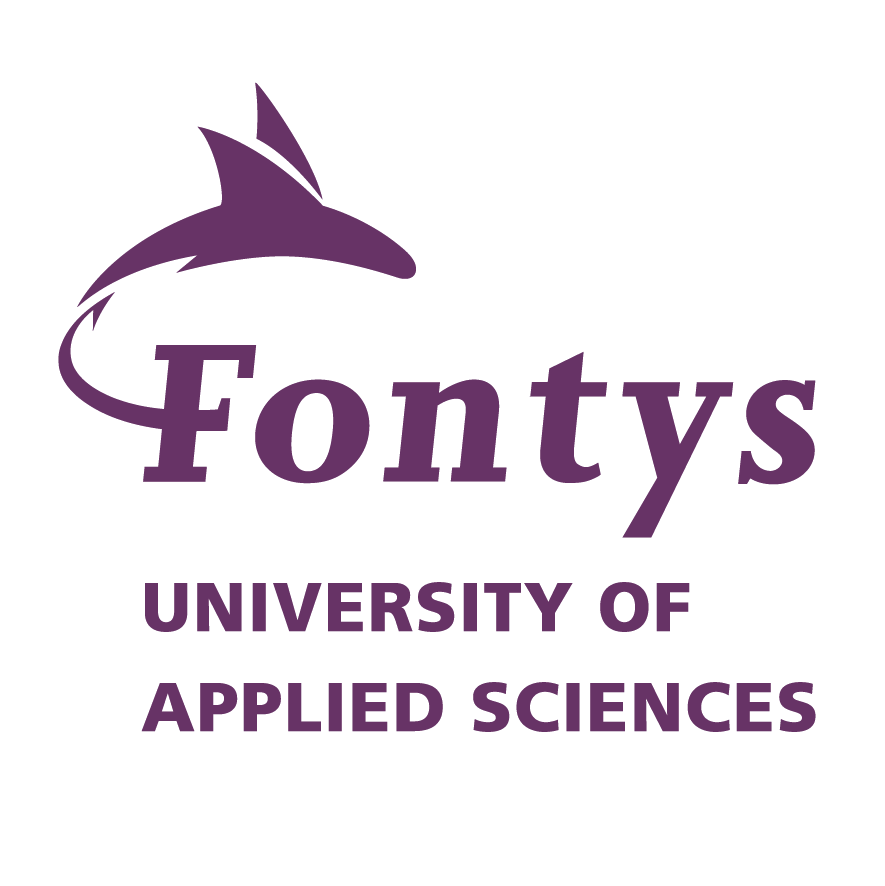
- Motto: For Society
- Type: Public University of Applied Sciences
- Established: 1996
- Administrative staff: 4,343
- Students: 44,486
- Location: Eindhoven, Tilburg and Venlo, Netherlands
- Website: www.fontys.edu

Fontys University of Applied Sciences is a Dutch university of applied sciences, located in the southern Netherlands. It has over 44,000 students on several campuses. The three largest Fontys campuses are located in the cities of Eindhoven, Tilburg and Venlo. The name Fontys comes from the Latin word "fons" which means "source". Fontys offers 200 bachelor's and master's study programmes in the fields of economics, technology, health care, social work, sports and teacher training. A selection of these programmes are offered in German and English. Independent Dutch university rankings by Keuzegids place Fontys among the top-ranked large universities of applied sciences in the Netherlands. In 2014, former Fontys Chairperson Nienke Meijer was named the "Most Influential Woman in the Netherlands".

== Ranking ==
On a regular basis, Fontys University of Applied Sciences is among the top-ranked universities of applied sciences in the Netherlands. Fontys scores above-average in the study fields of engineering, IT, logistics as well as business administration and management (consisting of the study programmes International Business (IB), Marketing Management (MM), and International Finance & Control (IFC).

The ranking is done annually by the Centre of Higher Education Information and published in the Keuzegids HBO. It takes into account the perspectives of experts, students and universities themselves. Next to factors such as student satisfaction with their university's lecturers and study content, student success rates, IT facilities and practice-orientation the ranking is based on the accreditation reports of the Dutch-Flemish Accreditation Organisation (NVAO).

All Fontys study programmes are accredited by the Dutch-Flemish Accreditation Organisation (NVAO) or equivalent British accreditation bodies.

About 11% of Fontys students come from abroad; they represent more than 70 countries around the world, with a large delegation from Germany. Many of these international students are enrolled as exchange students or degree students in English-taught bachelor and master programmes, often offered in cooperation with Fontys' partner universities in other countries.

== Campuses ==
Fontys campuses are equipped with computer rooms, libraries and student restaurants. Wireless internet is available throughout the campuses, enabling students to bring their laptop. In this way students can work, study, search for information whenever they want. The Student Facilities department at Fontys University of Applied Sciences offers advice and support about financial affairs, course-related matters, practical matters, sports facilities and student associations, supervises during the course of studies and provides information about events relating to the study process.

=== Eindhoven ===
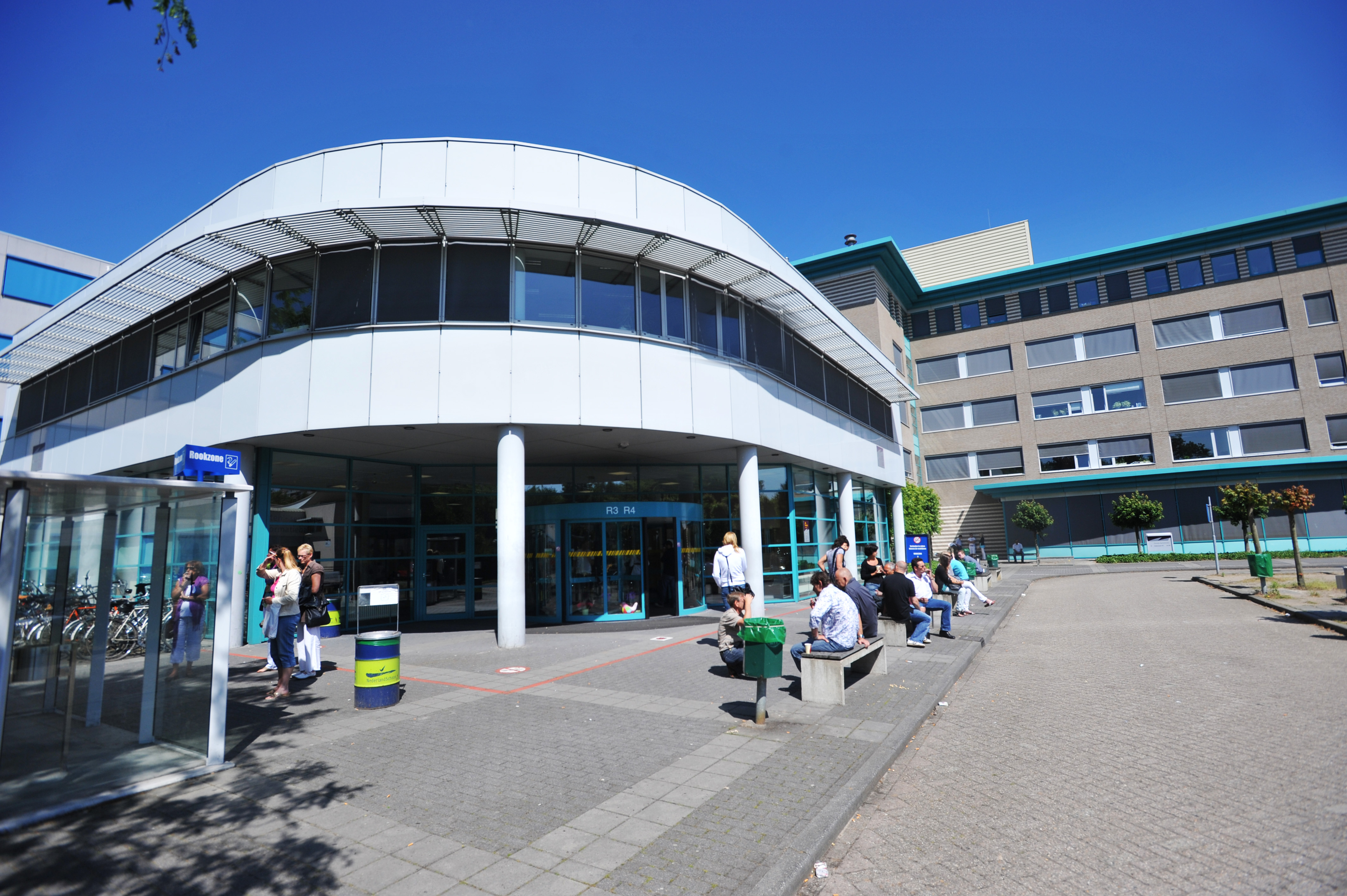
Fontys International Campus Eindhoven

Fontys International Campus Eindhoven is located in the south-east of the Netherlands.

=== Tilburg ===
Fontys has three locations in Tilburg.

Fontys International Campus Stappegoor is located on the southern outskirts of the city. The campus population consists of diverse students, ranging from Economics students to Software engineering students.

Fontys School of Fine and Performing Arts (Dutch: Fontys Hogeschool voor de Kunsten – FHK) groups all educational programs in the visual and performing arts under the same roof in a building known as the Kunstkluster ('Art cluster') located in the centre of the city.

The Fontys Academy of Journalism (Dutch: Fontys Hogeschool voor Journalistiek – FHJ) is located in the Professor Gimbrèrelaan, in the west of the city, and is one of the four journalism schools in the Netherlands. It is one of the four journalism schools in the Netherlands. Founded in 1980 as the Academy of Journalism and Public Relations, the school had a Catholic background in its early years, although students and teachers have always doubted the existence of Catholic journalism. Several years ago the school joined Fontys Hogescholen, a community of higher vocational schools in the south of the Netherlands, and was given its current name. The FHJ-building is located in the west of Tilburg, at the Gimbrerelaan. The FHJ houses studios for radio and television, as well as a printing press for internal publications. Students can choose various majors, including audiovisual journalism, newspaper and magazine journalism and corporate journalism. In 2005, the academy celebrated its 25th anniversary, organizing several conferences on the future of journalism in the Netherlands.

=== Venlo ===
Fontys International Campus Venlo

Fontys Venlo is a young campus with an old history. At first, the Venlo University of Applied Sciences was established on the grounds of the former country estate De Wylderbeek (whose forest still contains protected artifacts from Roman times). In the late 1990s, the institution joined the Fontys network. Several renovations and expansions helped the campus buildings ("which were originally built by a congregation of nuns in 1965") remain "state of the art on the inside and outside". Today, the campus houses three institutes: Fontys Teacher Training Academy (FKE), Fontys Technology and Logistics (FTenL) and Fontys International Business Studies (FIBS).

Although Venlo's city centre was rebuilt after the Second World War, it has buildings dating back to the 14th century. The city retained the historical significance of its monuments and old facades. Ald Weishoes (Old Orphanage), Romerhoes (Roman House), the Stadhuis (City Hall) and the St. Martinuskerk (St. Martin's Church) are just some of the many historic buildings in Venlo's city centre. From 2013 to 2015, together with The Hague, Venlo was chosen to have the "best city centre in The Netherlands".

Both the location on the River Meuse and its close distance to Germany make Venlo one of Europe's most important logistics hotspots. It is accessible via six surrounding airports: Eindhoven Airport, Maastricht Aachen Airport, Düsseldorf Airport, Weeze Airport, Cologne Bonn Airport and Dortmund Airport.

== Study programmes ==
Fontys provides full-time study programmes. Several programmes are offered in English or German.

=== English and German Bachelor's programmes ===
==== ICT and Engineering ====
- Applied Physics (Dutch or English)
- Applied Science (Dutch or English)
- Applied Mathematics/Data Science (English)
- Automotive Engineering (English)
- Electrical and Electronic Engineering (English)
- Industrial Engineering & Management (English)
- Mechatronics Engineering (English or German)
- Mechanical Engineering (English or Dutch-German language mix)
- Information Technology (specializations: Software Engineering, Business Informatics) (English)
- Information & Communication Technology (specializations: ICT & Business, ICT & Media, ICT & Software Engineering, ICT & Technology, ICT & Media Design, ICT & Infrastructure) (English or Dutch)
- Industrial Design Engineering (English or Dutch-German language mix)

==== Logistics ====
- Logistics (specializations: Logistics Management, Logistics Engineering) (English or German)
- International Fresh Business Management (English or German)

==== Physiotherapy ====
- Physiotherapy (English)

==== Arts ====
- Circus and Performance Art (English)
- Dance Academy (English)

=== English Master's programmes ===
- Master of Science in Business and Management (MBM) (in cooperation with University of Plymouth, UK)
- Master of Science in finance (MFIN) (in cooperation with University of Plymouth, UK)
- Master of Business Administration (MBA) (in cooperation with FOM University of Applied Sciences, Germany)
- Master of Science in International Logistics/ Procurement/ Operations and Supply Chain Management (in cooperation with University of Plymouth, UK)
- Master of Architecture
- Master of Urbanism
- Master of Music
- Master in Performing Public Space

=== Exchange programmes ===
Fontys has over 100 partner universities around the world, including Australia, Canada, China, Finland, Hong Kong, Italy, Mexico, Taiwan, the United Kingdom, the United States, Vietnam, and Zambia among others. In their third academic year, Fontys students are given the opportunity of studying abroad for one semester at one of the mentioned partner universities. Alternatively, students can choose to stay at Fontys and take part in one of many academic minors (secondary academic discipline) such as International Business Management, Trendwatching, Game Business or Event Management.

== Accommodation ==
Fontys student dormitory "Delos", Venlo

Fontys offers accommodation to its international students.

== Student company and software factory ==
Together with about 10 students from different study programmes, all business students at Fontys in Venlo start their own company which is officially registered in the Dutch Commercial Registry. For nearly a year the students manage their company including: writing a business plan, selling shares to finance their entrepreneurial activities, developing and selling a product/service, and filing a tax report. All positions and functions within the company are filled by students. At the end of the academic year the company is properly liquidated. Over the past years, several Fontys student companies participated in national and international business competitions and were awarded for their successful business. Engineering students at Fontys Venlo take part in the Software Factory where they develop customized software solutions for cooperating companies.

== Internships and work placements ==
During their studies, all Fontys students do two internships (one semester in the third and fourth academic year). Internships can be done in the Netherlands or abroad. Students chose the company themselves but Fontys also provides a list of local and international partner companies. During both internships students work on a specific company project. They are supervised by one university lecturer and one company employee. Amongst others, these internships are useful for building a professional network and getting work experience which eases getting a job after studies.

== Partner companies ==
Fontys has partnerships with more than 500 international companies including 3M, Adidas, Bayer, BMW, Coca-Cola, Daimler AG, Deloitte, Ernst & Young, Henkel, IKEA, KPMG, L'Oréal, Metro AG, Nike, Inc., Philips, Porsche, Robert Bosch GmbH, Siemens, Sony, Vodafone and Volkswagen. These companies either offer projects and/or internships to Fontys students.

== Student organizations ==
Fontys has several student associations throughout its campuses:

- DaVinci – First student association in Venlo founded in 1999
- FC FSV-Venlo – Official Fontys Venlo football club playing at Seacon stadium of VVV-Venlo
- Fontys4Fairtrade – Fontys Venlo sustainability committee working on projects to raise awareness for the environment and sustainability
- Knowledge Business Consulting (KBC) – student-run business consultancy headquartered in Fontys Venlo providing consultancy services to companies in both Germany and the Netherlands
- Omnia – Fontys Venlo student association organizing various events on campus (for business-related study programmes)
- Proxy – Student association of ICT English stream in Fontys Eindhoven (study programme: Information and Communication Technology)
- Student Sports Venlo – Organizing sports for students such as football, basketball, volleyball, tennis, rowing, fitness and urban dance

== Notable alumni ==
- Elly Blanksma-van den Heuvel – Former mayor of Helmond, Dutch politician and former banking manager at Rabobank
- Pieter Elbers – chief executive officer (CEO) and chairman of the national flag carrier of the Netherlands KLM (Royal Dutch Airlines)
- Florence Kasumba – Ugandan-German actress
- Onno Hoes – Dutch politician and former Mayor of Maastricht
- Twan Huys – Dutch journalist, television presenter, and author
- Johannes Oerding – German singer-songwriter
- Heiko Andreas von der Gracht, German economist, futurist, and non-fiction author
- Hans Teeuwen – Dutch comedian, musician, actor and filmmaker
- Floor Jansen – Dutch singer, lead singer of Finnish symphonic metal band Nightwish
- Johan Roijakkers – Dutch national basketball team coach
- Jan Ridders – Dutch machinist
