= Jan Ridders =

Jan Ridders (Roosendaal, August 14, 1941 - January 28, 2026) was a Dutch machinist, engineer and machine designer.

Ridders' designs, freely distributed, along with assistance to engineers building these motors, has brought him world reputation. He has designed and created motors which had previously been conceived only theoretically, such as a low temperature difference Stirling engine which works on heat at the tip of the hand. These motors, besides spurring engineer's imagination have also been followed up by some companies selling products based on these Ridder's design.

He was the maker of small Stirling Engines, "flame eater", steam engines and other types of small practical heat engines. Ridders gave free plans for building his motors and offered advice with his experience in various places on the web.

After years of stagnation, once shown working models and the simplicity of the design, companies began to invest in developing concentrated light thermal solar energy solutions.

== Biography ==
Ridders studied physics at the Technical College of Eindhoven and continued to work for 40 years at Philips company in Roosendaal.

Upon retiring in October 2001 he began designing and building machinery, with skills which he taught himself at Philips, by closely observing their practice, while working with the mechanical department. In 2004 he received the Dutch Glacius award for his continued contribution to the Dutch National Association of Model Builders He regularly wrote in articles in "De Modelbouwer" Magazine, as well as the UK based Model Engineer magazine and the US "ModelBuilder" magazine.

Until 2007 he had been building steam engine models, but then turned to more elaborate and unusual Heat Engines, especially vacuum engines such as the flame thrower, Stirling and Rankyne engines (closed cycle Butane based steam engines). He has also been building models of unusual 2 stroke and 4 stroke motors.
