= Heerle =

- Village
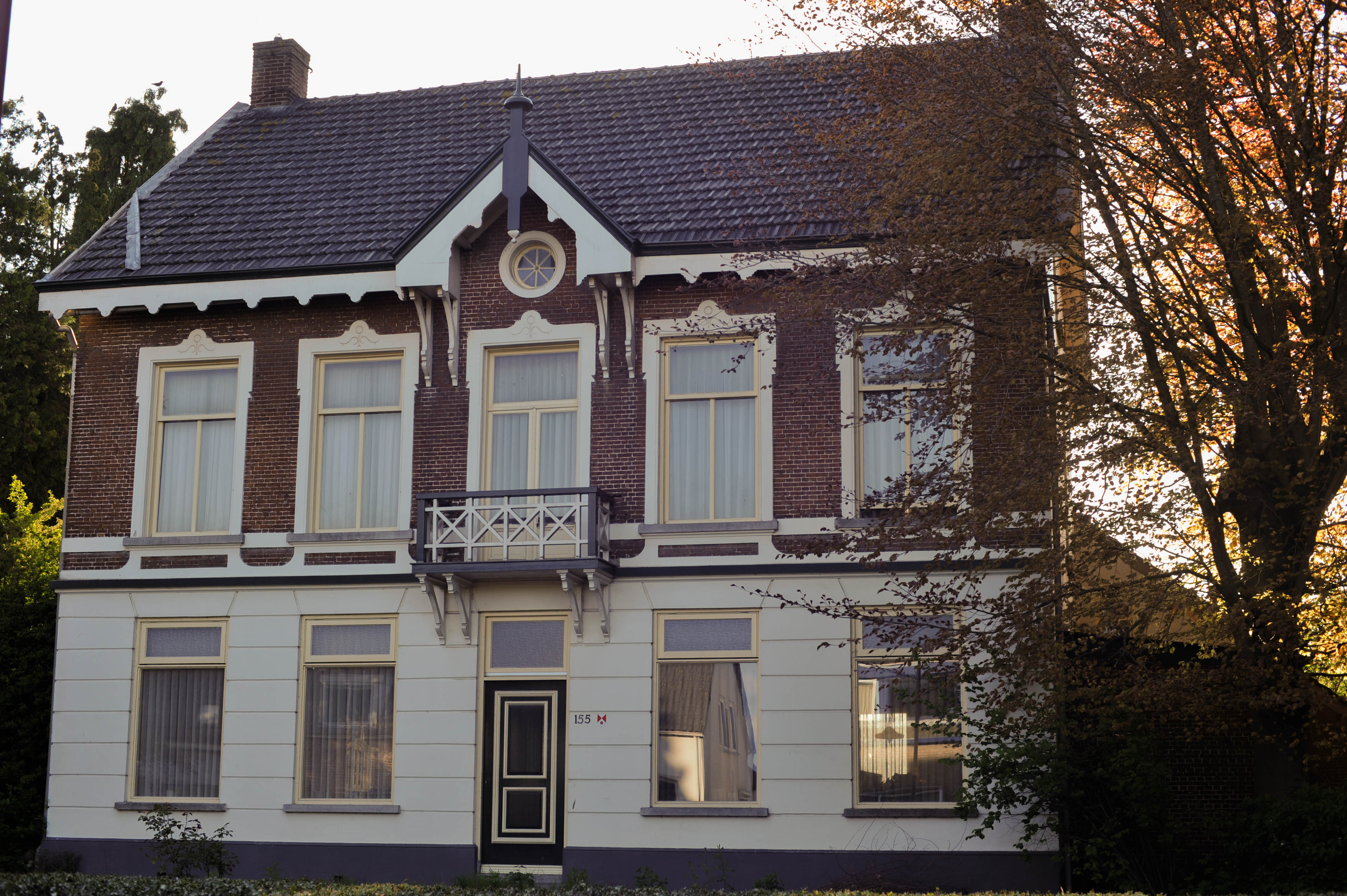
- Former mayor's residence

- Location in the province of North Brabant in the Netherlands Heerle (Netherlands)
- Coordinates: 51°31′6″N 4°21′33″E
- Country: Netherlands
- Province: North Brabant
- Municipality: Roosendaal

Area
  - Total: 8.49 km^{2} (3.28 sq mi)
- Elevation: 7 m (23 ft)

Population (2021)
  - Total: 1,830
  - Density: 216/km^{2} (558/sq mi)
- Time zone: UTC+1 (CET)
  - Summer (DST): UTC+2 (CEST)
- Postal code: 4726
- Dialing code: 0165
- Website: heerle.info

Heerle (Brabantic: Èrel) is a village in the municipality of Roosendaal, in the Dutch province of North Brabant. Before the municipal reorganisation of 1997, Heerle was part of the municipality of Wouw. It lies between the cities of Bergen op Zoom and Roosendaal.

== Etymology ==
The name Heerle has been documented for the first time in the 13th century as Harella and is possibly a conjunction of the word har (meaning heightened sandy soil) and loo, a small forest. The customary local Brabantic pronunciation differs significantly from the standard Dutch one, so that linguistic misconceptions regularly occur.

== History ==
Heerle was mentioned for the first time in a charter of the Sint-Bernardusabdij in Hemiksem, which could raise tenth penning taxes in the village for the first time in 1277. In 1307, Heerle was proclaimed an independent parish, previously it was part of the parish of Bergen op Zoom.

Regardless of having an independent church community, Heerle hadn't developed its own village governance and remained dependent on the aldermen of neighbouring Wouw. Furthermore, Heerle didn't have a village centre until the beginning of the 19th century.

== Sights ==
- The Sint-Gertruduskerk is a church built in 1862 and 1924, situated at Herelsestraat 100.
- The Boerin met Kalf (Peasant Woman with Calf) statue in front of the Sint-Gertrudiskerk, it is customary for the villagers to dress her up during Carnaval.

== Gallery ==
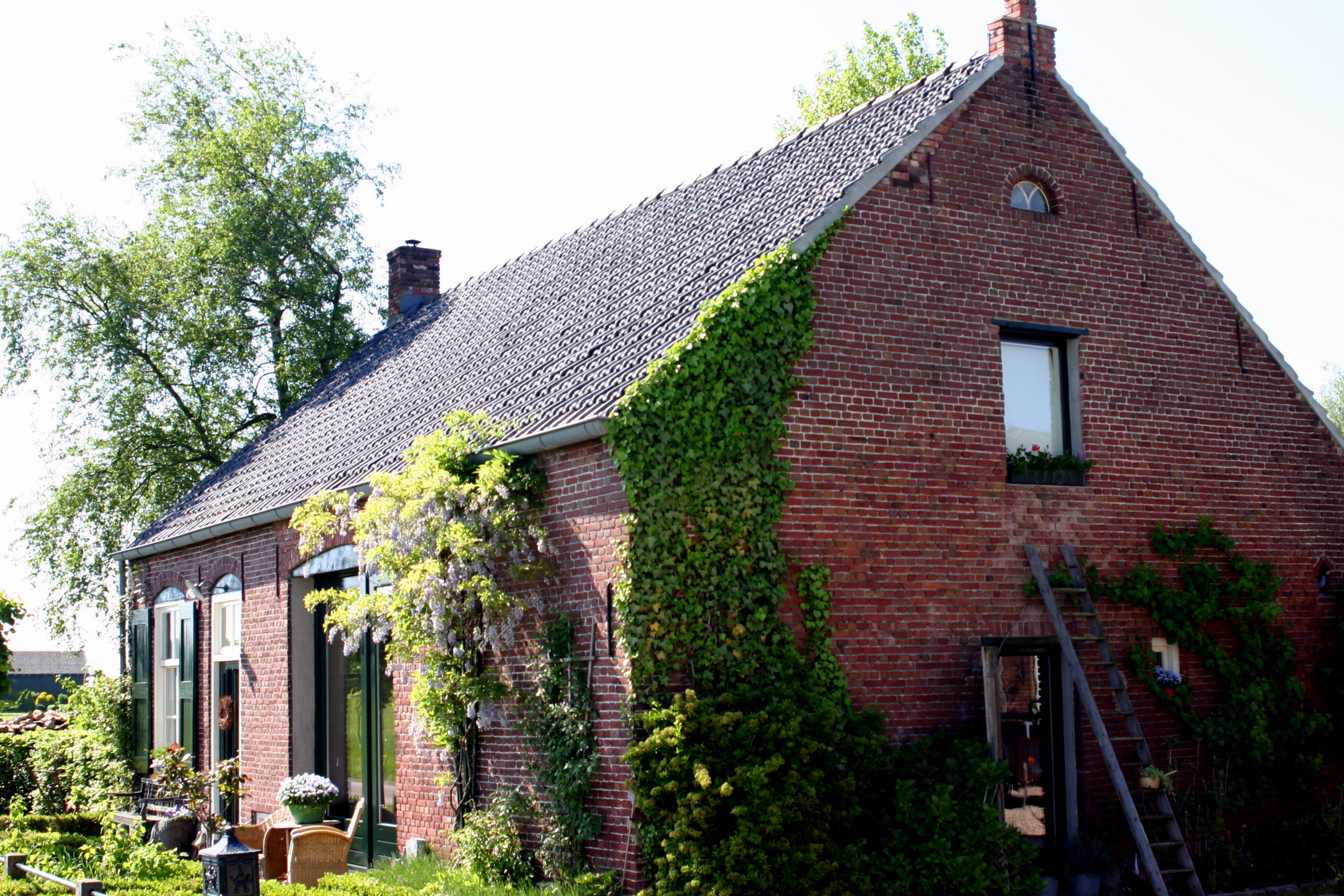
House in Heerle

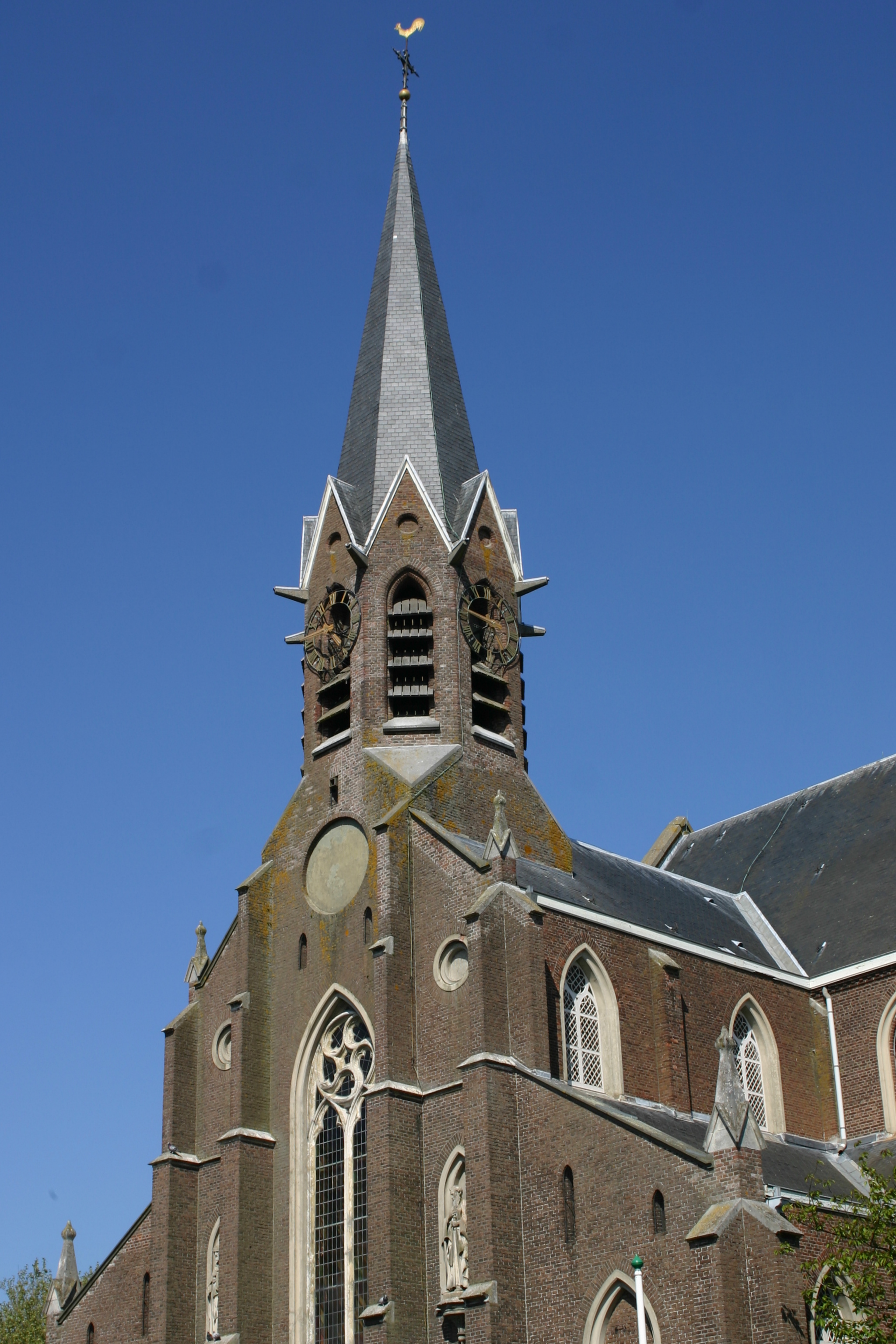
St Gertrudis Church
