= Léon Orthel =

Dutch composer, pianist and teacher

- Born: Léon Orthel; 4 October 1905; Roosendaal, Netherlands
- Died: 6 September 1985 (aged 79) The Hague, Netherlands
- Education: Royal Conservatory of The Hague; Berlin Hochschule für Musik
- Genres: Classical
- Occupations: Composer, pianist, teacher
- Instrument: Piano
- Years active: 1920s–1980s

Léon Orthel (4 October 1905, Roosendaal – 6 September 1985, The Hague) was a Dutch composer, pianist and teacher.

In 1921 he became a student of the Royal Conservatory of The Hague. He studied violin with André Spoor, piano with Everhard van Beijnum and composition with Johan Wagenaar. He later studied at the Berlin Hochschule für Musik with Paul Juon and Curt Sachs.

His compositions include among other works 6 symphonies and two cello concertos.

His third and fifth symphonies received awards from the Dutch government, in 1946 and 1962 respectively.

== Works ==
Orchestral

- Symphony No. 1, Op. 13 (1931–1933)
- Symphony No. 2 Piccola Sinfonia, Op. 18 (1940)
- Symphony No. 3, Op. 24 (1943)
- Kleine balletsuite (Little Ballet Suite), Op. 31 (1947)
- Scherzo No. 1, Op. 37 (1954–1955)
- Scherzo No. 2, Op. 38 (1956–1957)
- Symphony No. 5 Musica iniziale, Op. 43 (1959–1960)
- Symphony No. 6, Op. 45 (1960–1961)
- Tre movimenti ostinati, Op. 59 (1971–1972)
- Album di disegni, Op. 81 (1976–1977)
- Evocazione, Op. 83 (1977)
- Tweede suite (Suite No. 2), Op. 88 (1980)

Concertante

- Kleine burleske for cello and orchestra, Op. 8 No. 2 (1926)
- Scherzo for piano and orchestra, Op. 10 (1929)
- Concerto No. 1 for cello and orchestra, Op. 11 (1929, Berlin) "Aan mijn Ouders"
- Concertino alle burla for piano and orchestra, Op. 12 (1930) Voor Pim
- Symphony No. 4 Sinfonia concertante for piano and orchestra, Op. 32 (1949)
- Concerto for trumpet and orchestra, Op. 68 (1973–1974)
- Muziek for double bass and orchestra, Op. 89 (1980–1981)
- Concerto No. 2 for cello and orchestra, Op. 95 (1984)

Chamber music

- Sonata No. 2 for violin and piano, Op. 15 (1933)
- Capriccio for violin and piano, Op. 19 (1939)
- Sonata No. 2 for cello and piano, Op. 41 (1958)
- Cinque pezzettini for clarinet and piano, Op. 46 (1963)
- String Quartet, Op. 50 (1964)
- Sonata for viola and piano, Op. 52 (1964–1965)
- Otto abbozzi for flute, cello and piano, Op. 57 (1971)
- Mouches au rosier, 2 Miniatures for violin and piano, Op. 76 (1975)
- Kleine suite (Little Suite) for violin and piano, Op. 79 (1977)
- Miniaturen for flute (recorder) and piano, Op. 80 (1977)

Harp

- Vijf bagatellen (5 Bagatelles) for harp, Op. 67 (1973)
- Petite suite for harp, Op. 69 (1974)
- Cinque schizzetti for harp, Op. 82 (1977)

Organ

- Sonata, Op. 66 (1973)
- Secunda sonata, Op. 91 (1981)

Piano

- Preludes, Op. 7 (1925)
- Tien pianostukjes voor kinderen (10 Piano Pieces for Children), Op. 14 (1933)
- Epigrammen, Op. 17 (1938)
- Twaalf kinderstukjes (12 Pieces for Children), Op. 20 (1933)
- Sonatina No. 2 Miniatuur sonatine, Op. 23 (1942)
- Twee preludes (2 Preludes), Op. 27 (1944–1945)
- Sonatina No. 3, Op. 28 (1945)
- Drie kleine stukken (3 Little Pieces), Op. 34 (1952)
- Kerstliedje met vrije variaties, Op. 35 (1952)
- Sonatina No. 4, Op. 36 (1953)
- 5 Etudes-caprices, Op. 39 (1957)
- Deux hommages en forme d'étude, Op. 40 (1958)
- Tre pezzettini, Op. 42 (1958)
- Sonatina No. 5 voor de linkerhand (For the Left Hand), Op. 44 (1959)
- Vijf kleine stukjes (5 Little Pieces) for piano 4-hands, Op. 47 (1963)
- Drie Exempelkens, Op. 48 (1963–1965)
- Die drie boexkens van een magistercken, 3 Little Preludes, Op. 60 (1972)
- Sonatina No. 6, Op. 70 (1974)
- Sonatina No. 7 Uit 1920 en 1922, Op. 73 (1975)
- Sonatina No. 8 Sonatina capricciosa, Op. 78 (1975)
- Sonatina No. 9, Op. 84 (1978)
- Sonatina No. 10, Op. 90 (1981)
- Zes miniaturen (6 Miniatures) for piano (2- and 4-hand), Op. 92 (1981)
- Drie stukken (3 Pieces), Op. 93 (1981–1982)

Vocal

- Twee liederen (2 Songs) for voice and piano, Op. 16 (1934); words by Rainer Maria Rilke
- Nonnen-Klage for soprano and piano or orchestra, Op. 25 (1943); words by Rainer Maria Rilke
- Drie liederen (3 Songs) for soprano or tenor and piano, Op. 26 (1943); words by Rainer Maria Rilke
- Twee liederen (2 Songs) for soprano and piano, Op. 30 (1946–1947); words by Rainer Maria Rilke
- Twee liederen (2 Songs) for soprano and piano, Op. 33 (1950–1951); words by Rainer Maria Rilke
- Drie liederen (3 Songs) for soprano and piano, Op. 49 (1954–1965); words by E. L. Smelik
- Drie liederen (3 Songs) for soprano and piano, Op. 51 (1965); words by Rainer Maria Rilke
- Twee liederen (2 Songs) for soprano and piano, Op. 53 (1965); words by Rainer Maria Rilke
- Twee liederen (2 Songs) for baritone and piano, Op. 54 (1967); words by Rainer Maria Rilke
- Drie liederen (3 Songs) for soprano and piano, Op. 55 (1970); words by Rainer Maria Rilke
- Twee liederen (2 Songs) for bass-baritone and piano, Op. 56 (1971); words by Rainer Maria Rilke
- Trois chansonnettes for high voice and piano, Op. 58 (1971); words by Arthur Rimbaud
- Sept mélodies (7 Songs) for soprano and piano, Op. 61 (1972); words by Rainer Maria Rilke
- Quatre esquisses valaisannes for soprano and piano, Op. 62 (1972); words by Rainer Maria Rilke
- Six quatrains valaisans for soprano and piano, Op. 63 (1972); words by Rainer Maria Rilke
- Vier liederen, Op. 64 (1972); words by Martinus Nijhoff
- Neuf mélodies (9 Songs) for soprano and piano, Op. 65 (1973); words by Rainer Maria Rilke
- Une martyre for high voice and orchestra, Op. 71 (1974–1975); words by Charles Baudelaire
- Deux mélodies (2 Songs) for high voice and piano, Op. 72 (1975); words by Charles Baudelaire
- Drie liederen (3 Songs) for soprano and piano, Op. 74 (1975); words by Rainer Maria Rilke
- Vier liedjes (4 Songs) voor bariton en piano, Op. 75 (1975); words by J. C. Bloem
- Klein drieluik: twee kwatrijnen en een kort gedicht van A. Roland Holst for baritone and piano, Op. 77 (1975); words by Adriaan Roland Holst
- Vier liederen (4 Songs) for alto and piano, Op. 85 (1978)
- Vier liederen (4 Songs) for soprano and piano, Op. 86 (1980)
- Herfst (Autumn), 3 Short Songs for soprano and piano, Op. 87 (1980)
- Vijf Slauerhoff liederen (5 Slauerhoff Songs) for bariton and piano, Op. 94 (1982); words by J. Slauerhoff
