= Ingrid van Lubek =

Dutch triathlete

Personal information
- Born: 12 May 1971 (age 55) Roosendaal en Nispen

Sport
- Country: Netherlands

Ingrid Jeanine van Lubek (born 12 May 1971 in Roosendaal en Nispen) is an athlete from the Netherlands. She competes in triathlon.

Van Lubek competed at the first Olympic triathlon at the 2000 Summer Olympics. She took thirty-third place with a total time of 2:09:29.00.

== Achievements ==
2006
1st Offroad triathlon, Lanklaar (Belgium), 16 September
