= Joseph Michel (politician) =

Belgian politician (1925–2016)

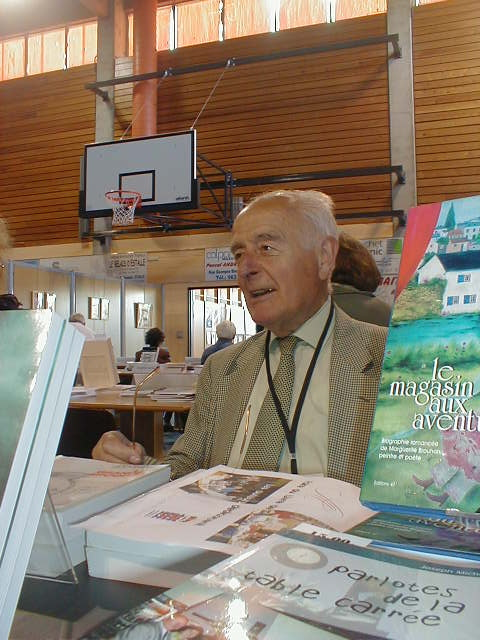
Joseph Michel in 2007

Joseph Michel (25 October 1925 – 3 June 2016) was a Christian-Democrat Belgian politician, member of the PSC, who was President of the Belgian Chamber of Representatives (1980–81) and who twice served as Minister of the Interior.

Joseph Michel was born in Saint-Mard, Virton in 1925. In 1958, he was elected a member of the city council of Virton (1959–94), where he also served as alderman (1959–70) and mayor (1970–82). He became a member of the Belgian Chamber of Representatives in 1961 and served until 1991. He was the President of the Chamber of Representatives from 1980–81. Michel was minister of the Interior (1974–77) in the first government of Leo Tindemans. During his term, he put through a massive fusion operation in which the number of Belgian communes was lowered from 2.359 to 596. From 1977 to 1979, he was minister of French-language National Education. He later again served a second term as minister of the Interior (1986–88) under Wilfried Martens. On 3 June 2016, Michel died in Arlon aged 90.
