= Weitzenhoffer Family College of Fine Arts =

Art school at the University of Oklahoma

Coordinates: 35°12′36″N 97°26′51″W

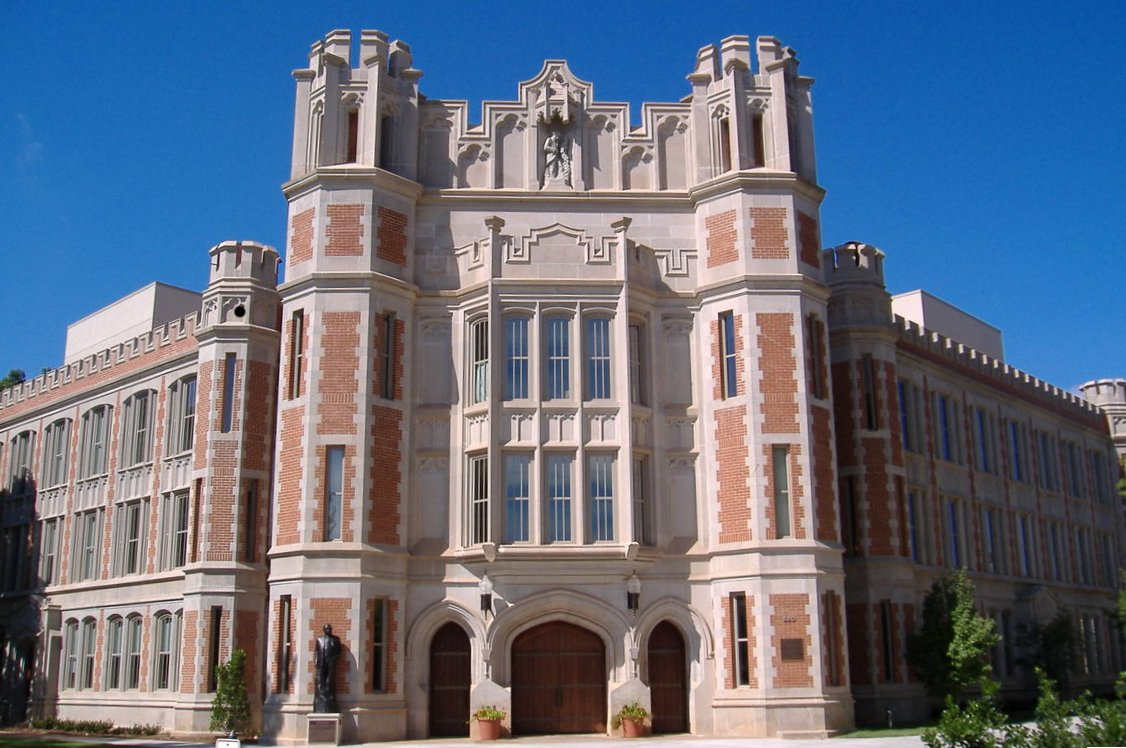
- The Donald W. Reynolds Center, one of the buildings occupied by the College of Fine Arts. Formerly known as Holmberg Hall until 2005.
- Type: Public
- Established: 1924
- Parent institution: University of Oklahoma
- Affiliations: NASM
- Dean: Mary Margaret Holt
- Undergraduates: 799 (Fall 2005)
- Postgraduates: 228 (Fall 2005)
- Location: Norman, Oklahoma, United States
- Website: www.ou.edu/finearts/

The Weitzenhoffer Family College of Fine Arts is the fine arts unit of the University of Oklahoma in Norman. The college produces nearly 300 concerts, recitals, dramas, musicals, operas and dance performances each year. The college occupies several buildings on campus including the Museum of Art, Rupel J. Jones Fine Arts Center, Donald W. Reynolds Center for the Performing Arts, and Catlett Music Center.

Started in 1924 (the fourth-oldest of OU's colleges), the College was renamed in 2004 for the Weitzenhoffer family (longtime supporters of the College and University).

== Academic programs ==
- School of Visual Arts
  - Art History
  - Studio Art
- School of Dance
  - Ballet Performance
  - Ballet Pedagogy
  - Modern Dance Performance
- Helmerich School of Drama
  - Acting
  - Dramaturgy
  - Stage Management
  - Design
    - Scenery
    - Costume
    - Lighting
    - Sound
- School of Music
  - Music Education
  - Music Technology
  - Musicology
  - Theory
  - Brass
  - Composition
  - Conducting
  - Keyboard, including the Pipe Organ
  - Percussion
  - Strings
  - Voice
  - Woodwinds
- Weitzenhoffer School of Musical Theatre
