= Wouw =

- Village
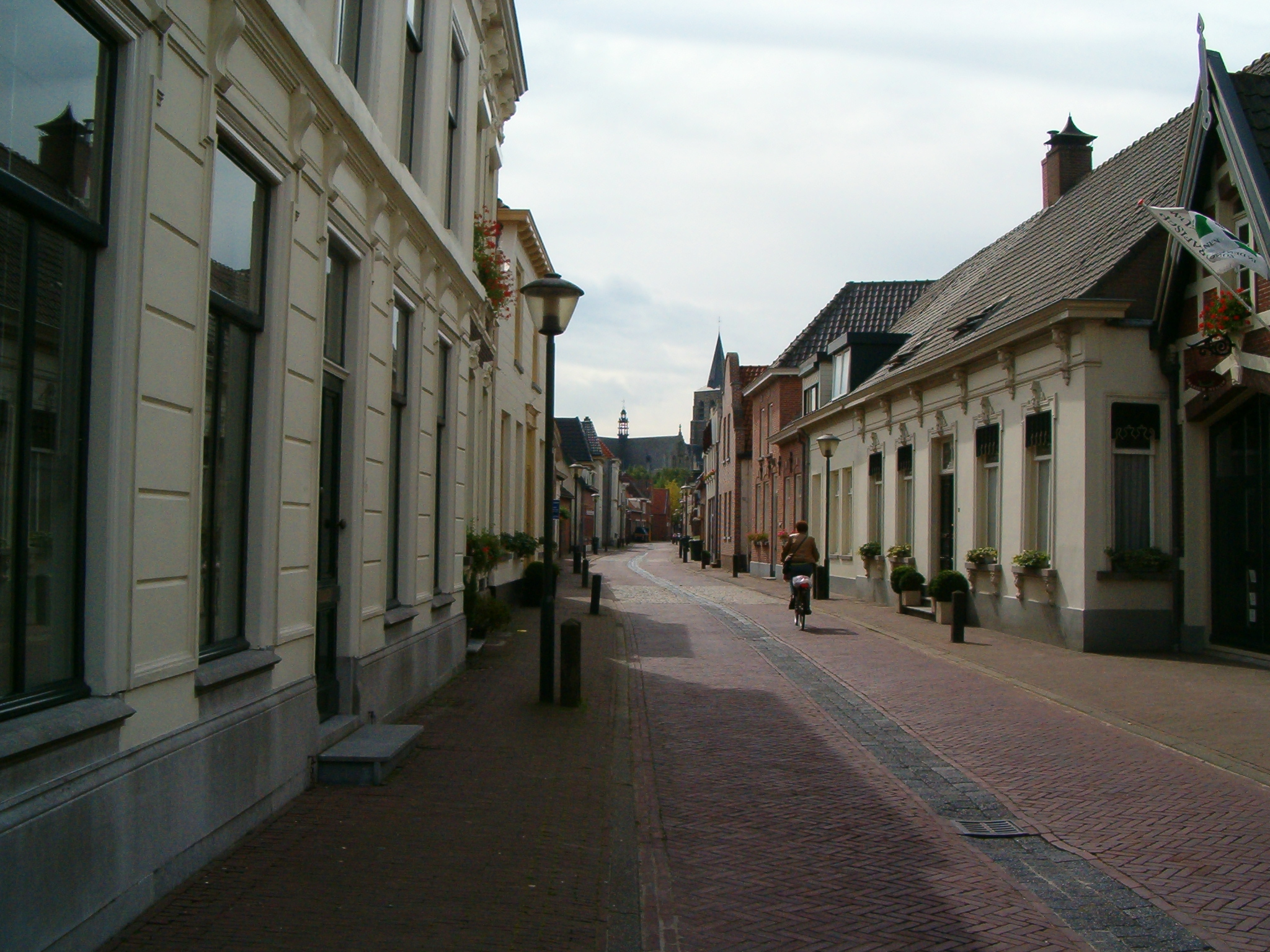
- Roosendaalsestraat in Wouw

- Flag Coat of arms

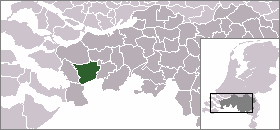

- Location in the province of North Brabant in the Netherlands Wouw (Netherlands)
- Coordinates: 51°31′20″N 4°23′20″E
- Country: Netherlands
- Province: North Brabant
- Municipality: Roosendaal

Area
  - Total: 8.82 km^{2} (3.41 sq mi)
- Elevation: 6 m (20 ft)

Population (2025)
  - Total: 4,850
  - Density: 550/km^{2} (1,420/sq mi)
- Demonym: Wouwenaar
- Time zone: UTC+1 (CET)
  - Summer (DST): UTC+2 (CEST)
- Postal code: 4724
- Dialing code: 0165

Wouw is a village in the southern Netherlands. It is located in North Brabant, between the cities Roosendaal and Bergen op Zoom, close to the border with Belgium.

Until 1997 Wouw was the seat of the municipality of Wouw. The municipality consisted of the villages of Wouw, Heerle, Wouwse Plantage and Moerstraten. In 1997 Wouw was merged into the municipality of Roosendaal en Nispen, the resulting enlarged municipality becoming known simply as Roosendaal.

== History ==
The origins of Wouw probably go back to around 1200 which is when exploitation of the local woodland began to occur. The evolution from woodland clearing to village progressed relatively rapidly during the high Middle Ages, with mention of a church in 1277, and the establishment of the parish in 1304. The first surviving record of the moated castle, built by the Lords of Bergen op Zoom, dates from 1342.

In 2007, Wouw celebrated its 775th year of existence.

== The castle of Wouw ==
Between Wouw and Heerle there used to be a castle. This castle is first mentioned in 1379 as "Het Huis te Woude", which means: The House in Woude. (Woude=Wouw). It was a round castle surrounded by a body of water. This provided protection to its lord and its inhabitants.

The grounds outside the castle were very fertile, and many farms were to be found there. The lord could see and thus supervise all the farmers' grounds from his castle. The lord also had a military role. For example, he fought in several battles.

After the invention of gunpowder the inhabitants of the castle would no longer be safe. The castle therefore became one of the first castles to be strengthened by fortifications. During the Eighty Years' War the castle was captured several times. As a consequence the inhabitants eventually fled. The castle was inhabited from 1583 till 1594. Since then the castle has had many uses but eventually it slowly vanished.

Nowadays nothing much can be seen of the castle. Plants have been planted marking parts of the foundations of the castle, so the positions of some of the buildings can still be inferred.

== Demographics ==
As demonstrated in the table below, the biggest age group of Wouw are middle-aged adults (aged 45–65).

Age distribution of Wouw
Age group	Population	Percentage
0-15	685	14.1%
15-25	510	10.5%
25-45	975	20.1%
45-65	1355	27.9%
65+	1330	27.4%

94,5% of residents are born in the Netherlands, 5,5% are foreign-born residents. 37,7% of foreign-born residents are born outside of Europe and 62,3% are born inside of Europe.

== Facilities ==
There is 1 child center called De Baayert. That's the only school in Wouw.

Wouw has 2 pharmacies and 2 GPs. The closest hospital is the Bravis Ziekenhuis in Roosendaal.

Wouw has 1 supermarket, a Jumbo. There is also a community center at the Geerhoek.

== Transportation ==
Bus 161 goes through Wouw. Bus 161 goes like this:

Roosendaal Kortendijk - Roosendaal railway station - Wouw - Heerle - Bergen op Zoom railway station - Bergen op Zoom Bergse Plaat

== Gallery ==
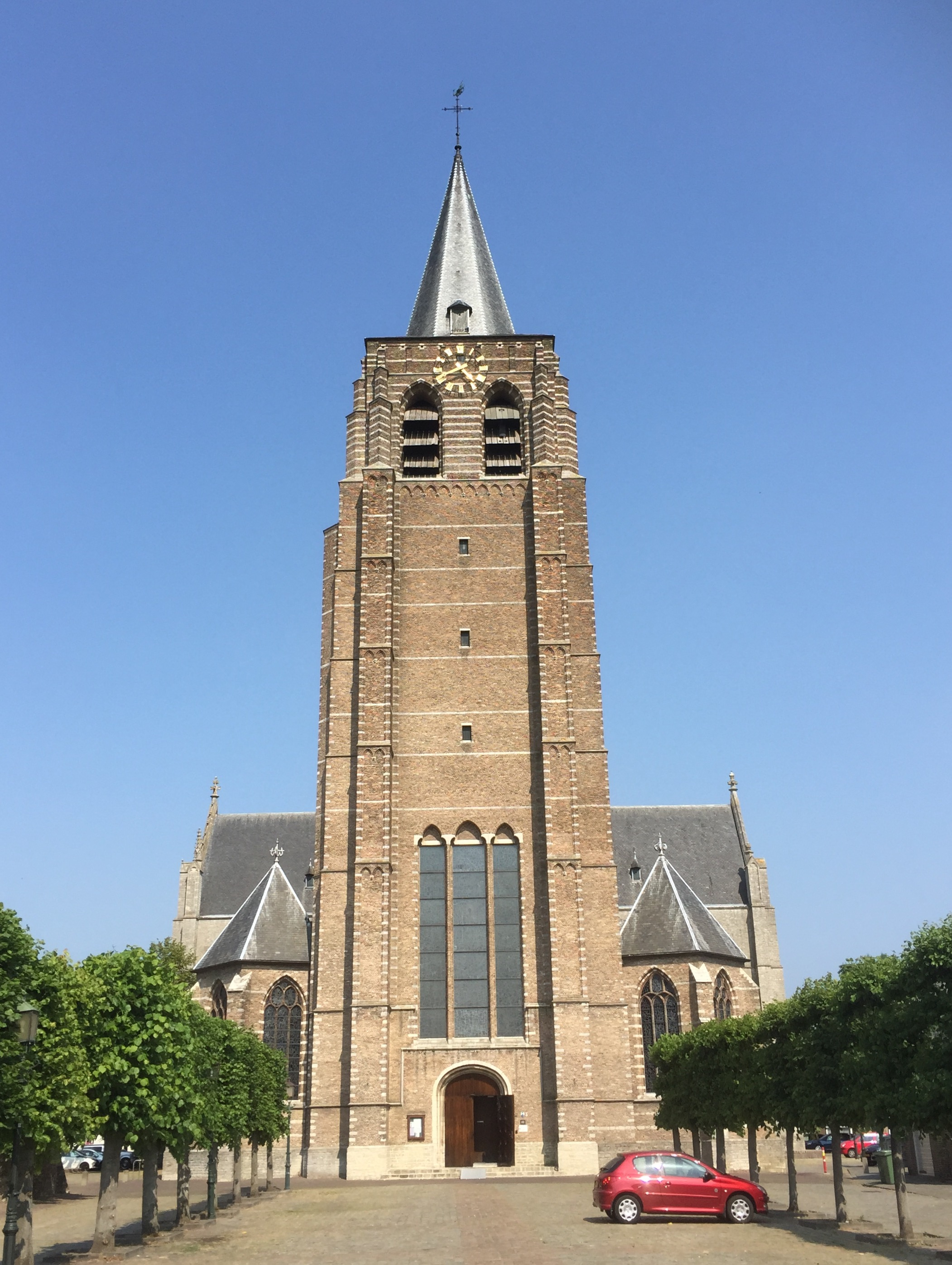
St Lambert Church

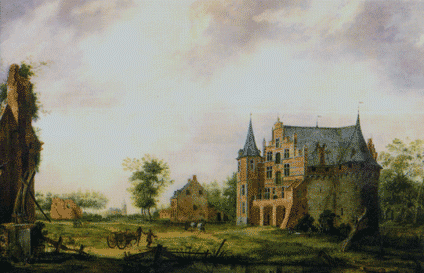
Painting of the Wouw Castle (1775)

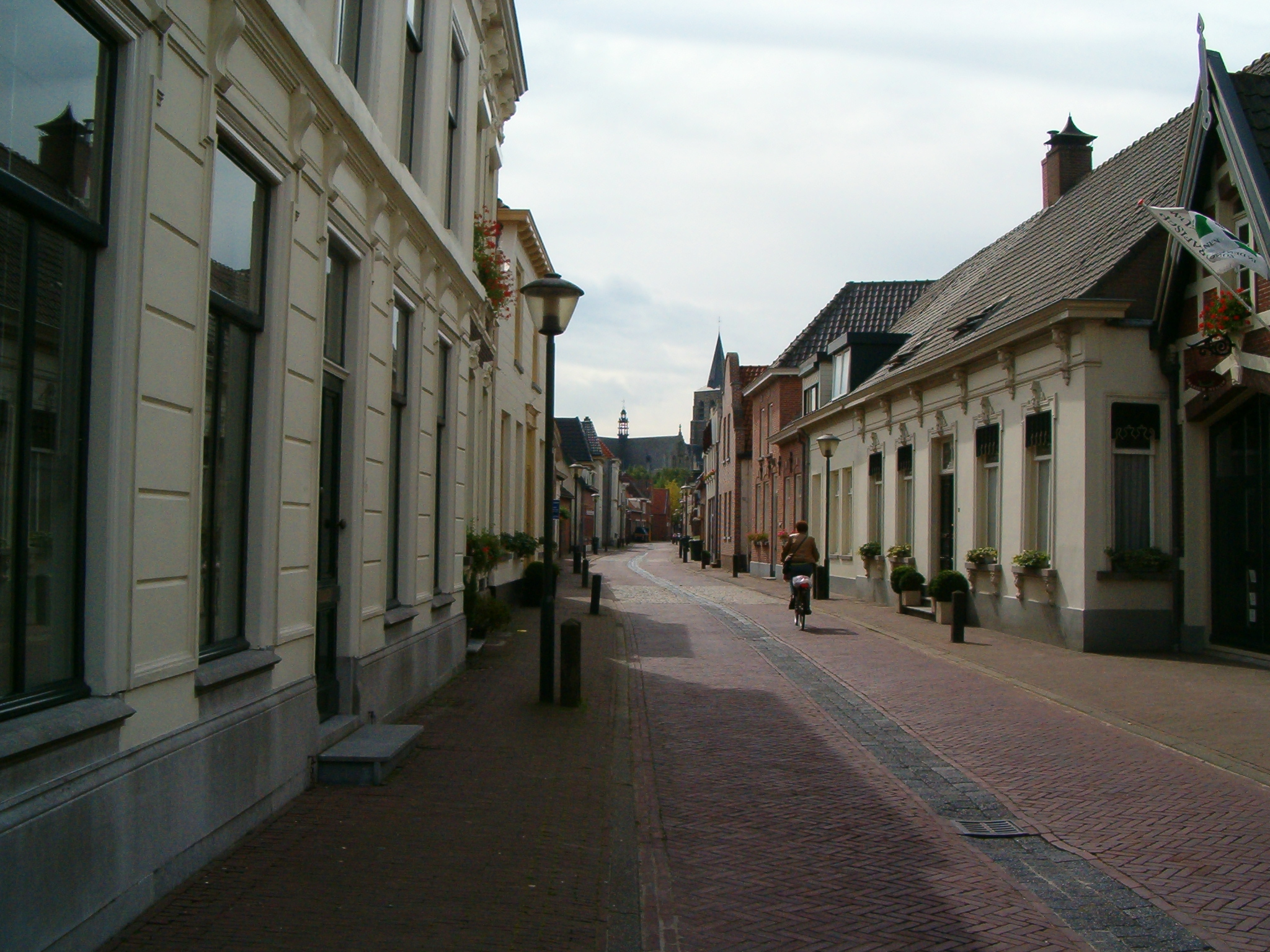
Street view

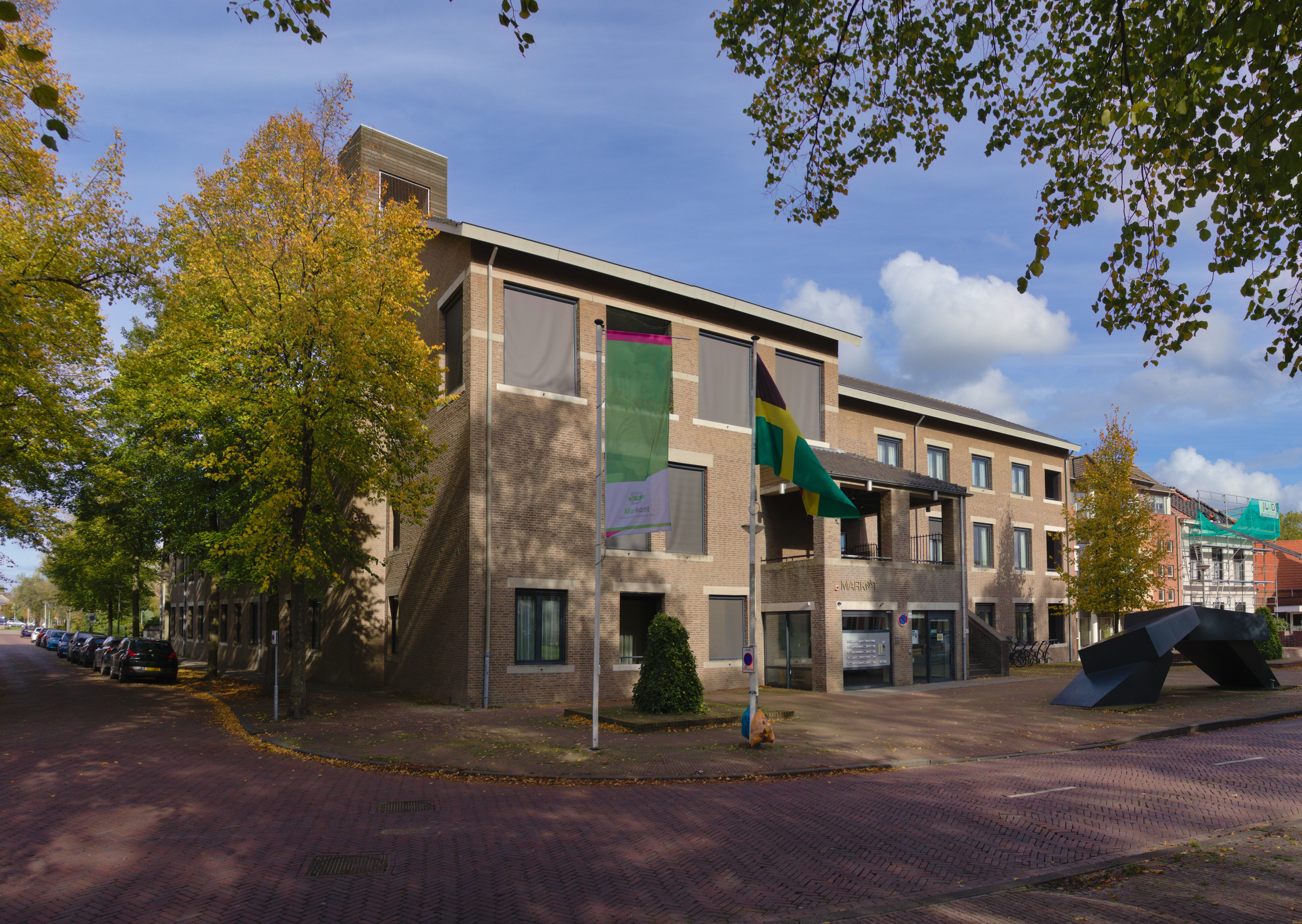
Town hall
