= A29 motorway (Netherlands) =

Freeway in the Netherlands

Location of the A29 motorway.

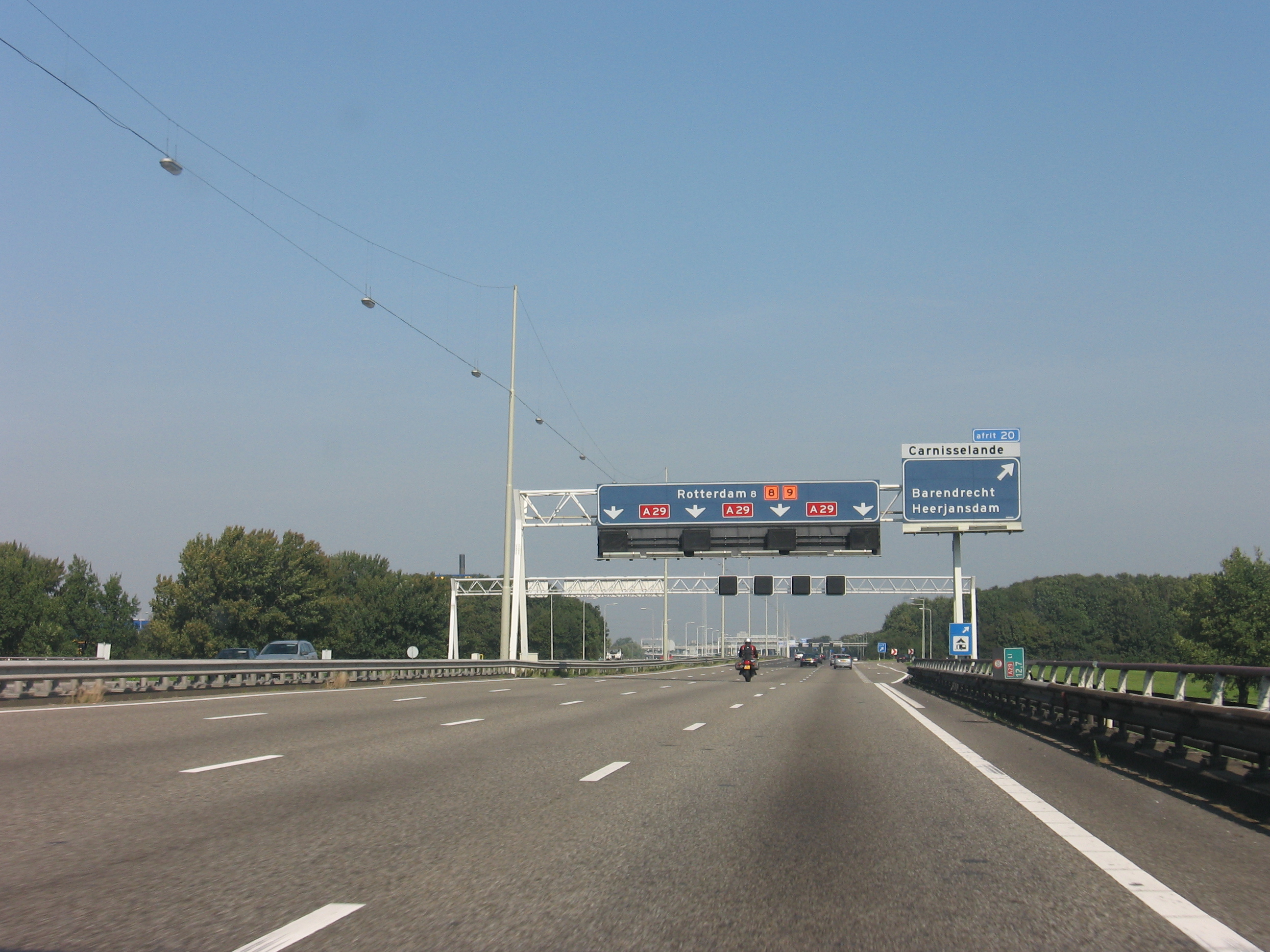
Northbound A29 near exit 20.

The A29 motorway is a motorway in the Netherlands. It is approximately 31 kilometres long. The A29 is located in the Dutch provinces South Holland and North Brabant.

There are no European routes that are part of the A29 motorway.

== Section Klaaswaal-Dinteloord ==
The section between the planned interchange Klaaswaal and the southern terminus, near Dinteloord, is officially a part of Rijksweg number 4. However, until that road's missing link between Rotterdam (at interchange Benelux) and Klaaswaal has been constructed, the section Klaaswaal-Dinteloord will be referred to as A29, to avoid confusion.

== Exit list ==
Province	Municipality	km	mi	Exit	Destinations	Notes
South Holland	Rotterdam	10	6.2	—	A 15 / S 103 – Rotterdam, Barendrecht, Ridderkerk	
South Holland	Barendrecht	12	7.5	20	Kilweg	
South Holland	Hoeksche Waard	16	9.9	21	N 217 – Oud-Beijerland, Puttershoek, Maasdam	
South Holland	Hoeksche Waard	23– 90	14– 56	—	A 4 north – Oud-Beijerland, Poortugaal	Unbuilt interchange for connection of A4 from the north
South Holland	Hoeksche Waard	93	58	22	N 487 east / Provincialeweg – Numansdorp, Zuid-Beijerland	
South Holland	Goeree-Overflakkee	99	62	—	A 59 south / N 59 west – Oude-Tonge, Ooltgensplaat	North end of A59 overlap
North Brabant	Moerdijk	102	63	23	Maltaweg to Willemstad	
North Brabant	Moerdijk	104– 210	65– 130	—	A 4 south / A 59 east – Dinteloord, Fijnaard	South end of A59 overlap
1.000 mi = 1.609 km; 1.000 km = 0.621 mi: Concurrency terminus; Unopened
