= Dinteloord en Prinsenland =

Coordinates: 51.634428°N 4.368782°E

Coat of Arms

Dinteloord en Prinsenland is a former municipality in the Dutch province of North Brabant, now part of the municipality of Steenbergen. The main town of the municipality was Dinteloord.

Dinteloord en Prinsenland was a separate municipality until 1997.
