= A4 motorway (Netherlands) =

Highway in the Netherlands

A4 motorway
- Rijksweg 4
- Motorways in the Netherlands with A4 bold

Route information
- Part of E19 / E30 / E312
- Maintained by Rijkswaterstaat
- Length: 119 km (74 mi)
- Existed: 25 June 1938 –present

Northern segment
- North end: E19 / E22 / A 10 in Amsterdam
- Major intersections: A 9 near Badhoevedorp; A 5 near Hoofddorp; A 44 near Leimuiden; E30 / A 12 near The Hague; E19 / A 13 near The Hague; E25 / A 20 in Rotterdam
- South end: A 15 in Rotterdam

Southern segment
- North end: A 29 / A 59 near Heijningen

- Major intersections: E312 / A 58 in Bergen op Zoom; E312 / A 58 near Woensdrecht
- South end: A12 near Zandvliet (Belgium)

Location
- Country: Kingdom of the Netherlands
- Constituent country: Netherlands
- Provinces: North Holland, South Holland, North Brabant

Highway system
- Roads in the Netherlands; Motorways; E-roads; Provincial; City routes
← A 2	→ A 5

The A4 motorway, also called Rijksweg 4, is a motorway in the Netherlands running southwards from Amsterdam to the Belgian border near Zandvliet, north of the city of Antwerp. The 119-kilometre-long (74 mi) A4 is divided into two sections; the first and longer section runs from Amsterdam to the A15 near the city of Rotterdam, while the second section starts near Heijningen, where the A29 and the A4 meet, going to the Belgian border.

Between the A29 near the village of Klaaswaal (south of Rotterdam), and the Sabina interchange (where the A4-A29 meets the A59), the route is numbered A29. Three European routes run concurrently with this highway at some point: E19, E30, and E312.

There are no authorized plans for the missing link between Pernis (south of Schiedam and west of Rotterdam) and the A29 near Klaaswaal, though right-of-way has been acquired for the future A29 interchange with the A4.

== Route description ==
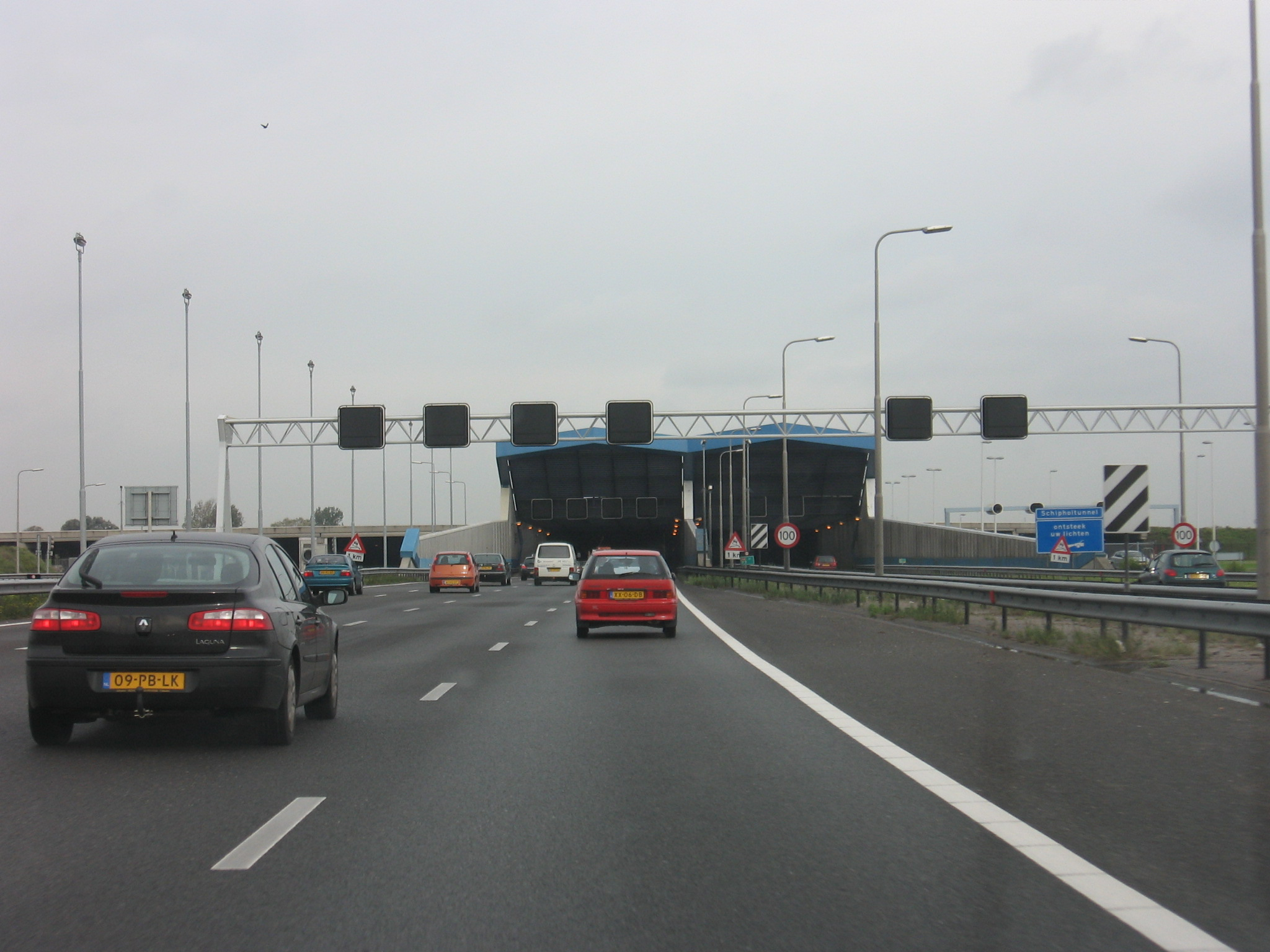
A4 entering the Schiphol tunnel from the south.

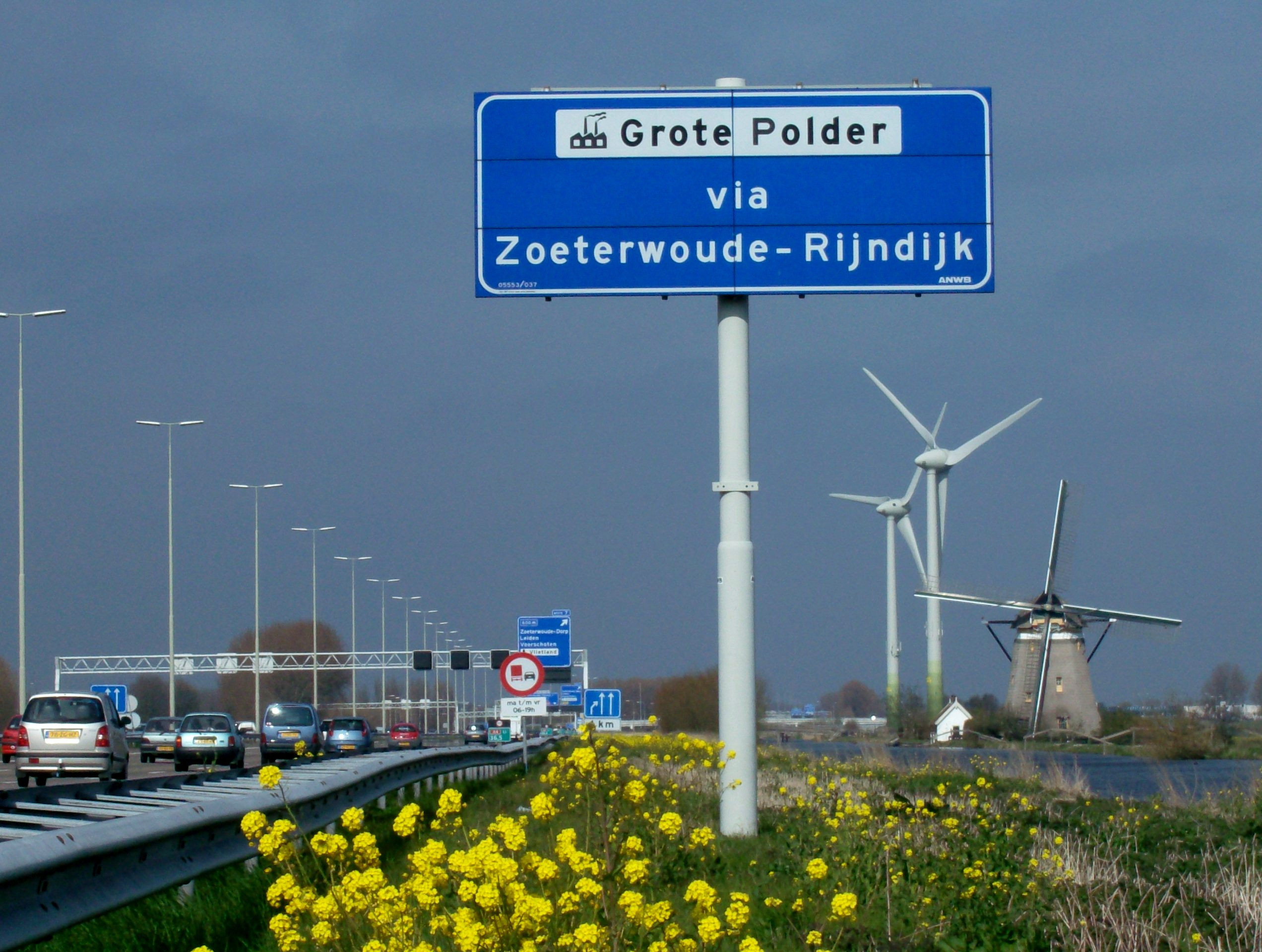
Dutch scenery along A4 with windmill "Zelden van Passe" near Zoeterwoude.

=== Amsterdam to Rotterdam ===
The A4 begins in the province of North Holland in the southeastern part of the city of Amsterdam at an interchange on the A10 ring road called Knooppunt De Nieuwe Meer. At this interchange, the E19 continues from the eastern segment of the A10 onto the A4, and the E22 begins northwards along the A10. Even though the A4 starts at this interchange, the A4 has priority from the eastern direction toward the interchange, as entering onto the A4 from the east does not require a turn (in contrast to staying on the A10, which requires a turn to the right).

From the north, staying on the A10 and entering the A4 both require a turn. From the Knooppunt De Nieuwe Meer interchange, the road travels to the southeast, concurrent with a rail line that runs between both directions of the motorway. After 4 kilometres (2.5 mi), the road intersects A9 at the Badhoevedorp partial cloverleaf interchange. After leaving this interchange, the rails travel southwards underground towards Amsterdam Airport Schiphol.

==== Schiphol ====
Continuing towards Schiphol, the A4 enters the 650-meter-long (2,130 ft) Schiphol tunnel underneath a runway and two taxiways. Exit 2 of the motorway serves the airport. After this, another taxiway bridge crosses the A4. Southeast of Schiphol, A5 joins the A4 at the De Hoek incomplete interchange. This interchange lacks a ramp from the A5 to the northbound lane of the A4, because the A9 already serves traffic from A5 to A4 in both directions. Shortly before leaving the province of North Holland and entering South Holland, the A44 branches off of the A4 at the Burgerveen interchange. This interchange is also incomplete, as one can only travel onto the A44 from Amsterdam.

==== The Hague ====
The road crosses the Ringvaart using the Ringvaart aqueduct and enters South Holland. At the border between Leiderdorp and Leiden, the road uses the Limes aqueduct to travel under the Oude Rijn river. The A4 now approaches The Hague. In the Vinex-location Leidschenveen-Ypenburg in the municipality of The Hague, the motorway connects to the Prins Clausplein stack interchange with the A12 and the E30, and the Ypenburg interchange with the E30 (A13) and the E19. In between these two interchanges, the A4, the E19, and the E30 all run concurrently, and at this location, there is a basketweave exchange. The outer lanes of the basketweave are for connecting the A13 and the stack exchange ramps to and from the A12, and the inner lanes are the continuing the A4.

==== Delft and the Nieuwe Maas ====
Leaving the basketweave interchange, the A4, now concurrent with the E30, continues southwards towards southeastern Delft, where it continues partially below ground level through the Midden-Delfland region. It then enters the Rotterdam region at the semi-directional Kethelplein T-interchange, where the A4 travels to the south and the A20 (concurrent with the E25) travels from east to west.

When traveling under train tracks, the road approaches exit 16, which allows access to Vlaardingen to the east and Schiedam to the west. This exit is special, as the northern exit and southern entrance first travel parallel with the A4 through the Beneluxtunnel under the Nieuwe Maas river. This results in more lanes for drivers to use, since the ramps connect to the A4 on the southern side of the Nieuwe Maas. They branch off shortly after and enter the Benelux interchange (named 17a so as to not confuse drivers, since the previous exit on A15 to the west is already exit 17), an incomplete T-interchange with only a southbound exit and a northbound entrance. This interchange is the southern terminus of this segment of the A4, and the road continues both west and east as the A15.

=== Heijningen to the Belgian border ===
The final segment of the A4 with the A29 starts in the province of North Brabant near Heijningen at the Hellegatsplein interchange, crossing the estuaries Hollands Diep (to the east), Haringvliet, and the Volkerak (to the west). Shortly after, the A4 enters the Sabina trumpet interchange (named after a nearby fort) with the A59. The A29 and the A59 both enter this interchange from the north, and the A29 ends here. The A4 continues to the south, while the A59 branches off to the east.

Crossing the Dintel and passing by Dinteloord, the A4 makes a large curve to the west and subsequently continues to the south, forming a tangent around Steenbergen. In the southern part of the curve, the A4 travels along Fort Henricus, a now-demolished fort with only the shape of the land intact. Here, the road also tunnels under the Steenbergse Haven using the third Steenbergen aan Zee aqueduct.

The A4 continues southbound and passes Bergen op Zoom to the east, with a few exits serving this city. Between exits 27 and 28, the A58 runs concurrent with the E312, which joins A4 to the south. All three roads travel concurrently southbound, and at the Markiezaat trumpet interchange, the A58 and the E312 both leave the A4 and travel to the west, entering the province of Zeeland. The A4, however, continues to the south until reaching the Belgian border near Zandvliet. A few meters before crossing the border, the northbound entrance and southbound exit ramps start on Dutch soil; the rest of this exit is within Belgium and is part of the Belgian A12.

== History ==
=== 20th century ===
Work started on A4 in the 1930s, and followed high construction standards for the time. By the late 1930s, various sections were in service. One of these roads went between Amsterdam and Sassenheim, and while part of the historical A4, it is not on the current route.

In 1938, ground was broken for Rijksweg 4A, which went between Burgerveen and Leidschendam. This road would later be renumbered to Rijksweg 4, and it now forms a section of A4. Groundwork began in 1939 near Leidschendam, but was cancelled in 1942 due to World War II. Construction of the Ypenburg interchange also started that same year.

In 1957, the A4 opened between the Ypenburg and Leidschendam interchanges, the latter now known as Prins Clausplein, with 2 lanes in both directions. Construction from the latter interchange further north to Hoogmade was done in 1958. In 1960 and 1961, the section between the Burgerveen and Hoogmade interchanges opened, including an aqueduct underneath the Ringvaart canal.

One lane of Rijksweg 4 between Klaaswaal and the Hellegatsplein interchange opened in 1964, and in 1965, another lane was added. This section is currently designated as the A29. In 1966, another standalone section of the A4 was opened with 3 lanes in each direction, between Amsterdam (where the Badhoevedorp interchange is now located) and Hoofddorp, leaving a gap between Hoofddorp and the Burgerveen interchange. The Badhoevedorp interchange, which is between Amsterdam and Hoofddorp, was opened a year later in 1967, which was the first cloverleaf interchange with collector/distributor lanes in the Netherlands. In 1972, this segment of the A4 was lengthened northward to connect to the De Nieuwe Meer interchange. Another unconnected section of the A4 was constructed at the Kethelplein en Pernis interchange in 1967 in western Rotterdam. This included the construction of the Beneluxtunnel under the Nieuwe Maas, which was a tolled tunnel at construction but was converted to free in 1980. In 1972, this section was extended southward to the Benelux interchange.

In 1971, the sections of Rijksweg 4 designated as A29 were extended from the Hellegatsplein interchange to Dinteloord. It was first administratively and publicly known as Rijksweg 19, but in 1976, it was renumbered to Rijksweg 4 and designated as A29. Another section of Rijksweg 4 concurrent with A58 was opened around Bergen op Zoom between 1973 and 1976. In 1985, the Leidschendam interchange was renamed and redesigned to a 4-level stack interchange Prins Clausplein. The segment between Badhoevedorp and Hoofddorp was widened to 2x4 lanes in 1988, and ten years later in 1998, the tubes in the Schipholtunnel were renewed.

In 1993, the section around Bergen op Zoom was extended southwards from the Markiezaat interchange (where concurrency with A58 stopped) to the Belgian border near Zandvliet, where it connected to the Belgian A12. In 1999, the section between The Hague-Zuid and Delft-Zuid opened for traffic after the section between the Ypenburg interchange and The Hague-Zuid was opened with 3 lanes in each direction in 1998.

=== 21st century ===
In 1998, the A4 between Zoeterwoude and Leidschendam was widened to 2x3 lanes, and in 1999, the part between Leidschendam and the Prins Clausplein interchange was widened to 2x5 lanes. In 2003, a new set of express lanes was added to both directions between Hoofddorp and the Burgerveen interchange, giving this segment a total of 2x5 lanes. Formerly restricted to rush hours, these express lanes were permanently opened on 2 April 2013. In 2006, the segment between Hoogmade and Roelafarendsveen was widened to 2x3 lanes.

In 1997, construction had started on the second Beneluxtunnel in Rotterdam. On 11 May 2002, the project was completed with 4x2 lanes and a reversible lane, allowing for 5 available lanes in the peak direction. Between the De Nieuwe Meer and Badhoevedorp interchanges in southwestern Amsterdam, express lanes were added in 2011 to relieve the 2x3 lanes on this segment of the A4 during rush hours, which saw use by 180,000 vehicles every day. Construction for the express lanes was started in the summer of 2010. The same year, construction also started on new lanes between Hoofddorp and Hoofddorp-Zuid for the construction of the realigned N201, commissioned by the province of North Holland. These parallel lanes are between the Den Ruygen Hoek rest area and Schiphol exit. Work was completed on 15 December 2013.

Entering the Burgerveen interchange from the north, the A4 has 2x5 lanes, which is reduced to 2x2 after leaving the interchange. Even though a lot of traffic is headed to the A44 at this interchange, this was still an important bottleneck, with some 100,000 vehicles every day in the Ringvaart aqueduct that also lacked emergency lanes. Further south, the bridge over the Oude Rijn river was another bottleneck with only 2x2 lanes. After this segment, 2x3 lanes were once again available. The A4 towards Amsterdam was widened to three lanes between Hoogmade and Roelfarendsveen in 2005, with a lane added to the other direction the following year. The low bridge over the Oude Rijn was replaced by the Limes aqueduct, making the A4 deeper than 1,400 metres (4,600 ft). A second Ringvaart aqueduct was also constructed near Roelfarendsveen, which was formally opened on 31 July 2010, after which the existing aqueduct from 1961 was renovated. On 24 November 2010, the 2x3 lanes were formally opened by minister Melanie Schultz, significantly reducing traffic congestion as a result. The opening of the Limes aqueduct was in two phases. The first aqueduct was opened in 2012 next to the existing A4, almost immediately with 2x3 narrowed lanes, after which the old A4 was destroyed and the construction of the second aqueduct was started. On 25 October 2014, the second aqueduct opened. The aqueduct has space for 2x5 lanes, plus emergency lanes. The aqueduct was completely widened on 1 December 2014, when the aqueduct toward The Hague gained three normal-width lanes.

==== Delft-Kethelplein missing link ====
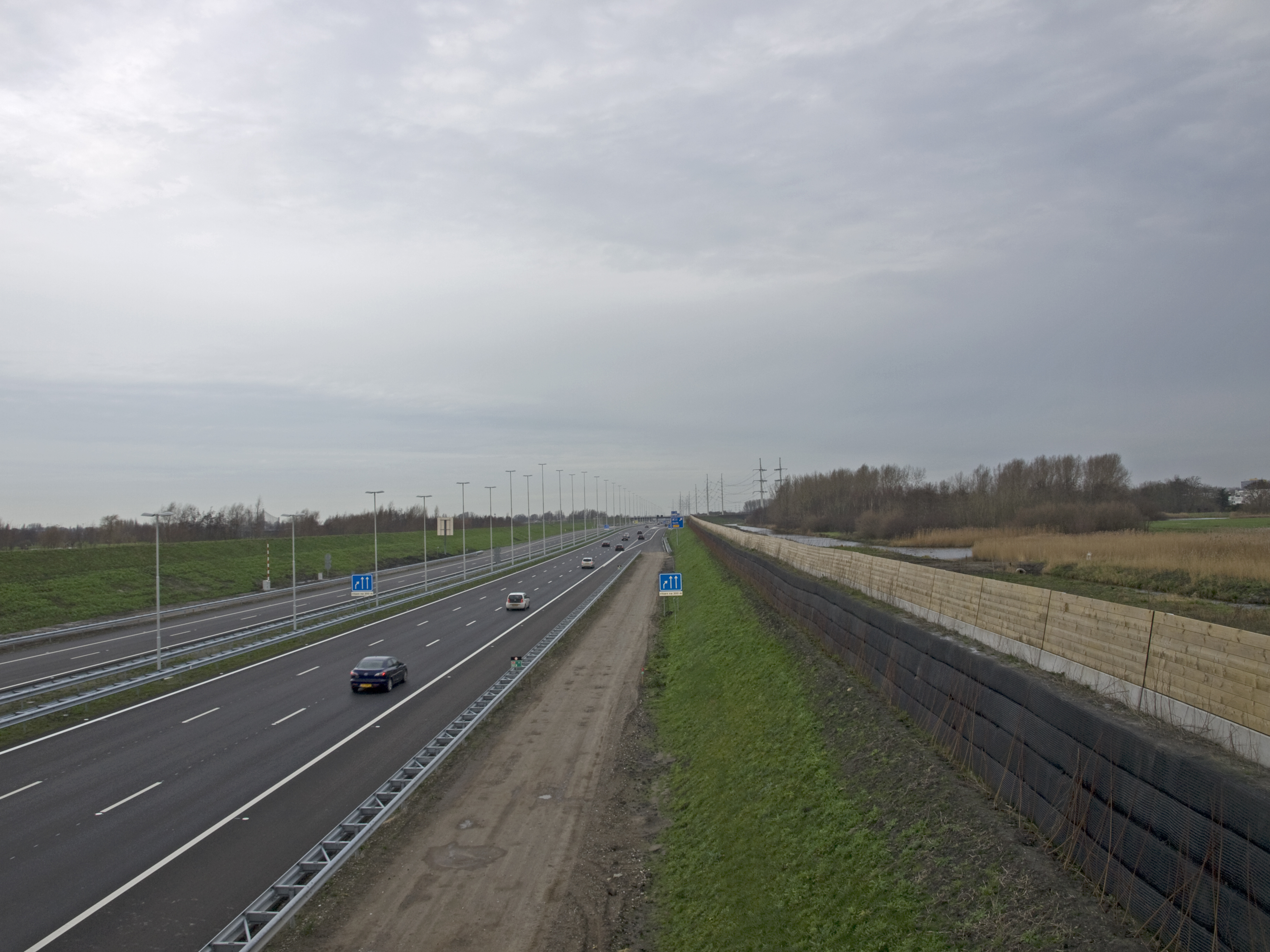
A4 south of Delft on 20 December 2015. Right (northbound) lanes are already opened for traffic; left (southbound) lanes are still closed and are expected to be opened later in the day.

Until 2015, the A4 southwest of Delft had its southern terminus of the section start in Amsterdam, with another section starting at the Kethelplein interchange in Schiedam and running southwards. The missing segment caused huge congestion on the adjacent parallel A13, which was the only motorway connecting The Hague and Rotterdam. There have been plans for creating this missing link in the past, but the government diverted finances to other projects twice. In 2006, it was estimated that this 7-kilometre-long (4.3 mi) missing section would cost €700 million to build, and in 2009, the Dutch government decided that this section would be constructed. On 2 September 2010, minister Camiel Eurlings made a record of the decision for this road segment, and on 6 July 2011, all appeals against the decision were dismissed. In autumn 2011, construction began. The missing link was completed in late 2015 and was opened on 18 December 2015 (northbound) and 20 December 2015 (southbound).

==== Dinteloord-Halsteren missing link ====
The section between Dinteloord and Halsteren until 2015 is the latest missing link of the A4 to have been constructed. It connects the south end of the A29 with another segment of the A4 that was already constructed near Bergen op Zoom. The construction of this missing link relieved the A16 and A17 from their constant traffic jams near Dordrecht, the Moerdijk bridge, and Bergen op Zoom, since they were the main and only considerably fast motorways for traveling from major Dutch cities like The Hague and Rotterdam toward the cities of Antwerp and Brussels in Belgium.

Finances for the 16-kilometre-long (9.9 mi) missing link were first acquired in 2005, consisting of a budget of €218 million. In 2006, contracts for construction near Halsteren were awarded to construction companies, and in 2007, the government decided that the A4 would be constructed west of Steenbergen, which would require creating an aqueduct under the Steenbergsche Haven canal. While a road east of Steenbergen would be much shorter and less expensive, it would have traversed through the Mark river area, which was opposed by many since it is seen as an important natural aspect in the region.

The first segment of the missing link, the so-called Halsteren bypass, was opened on 21 December 2007 by Minister of Transport Camiel Eurlings. This bypass consists of a 4-kilometer-long (2.5 mi) northwards extension from the existing southern section of A4 from exit 27 to provincial road N286 north of Halsteren, to relieve provincial road N259 through that same town. By the end of 2010, construction had begun, and it was planned that the road would have been finished by the end of 2013. On 14 March 2012, the new segment of highway around Steenbergen was officially approved by the Dutch Council of State.

On 18 June 2012, another small extension was added to the southern segment of the A4, a 1.5-kilometer-long (0.93 mi) highway linking Halsteren and Klutsdorp. By the end of December 2013, the final segment around Steenbergen between Klutsdorp and A29 near Dinteloord was completed, which created a continuously running link between Rotterdam and the Belgian border over A29 and A4.

== Future ==
Due to the rearrangement of the A9 near Badhoevedorp, the Badhoevedorp interchange with the A4 will also be altered. The new arrangement is intended to make the A9 travel around Badhoevedorp in the shape of an arc, necessitating the rearrangement of the interchange. Construction has been started in December 2013 and is planned to be done in 2017. Because of the construction of the Rijnlandroute, which will be designated as the N434, the parallel structure near Zoeterwoude will have to be lengthened even further southward up to the Hofvliet interchange with the Rijnlandroute.

On 9 May 2014, the draft of a plan to widen part of the A4 was made available for inspection, followed by the real planning procedure on 17 December 2014. Construction on this will according to the plan be started in 2015. The A4 will be widened to 2x4 lanes between the new interchange Hofvliet and exit Leidschendam. To allow this, only a southern lane needs to be built because there is already a northbound emergency lane present. Costs are estimated at €11.3 million.

On 26 September 2013, the decision to start was made, and on 11 July 2014, the draft planning procedure was shown, followed by the final planning procedure on 18 December 2014. Construction is planned for completion around 2020.

There are plans to allow more capacity between Leidschendam and The Hague-Zuid due to the traffic congestion between the Ypenburg and Prins Clausplein interchanges, because of the development of the Rotterdam and The Hague regions. There are also plans for the A4 to make The Hague less reliant on the Utrechtsebaan.

On 15 May 2012, the draft rijksstructuurvisie was determined, and on 21 November 2012, the final rijksstructuurvisie followed. The plans are to change this part of the A4 between 2020 and 2023.

=== Benelux-Klaaswaal missing link ===
At this point in time, there is no motorway between interchange Benelux and the A29 near Klaaswaal. However, an extension of the A4 southwards is possible without changing the layout of the Benelux interchange. This missing section was already approved by the government in 1961, as part of the then-called Road 19, and space was reserved by the government in 2005. By constructing this missing link, the A4 would be one continuously running road from the Kethelplein interchange, west of the city of Rotterdam, to the Belgian border. It would also relieve the A15 and A29 from traffic jams, since they currently serve as a link between the two sections of the A4.

Supporters of the planned 12-kilometer-long motorway state that cities like Hoogvliet, Spijkenisse, Barendrecht and Rotterdam would be significantly less congested, and that overall traffic flow would be restored. Opponents, among which are environmentalists, state that the construction of the missing link would only result in more traffic and thus more congestion, leading to negative environmental effects. Since the A15 and the A29 are currently being widened, this section of the A4 seems more and more unlikely to be built.

The motorway section between Klaaswaal and the Sabina interchange near Dinteloord is currently known and designated as the A29, but the intention is to include it in the A4 motorway and designate it as such in the future. When the missing link between interchange Benelux and Klaaswaal is completed, this section will be renumbered to the A4, in order to create a continuously numbered motorway between the Kethelplein interchange and the Belgian border. As of 2026, this section of road is still being numbered as the A29 to avoid confusion.

== Exit list ==
Country	Province	Municipality	km	mi	Exit	Destinations	Notes
Netherlands	North Holland	Amsterdam	0	0.0	—	E19 east / E22 north / A 10 north and east – Amsterdam	Northern terminus of northern segment of the A4; north end of E19 overlap
Netherlands	North Holland	Amsterdam	2	1.2	1	Anderlechtlaan	
Netherlands	North Holland	Haarlemmermeer	4	2.5	—	A 9 – Badhoevedorp, Amstelveen	
Netherlands	North Holland	Haarlemmermeer	7	4.3	2	Ceintuurbaan Zuid / Westelijke Randweg / Schiphol Boulevard	
Netherlands	North Holland	Haarlemmermeer	11	6.8	—	A 5 north – Zaanstad, Haarlem	Northbound exit and southbound entrance only
Netherlands	North Holland	Haarlemmermeer	11	6.8	3	N 201 – Aalsmeer, Hoofddorp	
Netherlands	North Holland	Haarlemmermeer	18	11	4	N 207 – Nieuw Vennep, Leimuiden	
Netherlands	North Holland	Haarlemmermeer	18	11	—	A 44 southwest – Sassenheim, Oegstgeest	Southbound exit and northbound entrance only
Netherlands	South Holland	Alkemade	23	14	5	Provincialeweg / Veenderveld / Alkemadelaan to Roelofarendsveen	
Netherlands	South Holland	Jacobswoude	29	18	6	N 446 – Hoogsmade, Leiderdorp	
Netherlands	South Holland	Zoeterwoude	33	21	6a	N 11 / Willem van der Madeweg – Zoeterwoude-Rijndijk, Alphen aan den Rijn, Leiden	
Netherlands	South Holland	Zoeterwoude	35	22	7	N 206 – Zoeterwoude-Dorp, Leiden	
Netherlands	South Holland	Leidschendam-Voorburg	44	27	8	N 14 / Zoetermeerse Rijweg – Leidschendam, Leidschenveen	
Netherlands	South Holland	Leidschendam-Voorburg	46	29	—	E30 southwest and east / A 12 – The Hague, Zoetermeer	North end of E30 overlap
Netherlands	South Holland	The Hague	47	29	—	E19 southeast / E30 / A 13 – Delft, Rijswijk	Southbound entrance through intersection with traffic lights; south end of E19 overlap
Netherlands	South Holland	Rijswijk	48	30	9	Laan van Delfvliet to Rijswijk	
Netherlands	South Holland	Rijswijk	49	30	10	Diepenhorstlaan northwest to Rijswijk	
Netherlands	South Holland	Rijswijk	51	32	11	Pr. Beatrixlaan to Rijswijk / Delft	
Netherlands	South Holland	The Hague	53	33	12	E30 / N 211 – Den Haag-Zuid, Delft	South end of E30 overlap
Netherlands	South Holland	Midden-Delfland	55	34	13	N 233 / Woudseweg – Den Hoorn, De Lier	
Netherlands	South Holland	Delft	57	35	14	N 470 east (Kruithuisweg) – Delft	
Netherlands	South Holland	Schiedam	70	43	—	E25 / A 20 – Schiedam, Vlaardingen, Rotterdam	
Netherlands	South Holland	Vlaardingen	72	45	16	Vlaardingerdijk / Schiedamsedijk to Vlaardingen-Oost / Schiedam-West	
Netherlands	South Holland	Rotterdam	75	47	17	Gaderingviaduct/ Hoefsmidstraat / Vondelingenweg to Poortugaal / Hoogvliet / Pernis	Northbound entrance and southbound exit only
Netherlands	South Holland	Rotterdam	76	47	—	A 15 – Spijkenisse, Charlois, Barendrecht	Southern terminus of middle segment of A4
Netherlands	South Holland	Benelux-Klaaswaal gap					
Netherlands	South Holland	Hoeksche Waard	23– 90	14– 56	—	A 29 northeast – Oud-Beijerland, Blaaksedijk	North end of A29 road designation; A29 also continues further northeastward, separate from future A4 towards interchange Benelux
Netherlands	South Holland	Hoeksche Waard	93	58	22	N 487 / Provincialeweg – Numansdorp, Zuid-Beijerland	
Netherlands	South Holland	Goeree-Overflakkee	99	62	—	A 59 south / N 59 west – Oude-Tonge	North end of A59 overlap
Netherlands	North Brabant	Moerdijk	102	63	23	Maltaweg to Willemstad	
Netherlands	North Brabant	Moerdijk	210– 104	130– 65	—	A 59 east	South end of A29 road designation; south end of A59 overlap
Netherlands	North Brabant	Steenbergen	215	134	24	N 268 / Noordlangeweg – Dinteloord, Stampersgat	
Netherlands	North Brabant	Steenbergen	223	139	25	N 257 / Zeelandweg-Oost – Steenbergen, Nieuw-Vossermeer	
Netherlands	North Brabant	Bergen op Zoom	229	142	26	N 259 north / N 286 west – Steenbergen, Halsteren, Tholen	
Netherlands	North Brabant	Bergen op Zoom	233	145	27	Randweg Noord west to Bergen op Zoom-Noord	
Netherlands	North Brabant	Bergen op Zoom	234	145	—	E312 east / A 58 – Heerle, Wouw, Roosendaal	North end of E312 and A58 overlap
Netherlands	North Brabant	Bergen op Zoom	235	146	28	Rooseveltlaan west to Bergen op Zoom	
Netherlands	North Brabant	Bergen op Zoom	236	147	29	Huijbergsebaan to Bergen op Zoom-Zuid	
Netherlands	North Brabant	Woensdrecht	241	150	30	N 289 – Hoogerheide	
Netherlands	North Brabant	Woensdrecht	243	151	—	E312 west / A 58 – Rilland, Goes	South end of E312 and A58 overlap
Netherlands-Belgium country line	North Brabant-Antwerp province line	Woensdrecht-Antwerp municipality line	250	160	11	N101 / Hollandseweg / Antwerspebaan – Zandvliet	Only start of northbound entrance and southbound exit on Dutch soil, other parts on Belgian soil
Netherlands-Belgium country line	North Brabant-Antwerp province line	Woensdrecht-Antwerp municipality line	251	156	—	A12 south – Antwerp	Border with Belgium; this road continues as the Belgian A12
1.000 mi = 1.609 km; 1.000 km = 0.621 mi: Concurrency terminus; Incomplete access; Route transition; Unopened

== See also ==
- List of motorways in the Netherlands
- List of E-roads in the Netherlands
