= Steenbergen =

- Municipality
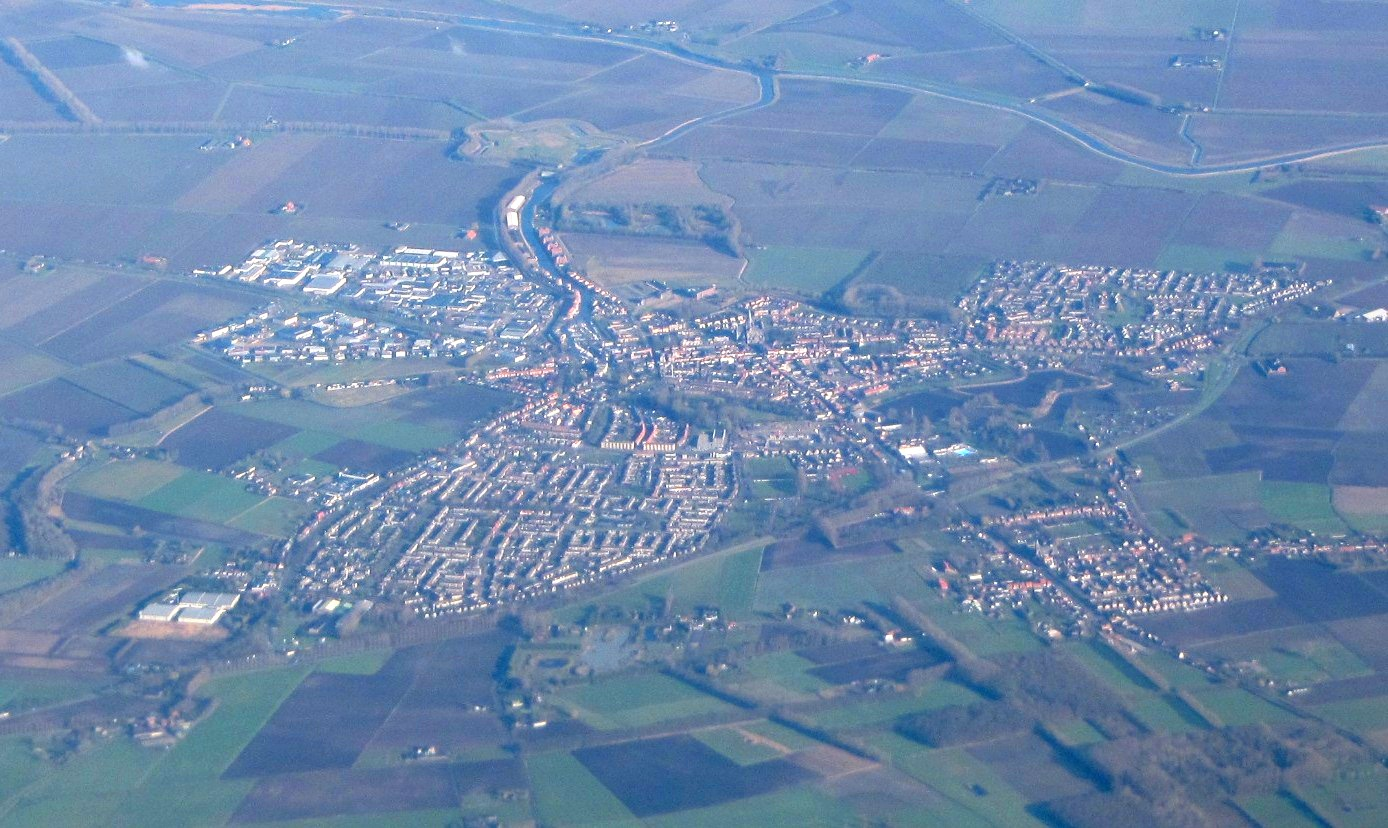
- Aerial view of Steenbergen

- Flag Coat of arms

- Location in North Brabant
- Coordinates: 51°35′N 4°19′E
- Country: Netherlands
- Province: North Brabant

Government
  - Body: Municipal council
  - Mayor: Ruud van den Belt (VVD)

Area
  - Total: 159.14 km^{2} (61.44 sq mi)
  - Land: 146.43 km^{2} (56.54 sq mi)
  - Water: 12.71 km^{2} (4.91 sq mi)
- Elevation: 1 m (3.3 ft)

Population (January 2021)
  - Total: 24,310
  - Density: 166/km^{2} (430/sq mi)
- Demonym: Steenbergenaar
- Time zone: UTC+1 (CET)
  - Summer (DST): UTC+2 (CEST)
- Postcode: 4650–4655, 4670–4671, 4680–4681, 4756
- Area code: 0167
- Website: gemeente-steenbergen.nl

Steenbergen (Dutch pronunciation: [ˈsteːnbɛrɣə(n)]) is a municipality and a town in the province of North Brabant in the south of the Netherlands. The municipality had a population of 24,310 in 2021 and covers an area of 159.14 km^{2} (61.44 sq mi) of which 12.71 km^{2} (4.91 sq mi) is water. The municipality is mainly agricultural including a strongly growing greenhouse sector, but Steenbergen and the nearby town of Dinteloord also contain some light industry. An extension of the A4 motorway, opened in 2014, increased the municipality's attractiveness, aiding connections with the large cities of Rotterdam to the north and the Belgian city of Antwerp to the south. Connection with the nearby city of Bergen op Zoom was also improved.

== Population centres ==
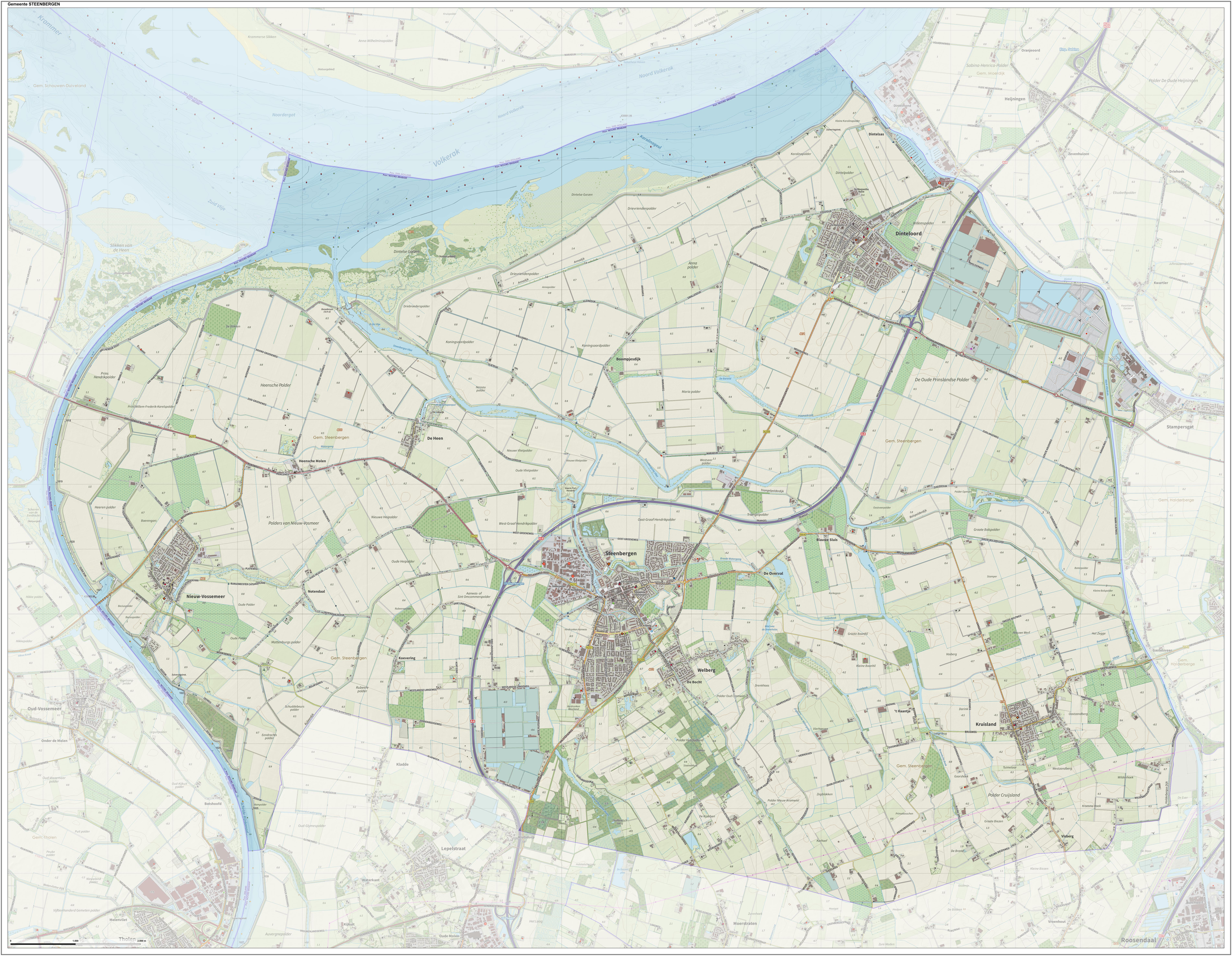
Map of Steenbergen, June 2015

- Steenbergen (population: 12,440)
- Dinteloord (5,680)
- Nieuw-Vossemeer (2,400)
- Kruisland (2,340)
- Welberg (1,118)
- De Heen (440)
- t'Haantje

== The city of Steenbergen ==
Steenbergen received city rights in 1272.

== Graves of Guy Gibson and Jim Warwick ==
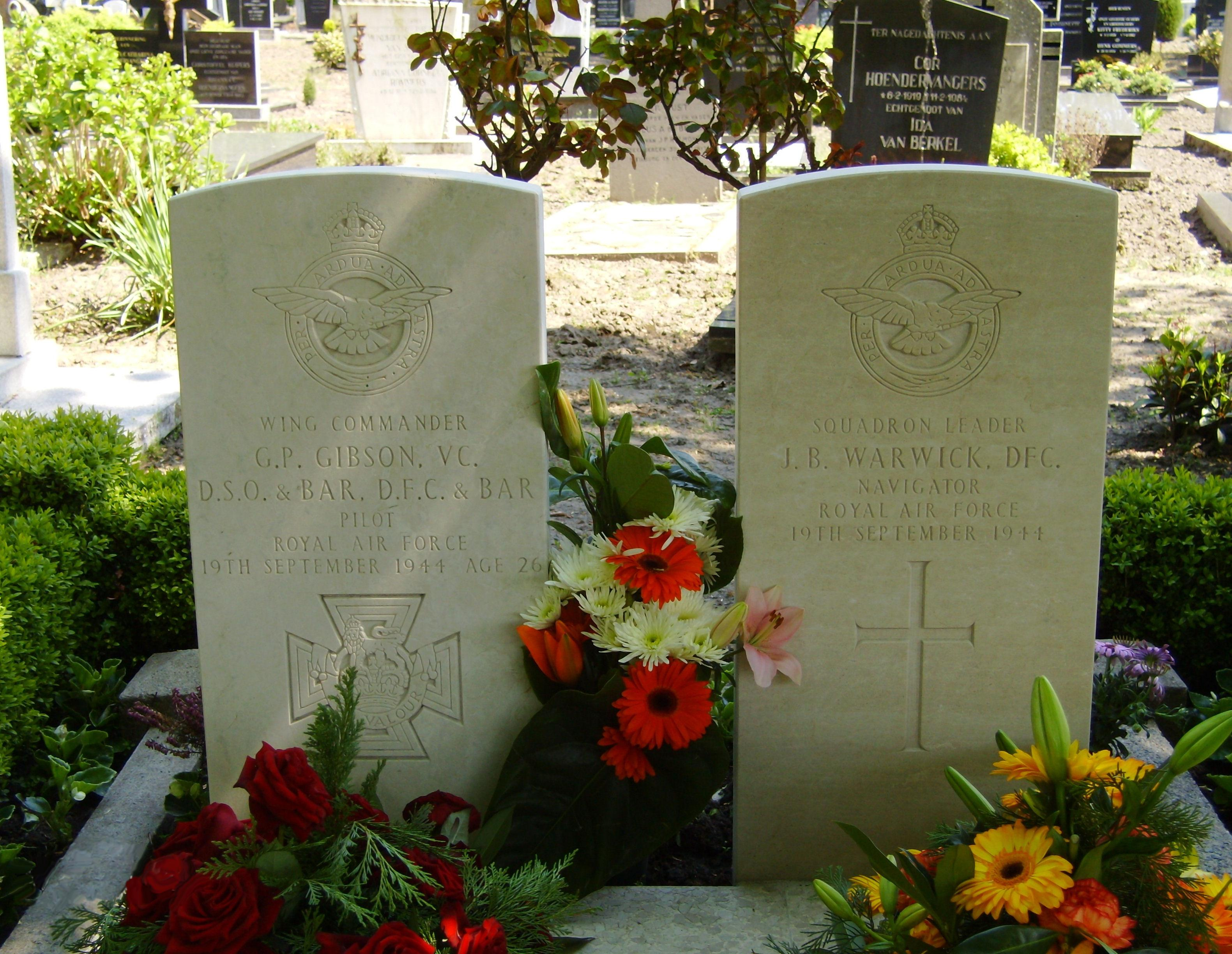
Graves of RAF Wing Commanders Guy Gibson and Jim Warwick

Guy Gibson, Wing Commander and the first CO of the RAF's 617 Squadron which he led in the "Dam Busters" raid in 1943, crashed with his Mosquito aircraft in this municipality. Having returned to operational duties in 1944 after pestering Bomber Command, 26-year-old Gibson was killed along with his navigator, Sqn Ldr Jim Warwick, on a bombing raid on Rheydt (nowadays a borough of Mönchengladbach) operating as a Pathfinder Master Bomber based at RAF Coningsby, when his de Havilland Mosquito XX, KB267, crashed near Steenbergen on 19 September 1944. It was assumed for years that he had been shot down, but following the discovery of the wreckage it was found that a fault with the fuel tank selector possibly meant the aircraft simply ran out of fuel. An eye-witness account detailed how his aircraft circled Steenbergen and heard its engines 'splutter and stop'. In 2011 it was revealed the Mosquito may also have been shot down in a friendly fire incident. The graves are in the RC cemetery of Steenbergen. Streets have been named for both Gibson and Warwick, and one of the aircraft's propellers is located in the city park as a memorial.

== Notable people ==
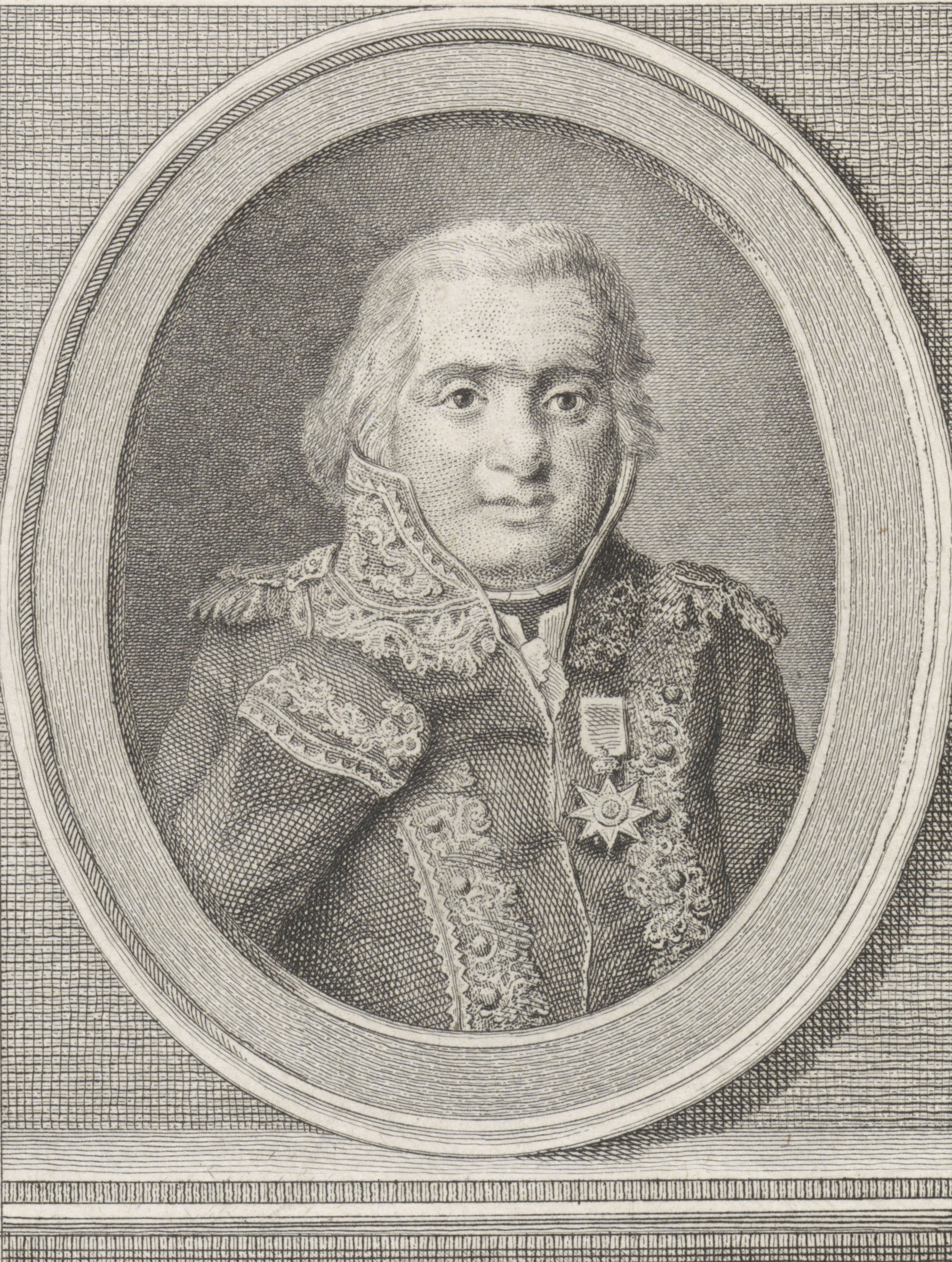
Bloys van Treslong, 1807

- Johan Arnold Bloys van Treslong (1757 in Steenbergen – 1824) a Dutch naval officer and Patriot
- Jan Maas (1900 in Steenbergen – 1977) a Dutch racing cyclist who competed in the 1924 and the 1928 Summer Olympics
- Johnny Goverde (1933 in Steenbergen – 2025), a singer and songwriter known under the pseudonym Jan Boezeroen.
- Niel Steenbergen (1911 in Steenbergen – 1997) an artist, sculptor, painter and medalist
- Mimi Aarden (1924 in Steenbergen – 2013), operatic mezzo-soprano
- Ella Vogelaar (1949 in Steenbergen – 2019) a retired politician
- Pierre van Hooijdonk (born 1969 in Steenbergen) a retired Dutch international footballer with 551 club caps
- Eric Hellemons (born 1971 in Kruisland) a former footballer with 358 club caps and current football coach,
- Nasrdin Dchar (born 1978 in Steenbergen) a Moroccan-Dutch actor and presenter

== Gallery ==
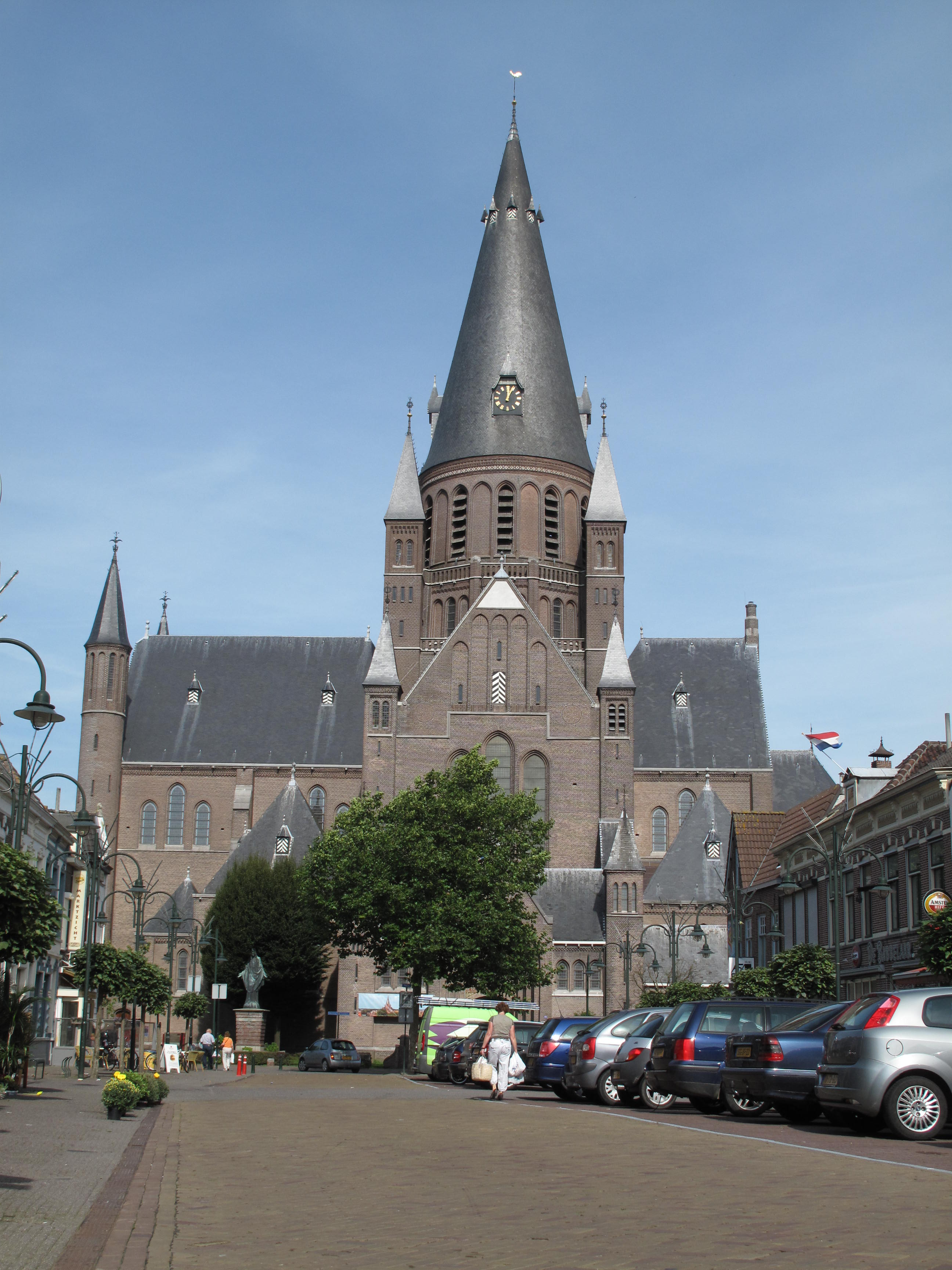
Steenbergen, church: St. Gummaruskerk

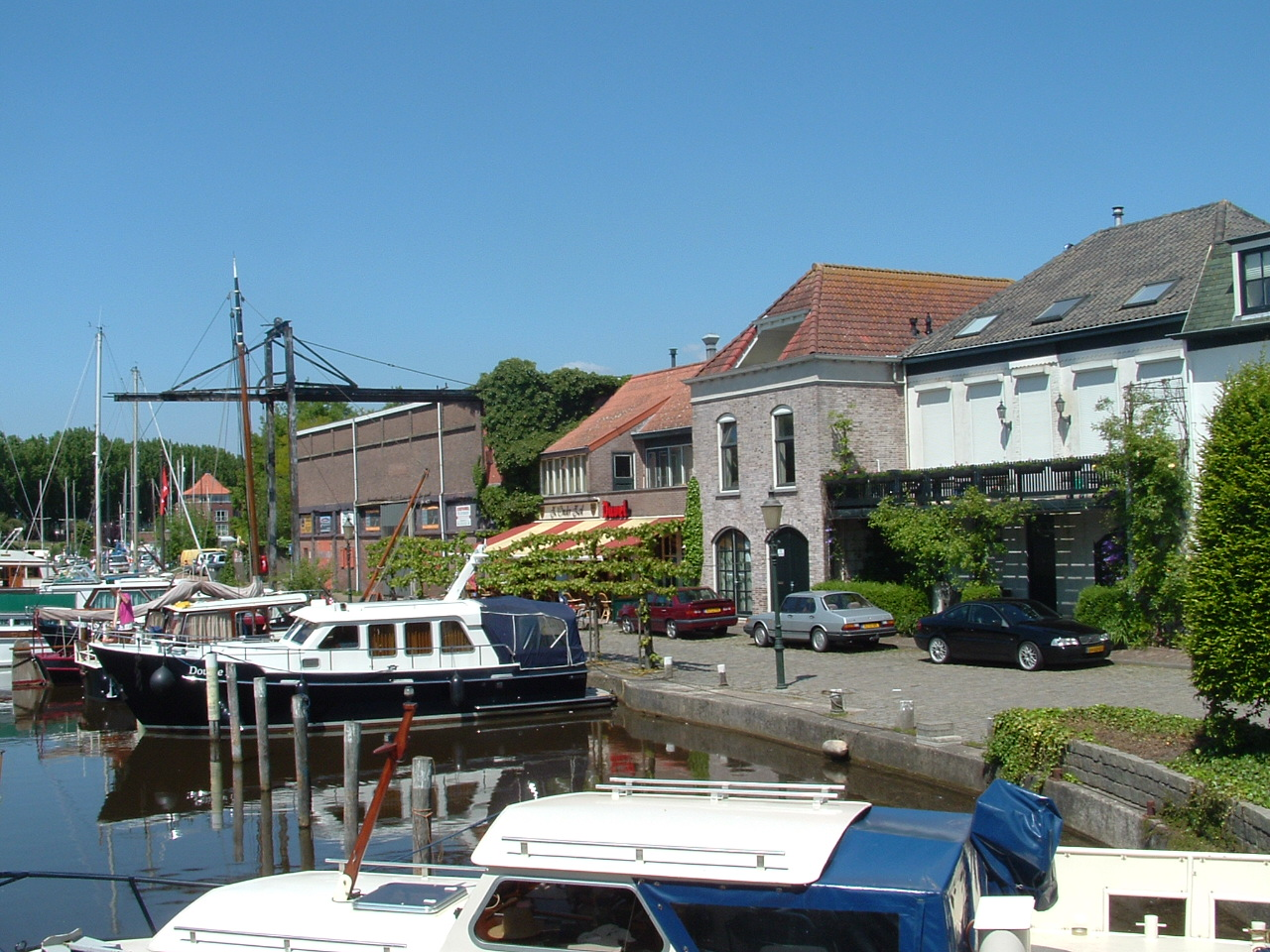
Front view of the inner harbour of Steenbergen

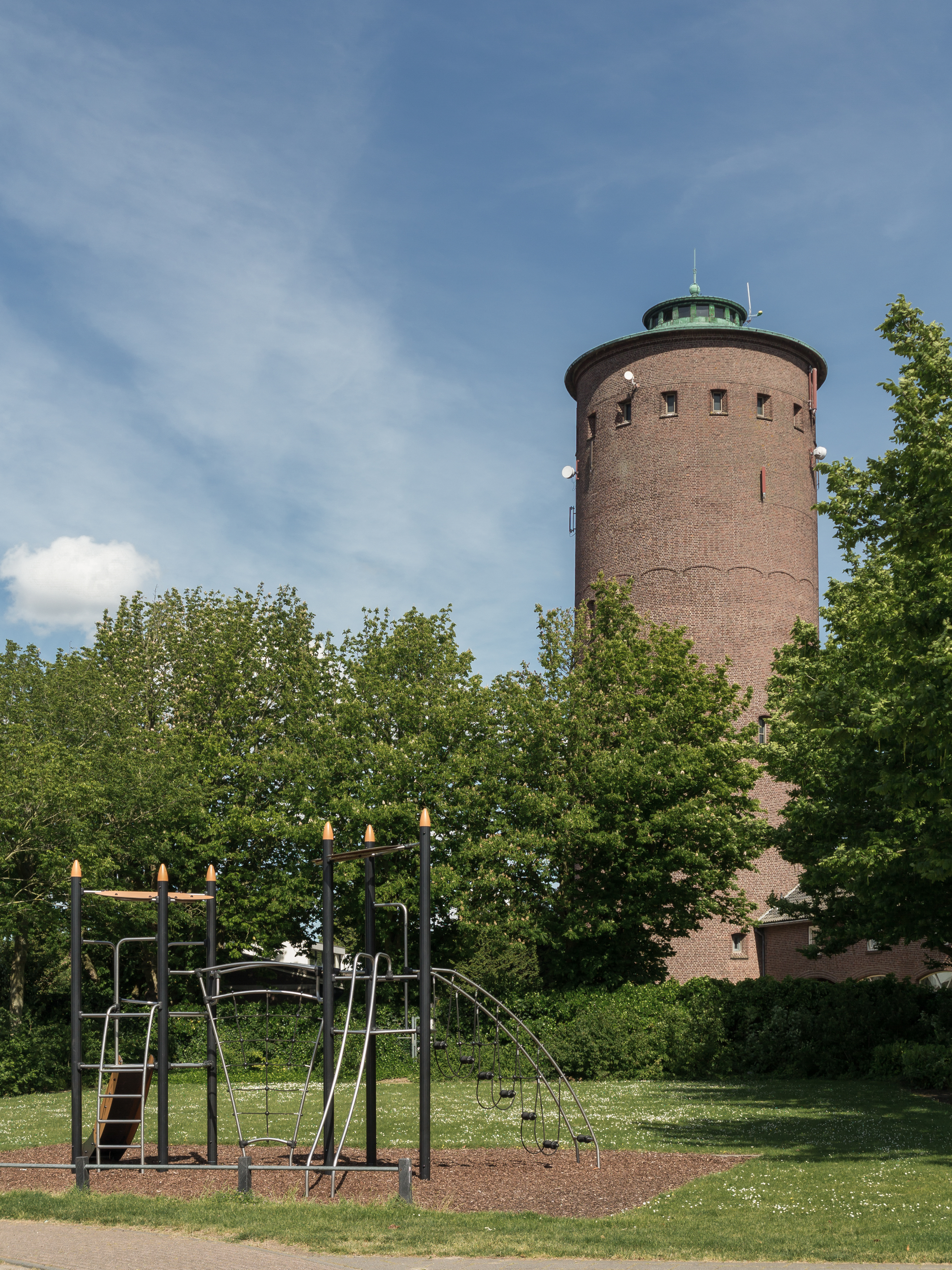
Steenbergen, watertower

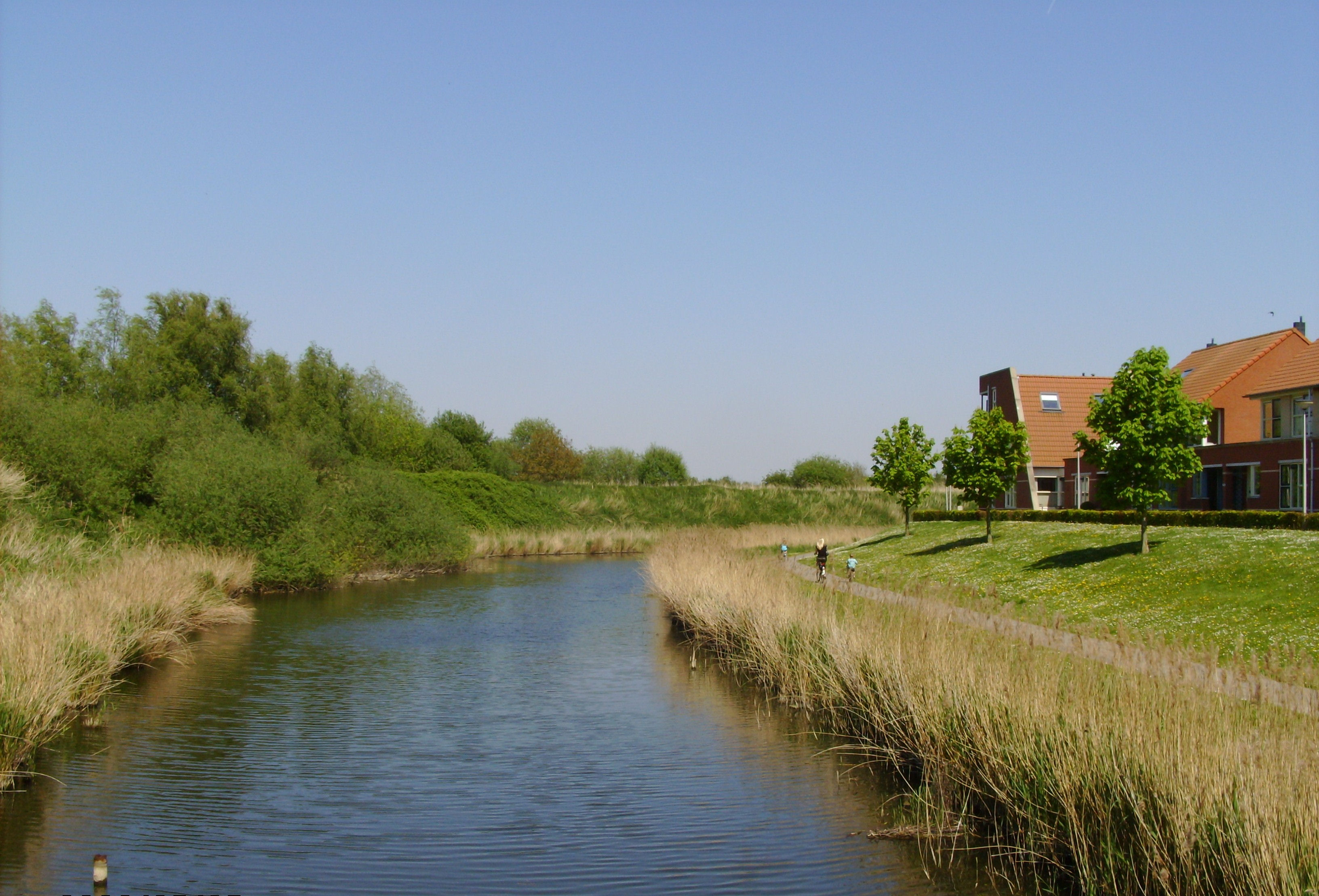
Northern City Dike, Steenbergen

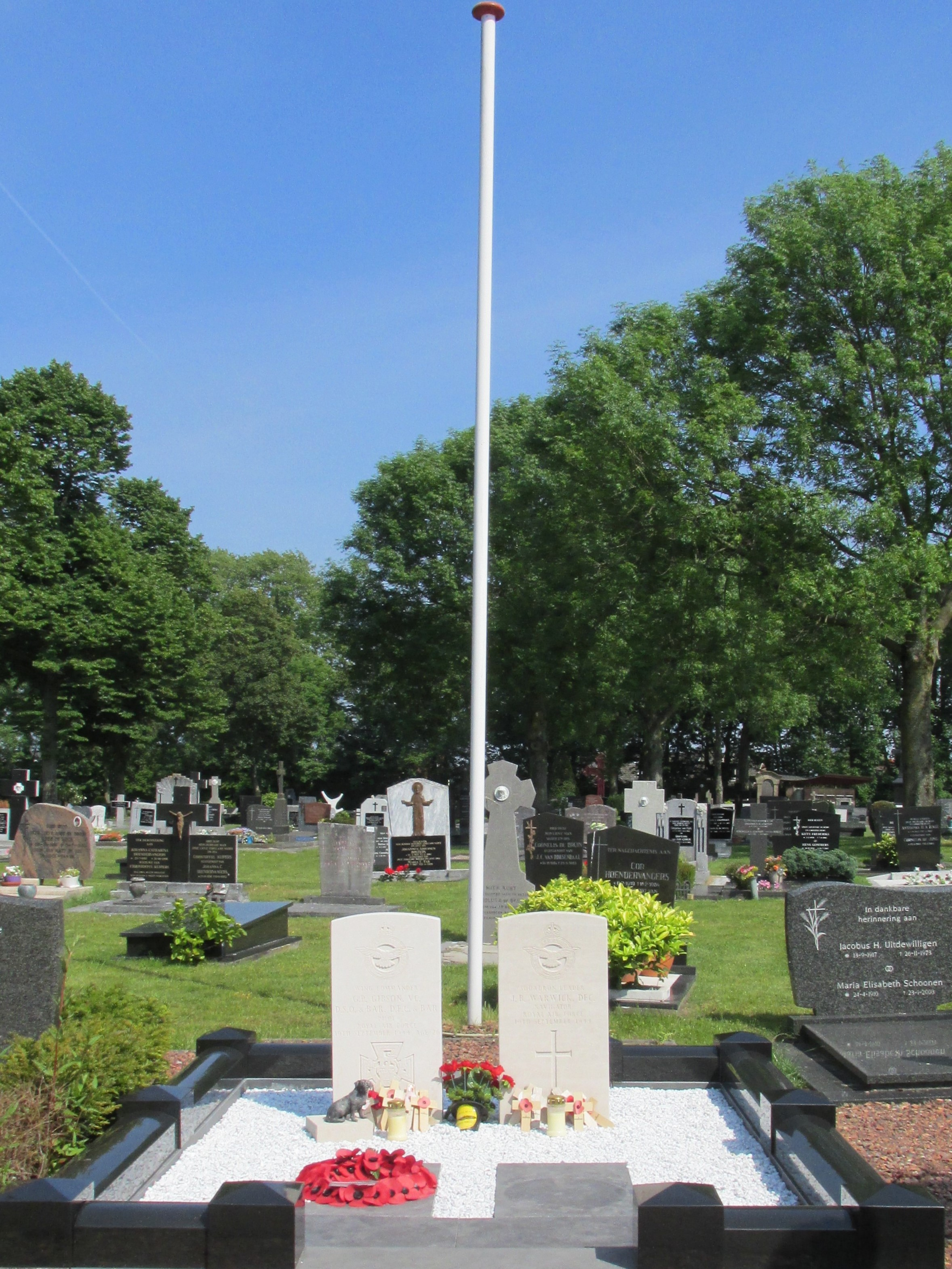
Gibson and Warwick

== See also ==
- Dinteloord en Prinsenland
