= 't Haantje, North Brabant =

't Haantje
- Hamlet
- Location in the province of North Brabant in the Netherlands 't Haantje (Netherlands)
- Coordinates: 51°34′9″N 4°23′0″E
- Country: Netherlands
- Province: North Brabant
- Municipality: Steenbergen
- Time zone: UTC+1 (CET)
  - Summer (DST): UTC+2 (CEST)
- Postal code: 4651
- Dialing code: 0167

't Haantje (Dutch pronunciation: [ət ˈɦaːɲtɕə]) is a hamlet in the Dutch province of North Brabant. It is located in the municipality of Steenbergen, about 2 km west of Kruisland.

't Haantje is not a statistical entity, and the postal authorities have placed it under Steenbergen. It has no place name signs, and was named after the inn Het Hanengevecht. The hamlet consists of about 20 houses.
