= Aircraft bridge =

Type of bridge

Coordinates: 40.0002°N 82.9052°W

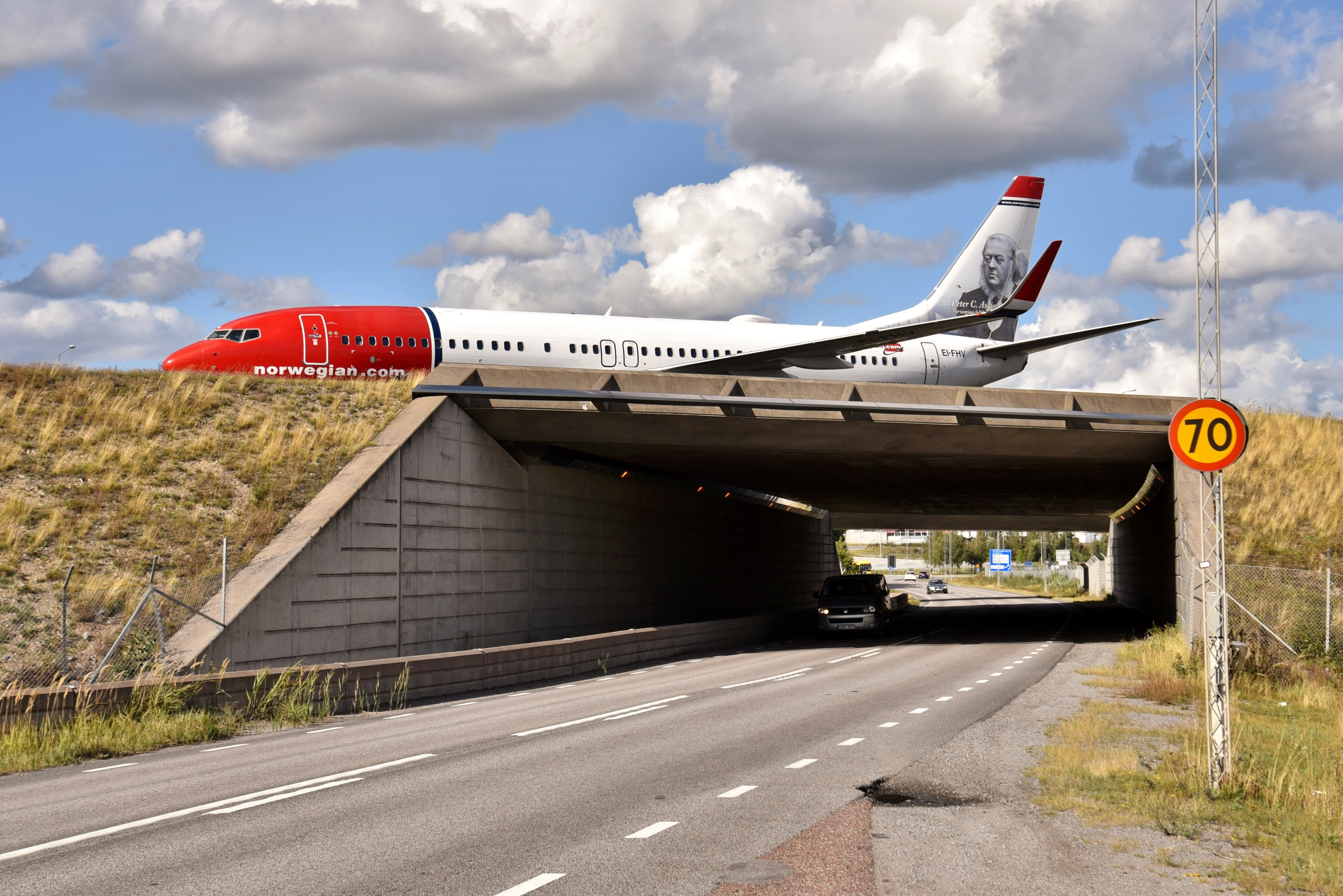
Aircraft bridge over Swedish county road 273 at Stockholm Arlanda Airport, Sweden

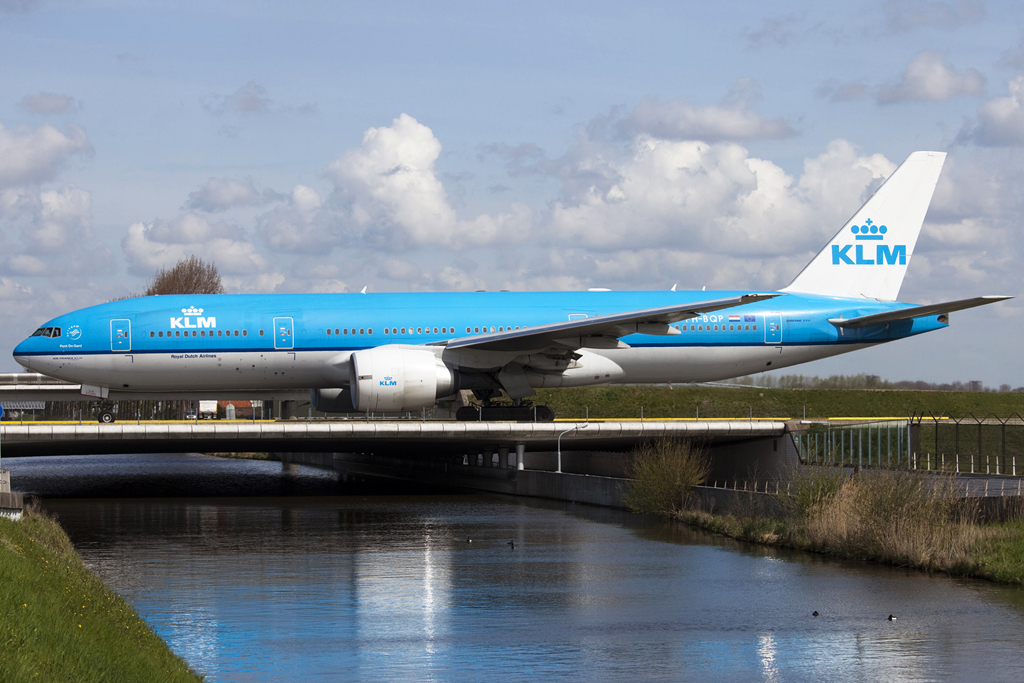
Aircraft bridge over the Main Canal at Amsterdam Airport Schiphol, the Netherlands

Aircraft bridges, including taxiway bridges and runway bridges, bring aircraft traffic over motorways, railways, and waterways.

== Construction ==
Aircraft bridges must be designed to support the heaviest aircraft that may cross them, or that will cross them in the future. In 1963, a taxiway bridge at O'Hare International Airport, one of the busiest airports in the world, was planned to handle future aircraft weighing 365,000 pounds (166,000 kg), but aircraft weights doubled within two years of its construction. Currently, the largest passenger aircraft in the world, the Airbus A380, has a maximum take-off weight (MTOW) of 575 t (1,268,000 lb).

The largest Boeing planes, i.e. the current "Project Ozark" versions of the Boeing 747-8, are approaching MTOW of greater than 1,000,000 lb (450,000 kg). Aircraft bridges must be designed for the substantial forces exerted by aircraft braking, affecting the lateral load in substructure design. Braking force of 70 percent of the live load is assumed in two recent taxiway bridge designs. And "deck design is more apt to be controlled by punching shear than flexure due to the heavy wheel loads."

Taxiway bridges are unusually wide relative to their length, and aircraft loading cannot be assumed to be distributed evenly to a bridge superstructure's web, so different modeling is required in these bridges' structural design. In cold climates, provisions for anti-icing must be made. In the U.S., regulations of the Federal Aviation Administration must be met. And there are various other differences versus typical bridges covered by AASHTO standards.

A major issue is that closing an airport for construction even temporarily is impossible.

Major alternatives considered for construction of a taxiway bridge in 2008 were:

- use of precast, prestressed concrete I-girders
- use of precast, prestressed concrete box girders
- use of steel girders
- cast-in-place, post-tensioned concrete box girder bridge.

Finite Element Analysis has been advocated for, or applied in, taxiway bridge design since at least 1963.

== List of taxiway bridges, runway bridges, and related tunnels ==
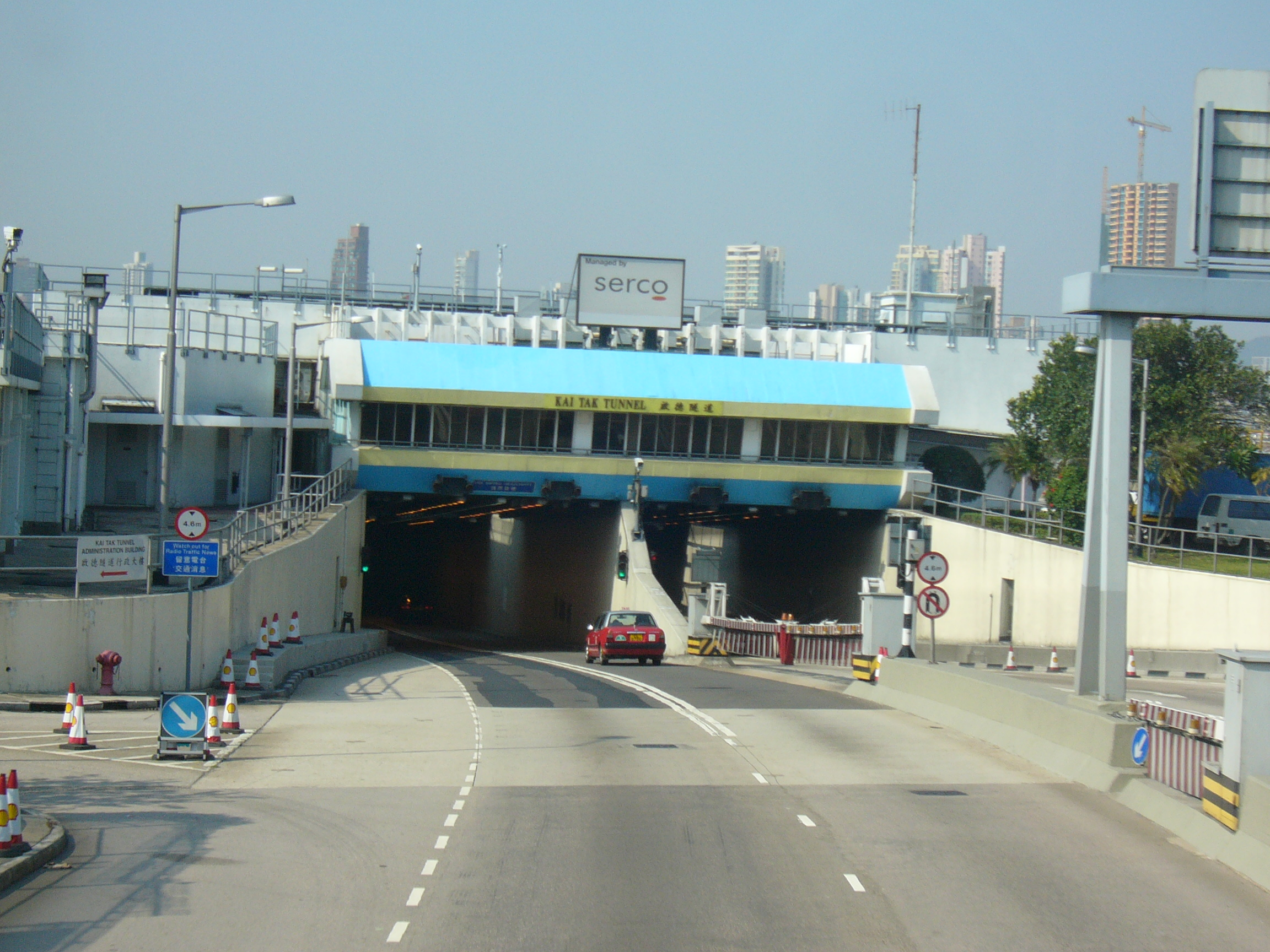
Kai Tak Tunnel east entrance, near the old Kai Tak airport

Taxiway bridges and runway bridges are bridges at airports to bring airplane taxiways and runways across motorways, railroads, or waterways. A taxiway bridge must be designed to carry the weight of the maximum size airplanes crossing and perhaps stopping directly upon it. A runway bridge is similar but may have different stresses. Alternatively, a motorway may be brought by tunnel underneath one or more runways and taxiways.

Examples include:

- Dallas Fort Worth International Airport (DFW) has twelve taxiway bridges over roadways.
- Part of the taxiway and one runway of Allegheny County Airport in Pittsburgh, Pennsylvania is built on a bridge over Pennsylvania Route 885 and two sets of tracks of the Union Railroad (Pittsburgh).
- At Amsterdam Schiphol Airport, the 650-metre (2,130 ft) Schiphol tunnel takes the A4 motorway underneath an airplane runway and two taxiways. In 2003, a sixth runway was added at quite some distance west of the rest of airport, with use of two connecting taxiway bridges crossing the A5 motorway and the Main Canal, respectively.
- Athens International Airport has two taxiways running on two bridges over the A64 motorway.
- Five taxiway bridges, Beijing Capital Airport.
- Chung Cheung Road and South Runway Road in Chek Lap Kok.
- Eastern Vehicular Tunnel in Chek Lap Kok.
- A 1967-built steel girder taxiway bridge at O'Hare International Airport crosses over Interstate 190 in between Terminals 3 and 5. In 1963, the weight thought to be necessary was 365,000 pounds (166,000 kg) for the 1967 built bridge. In 1969, aircraft weights had doubled. It was a 4-span welded steel girder bridge with a concrete deck, 226 feet (69 m) long, 125 feet (38 m) wide, bridge. Maximum stress for the bridge was found to occur when an aircraft was 6 feet off the centerline.
- The Copenhagen Airport has one runway and one taxiway running over the Denmark 221 road.
- Düsseldorf International Airport has the approach end of runway 23L and the last taxiway out of the same runway 05R above a railway line. The Düsseldorf Airport Station offers a very good view of passing aircraft.
- Fort Lauderdale-Hollywood International Airport has US Route 1 and an active railroad running under a runway and taxiway.
- Fu Hsing North Road [zh-tw] in Taipei.
- Haneda Airport's runway 04/22 over Bayshore Route (Shuto Expressway); runway 16R/34L over Tokyo Metropolitan Route 311, Tokyo Monorail and Keikyu Airport Line; two taxiway bridges to runway 05/23 (D runway).
- Hartsfield-Jackson Atlanta International Airport's Runway 10/28 crosses over Interstate 285. (and see Engineering News and American Contract Journal?)
- Heathrow Airports main entranceway to Tunnel Road East runs under a runway and two taxiways.
- HKIA APM between the main Terminal One and the Midfield Concourse.
- Hua Hin Airport's runway crossed over Phet Kasem Road (Thailand Route 4) and Southern Railway Line.
- Indira Gandhi International Airport in Delhi operates two elevated taxiways.
- At Indianapolis International Airport, a taxiway bridge was planned to connect a future fourth runway across Interstate 70. During 2002-04, the Indiana Department of Transportation realigned I-70 to accommodate this.
- John Glenn Columbus International Airport in Columbus, Ohio has a $10.5 million called Port Columbus Airport Crossover Taxiway.
- Kai Tak Taxiway Bridge No. 3, a fast-track design-and-build contract awarded in 1993, at Hong Kong's Kai Tak Airport, which closed in 1998. It is now repurposed as a road connecting Kai Tak Cruise Terminal and Shing Fung Road and Shing Cheung Road, which is now named Kai Tak Bridge.
- Kai Tak Airport's northwestern end of first-generation of 13/31 runway, across Choi Hung Road (then part of Clear Water Bay Road) and Kai Tak Nullah.
- Kai Tak Nullah has several bridges across to the northeast apron.
- Kai Tak Tunnel in New Kowloon.
- King Khalid International Airport in Riyadh, Saudi Arabia.
- At Los Angeles International Airport, a tunnel was completed in 1953 allowing Sepulveda Boulevard to revert to straight and pass beneath the two runways; it was the first tunnel of its kind.
- At Manchester Airport in the United Kingdom, the A538 road runs in a pair of twin-bore tunnels underneath the southern ends of both runways.
- Macau International Airport off Taipa has taxiways.
- Molde Airport, Norway, has a proper road tunnel under the runway.
- B Runway (16L/34R) of Narita Airport over Chiba Prefectural Road and Ibaraki Prefectural Road Route 44.
- Oakland International Airport has an underpass for Ron Cowan Parkway below a taxiway connecting the commercial runways to the general aviation North Field.
- The Orlando International Airport authority, planning for a future high-speed rail line, invested in extra length for its taxiway bridges over its southern airport access road.
- Taxiway bridge over Interstate 73, Piedmont Triad International Airport in Greensboro, North Carolina.
- Sandane, Trondheim and Tromsø airports in Norway have such bridges.
- S. 188th Street runs under a runway and a taxiway of Seattle-Tacoma International Airport.
- Singapore Changi Airport has two taxiway bridges spanning Airport Boulevard. These bridges required shields installed on either side to protect the road from the jet blast. Planning for it since the 1990s, the airport spent $60 million in total in modifications to support the Airbus A380.
- $35 million Taxiway Sierra Underpass reconstruction at Sky Harbor International Airport in Phoenix, Arizona included a $13 million five-span, cast-in-place, post-tensioned concrete box girder bridge. The airport also has the Taxiway Tango Underpass.
- The Soekarno–Hatta International Airport has two taxiway bridges located in the southwest corner of the airport connecting the north and the south runway and a third taxiway bridge located in the northeast corner was under construction, scheduled to have finished in 2018.
- Runway 17R/35L at the defunct Stapleton International Airport in Denver crossed over Interstate 70.
- The third runway of the Stockholm Arlanda Airport is reached from the main terminal area by two taxiway bridges constructed to be able to handle the heaviest and largest airplanes in traffic.
- Taxiway B Bridge, Tampa International Airport.
