= Eric Hellemons =

Dutch footballer

Personal information
- Date of birth: June 2, 1971 (age 55)
- Place of birth: Kruisland, Netherlands
- Position: Defender

Team information
- Current team: Pro Vercelli (techn. mngr)

Youth career
- SC Kruisland

Senior career*
Years	Team	Apps	(Gls)
1988–2005	RBC	357	(9)

Managerial career
- 2006–2011: RBC (assistant)
- 2011–2012: Gençlerbirliği (assistant)
- 2012: Hoek
- 2013–2014: SC Gastel
- 2014–2015: NAC (caretaker)
- 2016–2022: NAC (academy)
- 2023: Dordrecht (academy)
- 2023-2024: Beveren (assistant)
- 2024-2026: Willem II (academy)
- 2026-: Pro Vercelli (techn. manager)
- * Club domestic league appearances and goals

Eric Hellemons (born 2 June 1971) is a Dutch former footballer and current football coach.

== Playing career ==
A former defender, Hellemons played in the youth at SC Kruisland before he arrived at RBC Roosendaal. Between 1988 and 2005 he played 358 matches in the first team, also captaining the club, and owns the club record as the player with the highest number of played games.

== Coaching career ==
After retiring, he stayed at RBC as a coaching staff member, serving since January 2006 as assistant coach. In June 2011 he was about to be named as new head coach, a move that did not come to fruition as the club went bankrupt. Hellemons then agreed to pair with former RBC manager Fuat Çapa as assistant coach at Gençlerbirliği SK in Turkey.

In June 2012 he was named new head coach of Dutch amateur club HSV Hoek, a position he maintained just until November of the same year. In January 2013, it was announced he would become new head coach of Derde Klasse amateurs SC Gastel, effective from July 2013; he left his role in October 2014.

In July 2014 he joined Eredivisie club NAC Breda as an assistant coach, while maintaining his role as head coach at SC Gastel. In October 2014, Hellemons was named caretaker manager of NAC Breda following the dismissal of Nebojša Gudelj. He returned to childhood club SC Kruisland in 2023 to become their coach.

In 2024 he was named Head of Willem II's academy, only to leave them after two years to become technical manager at Italian side Pro Vercelli.
