= A5 motorway (Netherlands) =

Freeway in the Netherlands

A5 motorway
- Rijksweg 5
- Location of the A5 motorway

Location
- Country: Kingdom of the Netherlands
- Constituent country: Netherlands

Highway system
- Roads in the Netherlands; Motorways; E-roads; Provincial; City routes

The A5 motorway is a motorway in the Netherlands. With a length of 17 kilometres (11 mi), it is one of the shortest motorways in the country.

== Overview ==
The A5 serves as a western by-pass for the city of Amsterdam, relieving the western part of the A10 motorway from through traffic towards Zaanstad and the northern part of the province. It also forms a shortcut between the A4 motorway and A9 motorway, reducing travel time and distance between The Hague and Haarlem and Alkmaar. This shortcut relieved the busy intersection Badhoevedorp. The current A5 was opened in two sections: the first on November 8, 2003 connecting the A4 with the A9 resulting in two new interchanges: interchange De Hoek (A4/A5) and interchange Raasdorp (A5/A9). This section of A5 has no exits, although there is an exit ramp towards Hoofddorp when heading south. Because this junction is located just before interchange De Hoek, it is considered to be part of the A4 and therefore has no exit number. The only object one comes across when driving on this part of the A5, is a short tunnel (the Rolbaantunnel) underneath the section connecting Schiphol Airport's Polderbaan runway (the most western runway of Schiphol) to the rest of the airport. Directly parallel to the A5 motorway, on its east, is another runway, the Zwanenburgbaan.

The second section of the A5 continues from interchange Raasdorp towards the western seaports of Amsterdam ("Westelijk Havengebied") and finally connects with the A10 just south of the Coentunnel. This interchange is part of the interchange Coenplein, which originally only connected the A10 with the A8 motorway at the north side of the tunnel. Now the interchange is in fact a double interchange with the tunnel in between. This section of the A5 opened in two stages. First, in December 2012 the section between interchange Raasdorp and the IJmuiden junction opened. In May 2013 the remaining part including the connection with the A10 opened. This part also includes one of the longest motorway viaducts of the Netherlands, giving motorists a panorama of the seaports.

== Future plans ==
In the future, a new part of Amsterdam might be built. This "Parkwijk" can be connected with the A5 by building a new junction between interchange Raasdorp en junction 2. Exit number 1 has been reserved for this possible new junction.

== Speed limit ==
Between interchange De Hoek and interchange Raasdorp the speed limit on the A5 is 130 km/h (81 mph). Between interchange Raasdorp and interchange Coenplein the speed limit is 100 km/h (62 mph).

== Exit list ==
The entire route is in North Holland Province.

Municipality	km	mi	Exit	Destinations	Notes
Haarlemmermeer	0	0.0	—	A 4 – Amsterdam, Leiden	No northbound exit
Haarlemmermeer	0	0.0	—	Hoofddorpdreef / Rozenburgdreef	Southbound exit and entrance only
Haarlemmermeer	6	3.7	—	A 9 – Haarlem, Badhoevedorp	
Amsterdam	12	7.5	2	N 202 / S 103 north – Westpoort	
Amsterdam	13	8.1	3	S 102 / Luvernes – Amsterdam, Westpoort	
Amsterdam	17	11	—	A 10 north – Zaandam, Amsterdam	Northbound exit and southbound entrance only
1.000 mi = 1.609 km; 1.000 km = 0.621 mi
