= Ooltgensplaat =

- Village
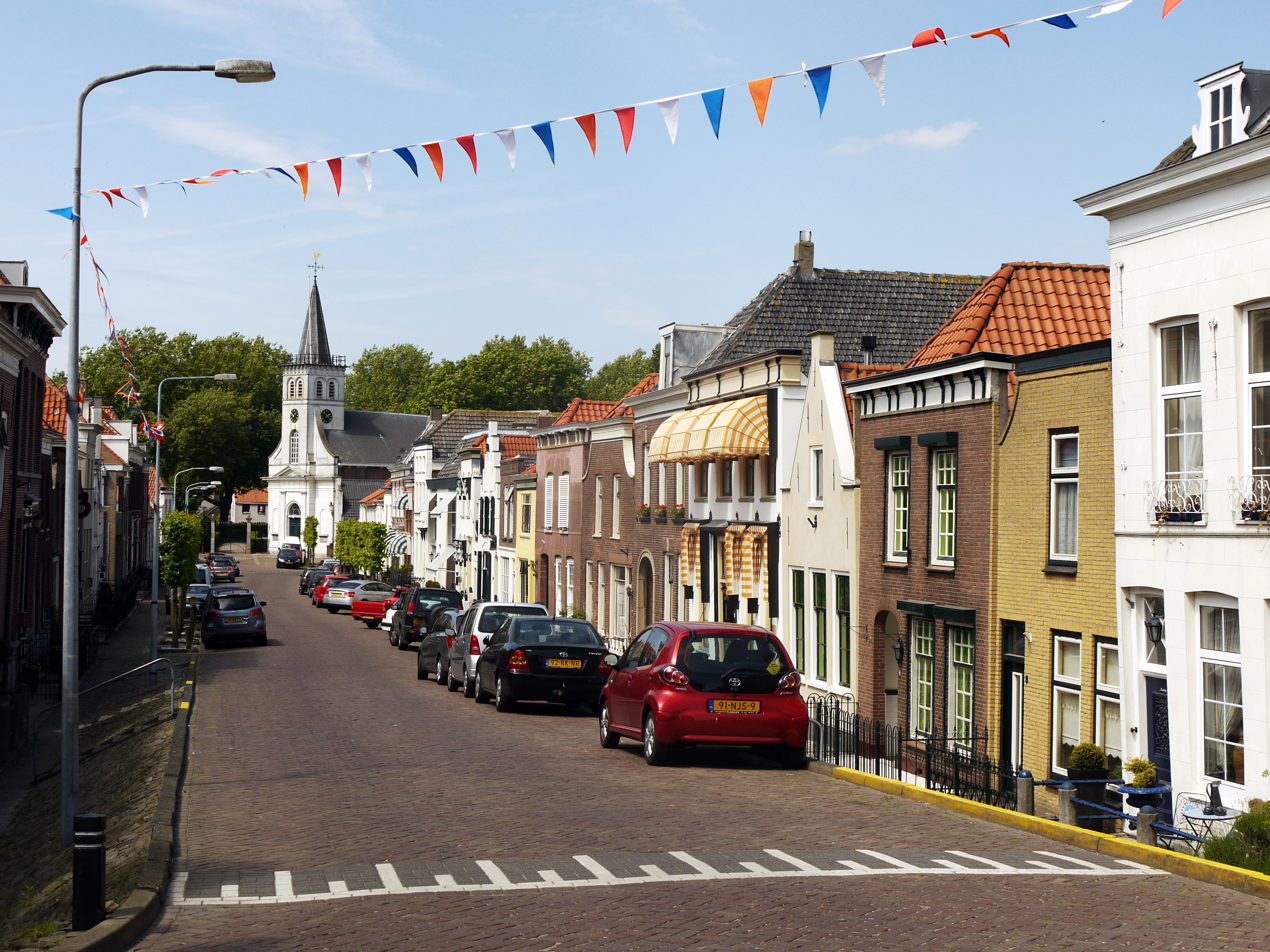
- Street view

- Coat of arms

- Location in the province of South Holland in the Netherlands Location in the Netherlands
- Coordinates: 51.6825096°N 4.3453989°E
- Country: Netherlands
- Province: South Holland
- Municipality: Goeree-Overflakkee

Area
  - Total: 23.42 km^{2} (9.04 sq mi)
- Elevation: 0.9 m (3.0 ft)

Population (2021)
  - Total: 2,660
  - Density: 114/km^{2} (294/sq mi)
- Time zone: UTC+1 (CET)
  - Summer (DST): UTC+2 (CEST)
- Postal code: 3257
- Dialing code: 0187

Ooltgensplaat is a village in the Dutch province of South Holland. It is a part of the municipality of Goeree-Overflakkee, and lies about 17 km south of Spijkenisse.

== History ==
The village was first mentioned in 1554 as Oitkensplate, and means "shoal of Oltken (person)". Ooltgensplaat developed after the Het Oudeland polder was created between 1481 and 1483. The village has a harbour canal to the Volkerak. Ooltgensplaats became strategically important during the Eighty Years' War because it controlled the access to the Volkerak.

The Dutch Reformed church is an aisleless L-shaped church which was built in 1847 as a replacement of the 16th century church. The former town hall is a building in mannerist style built between 1617 and 1618. It was restored between 1938 and 1939, and many of the alterations from 1839 were undone.

Fort Prins Hendrik was built as Fort Duquesne by the French. It is a square fortress surrounded by a moat with bastions on the corners. L-shaped barracks were added between 1880 and 1883. The fortress was decommissioned in 1928. In 1969, it was used as a holiday resort. The company went bankrupt in 2014, and in 2018, the fort and surrounding area was bought by the municipality.

Ooltgensplaat was home to 1,583 people in 1840. It was a separate municipality until 1966, when it became part of Oostflakkee. In 2013, it became part of the municipality of Goeree-Overflakkee.

== Gallery ==
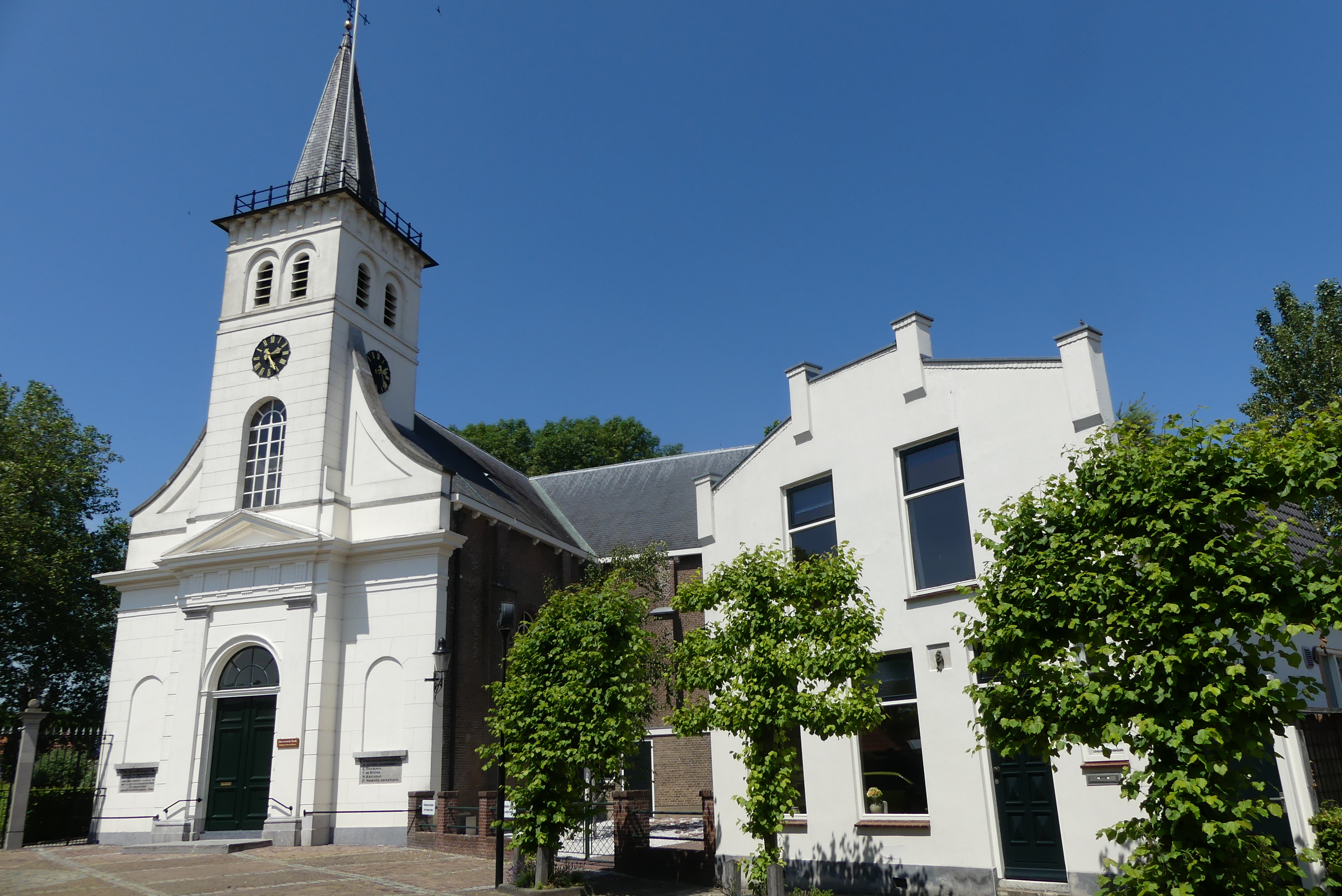
Dutch Reformed church

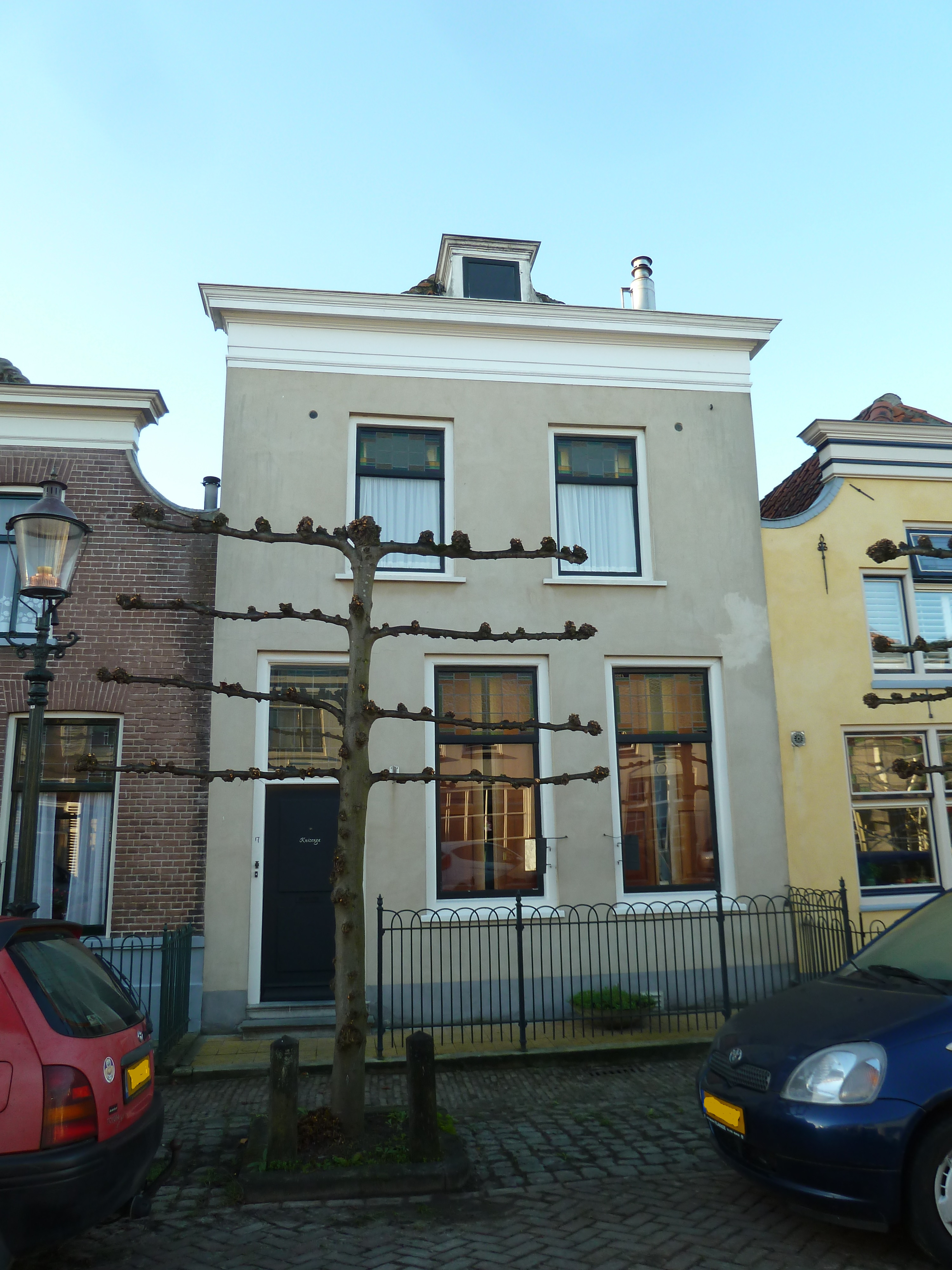
House in Oolgensplaat

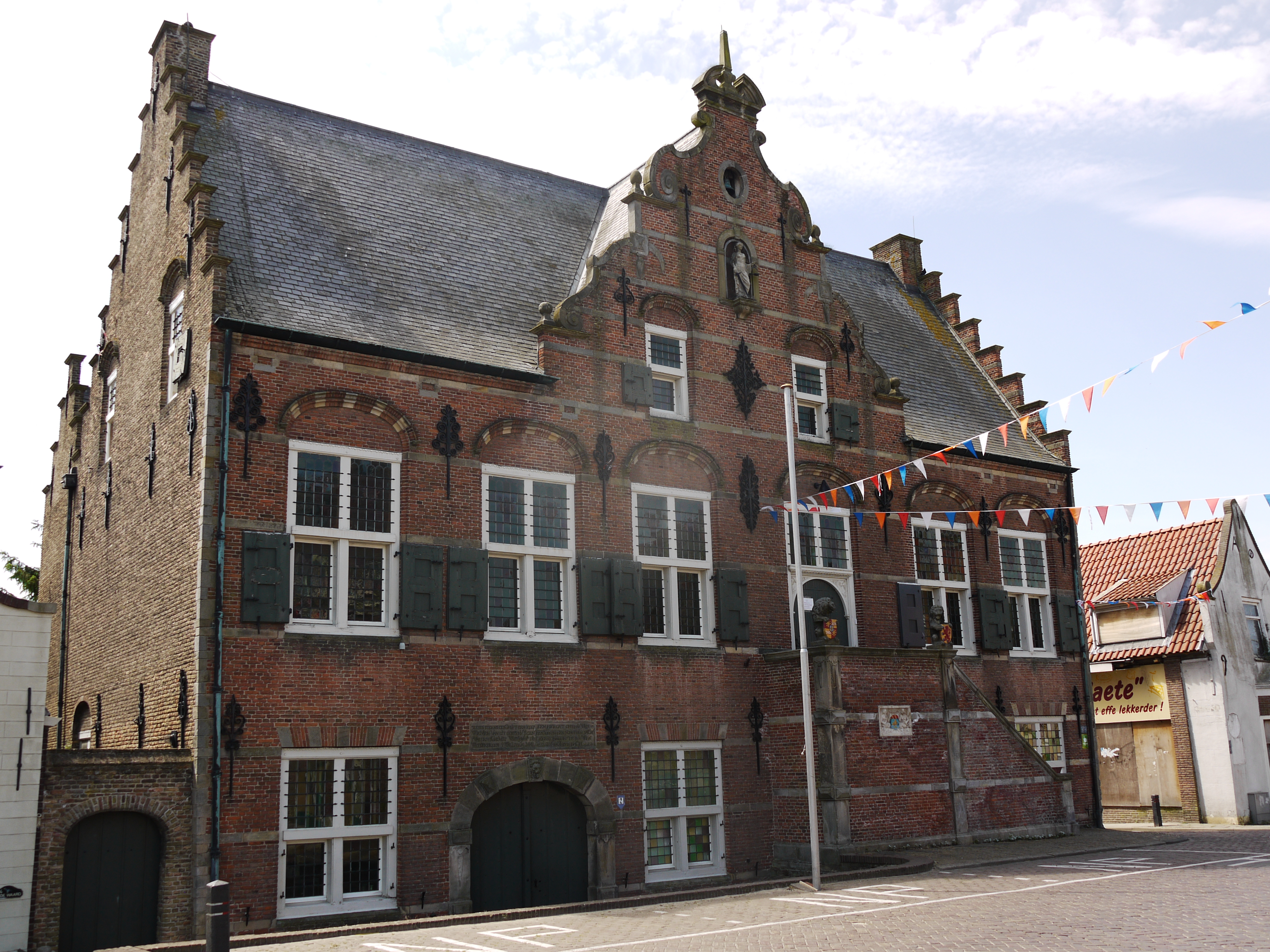
Former town hall

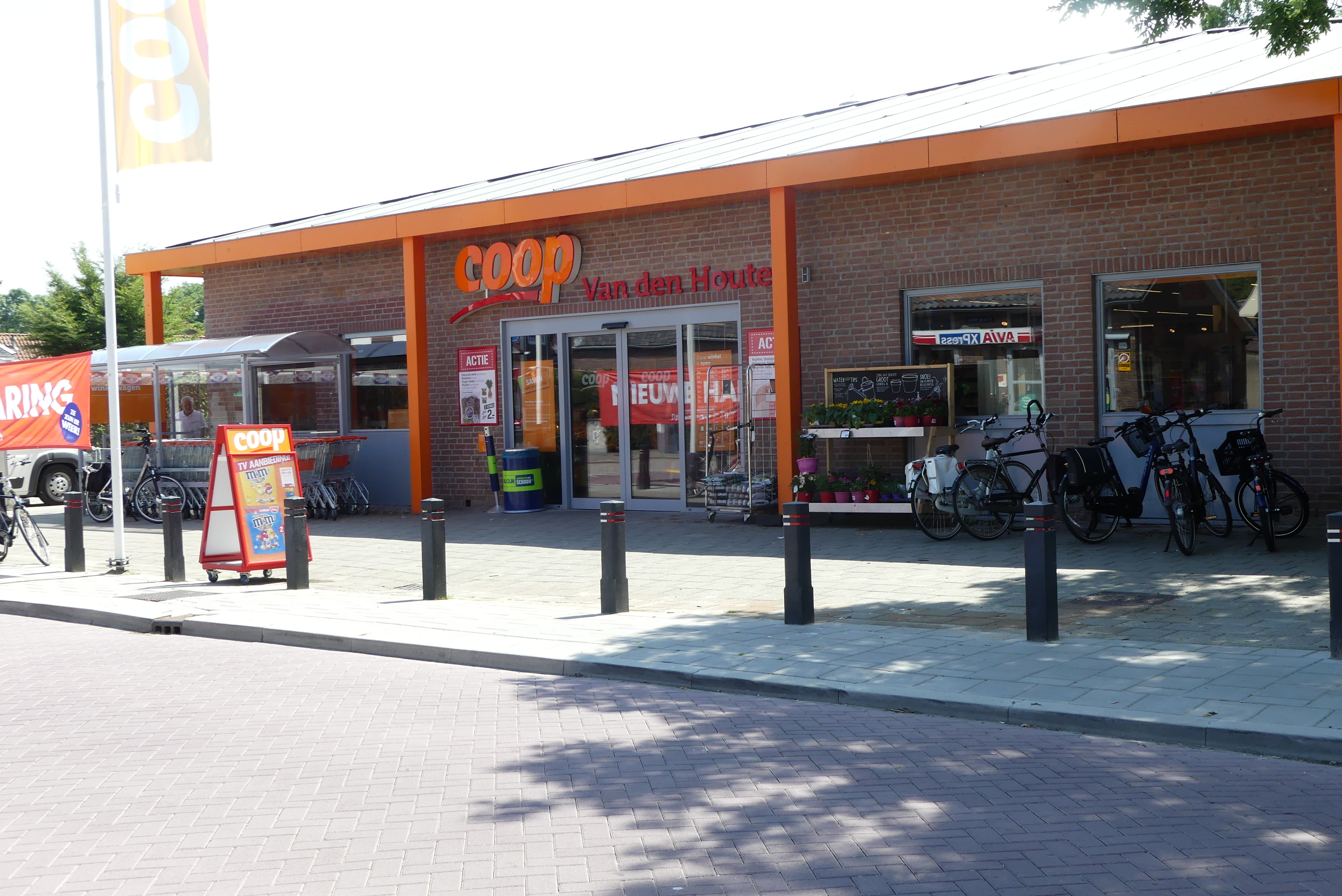
Supermarket
