= Kruisland =

- Village
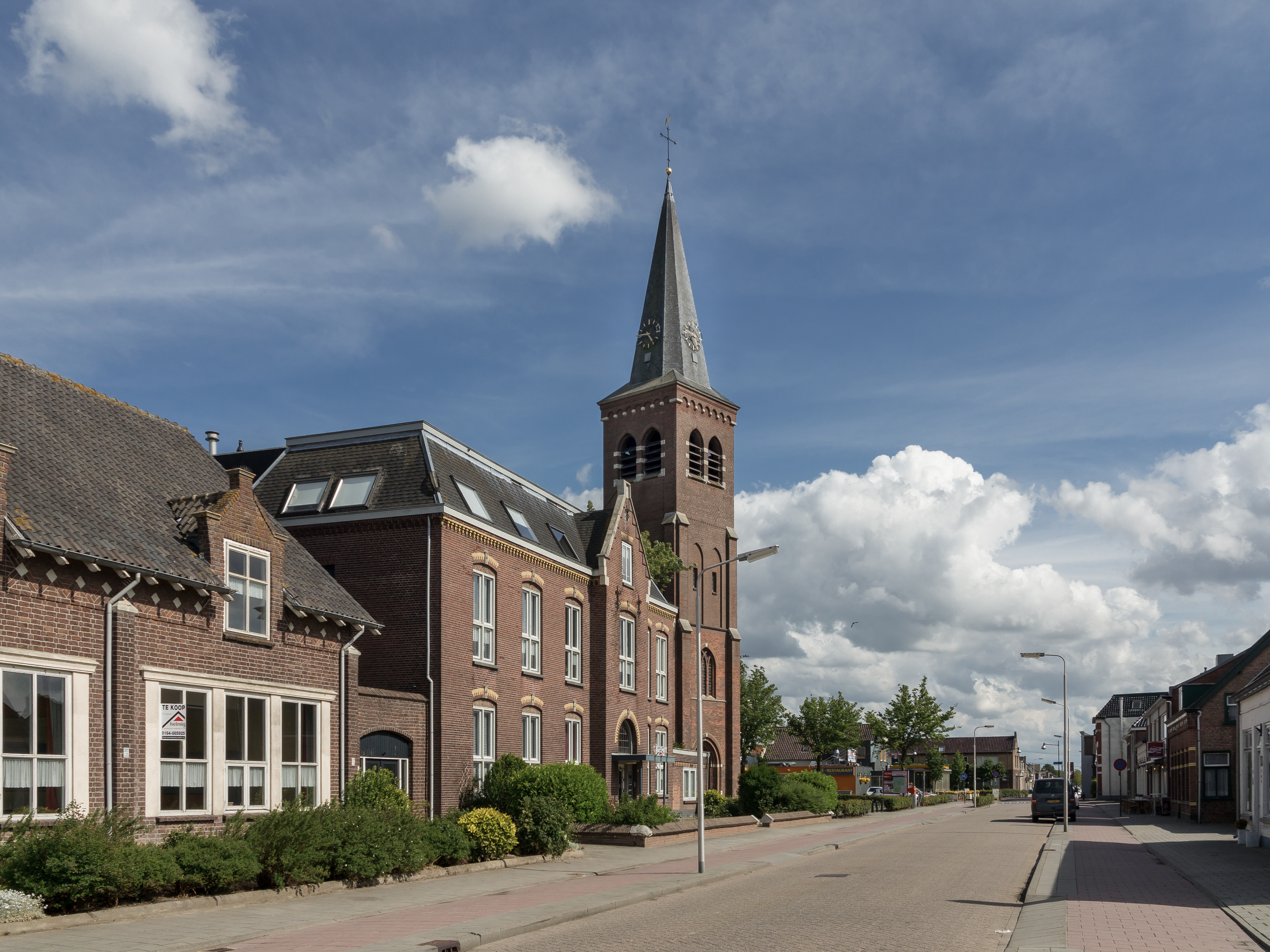
- The church in Kruisland

- Location in the province of North Brabant in the Netherlands Kruisland (Netherlands)
- Coordinates: 51°34′N 04°24′E
- Country: Netherlands
- Province: North Brabant
- Municipality: Steenbergen

Area
  - Total: 32.99 km^{2} (12.74 sq mi)
- Elevation: 0.3 m (0.98 ft)

Population (2021)
  - Total: 2,410
  - Density: 73.1/km^{2} (189/sq mi)
- Time zone: UTC+1 (CET)
  - Summer (DST): UTC+2 (CEST)
- Postal code: 4756
- Dialing code: 0167

Kruisland is a village in the municipality of Steenbergen in the province of North Brabant, in the Netherlands. It is located between Roosendaal and Steenbergen.

The village was first mentioned in 1501 as Cruyslande, and is named after the polder in which it is situation. The etymology is unknown. The village has been built landwards, because the city of Steenbergen wanted a harbour.

The Catholic St Georgius Church was built between 1885 and 1887 in Gothic Revival style and has a pentagon shaped choir. The church was blown up by the Germans in 1944, but was rebuilt in 1958.

Kruisland was home 250 people.

== Education ==
There is a Catholic primary school in Kruisland, RKBS De Zonneberg, which has approximately 200 students, most of whom come from the village.
