= Dinteloord =

- Village
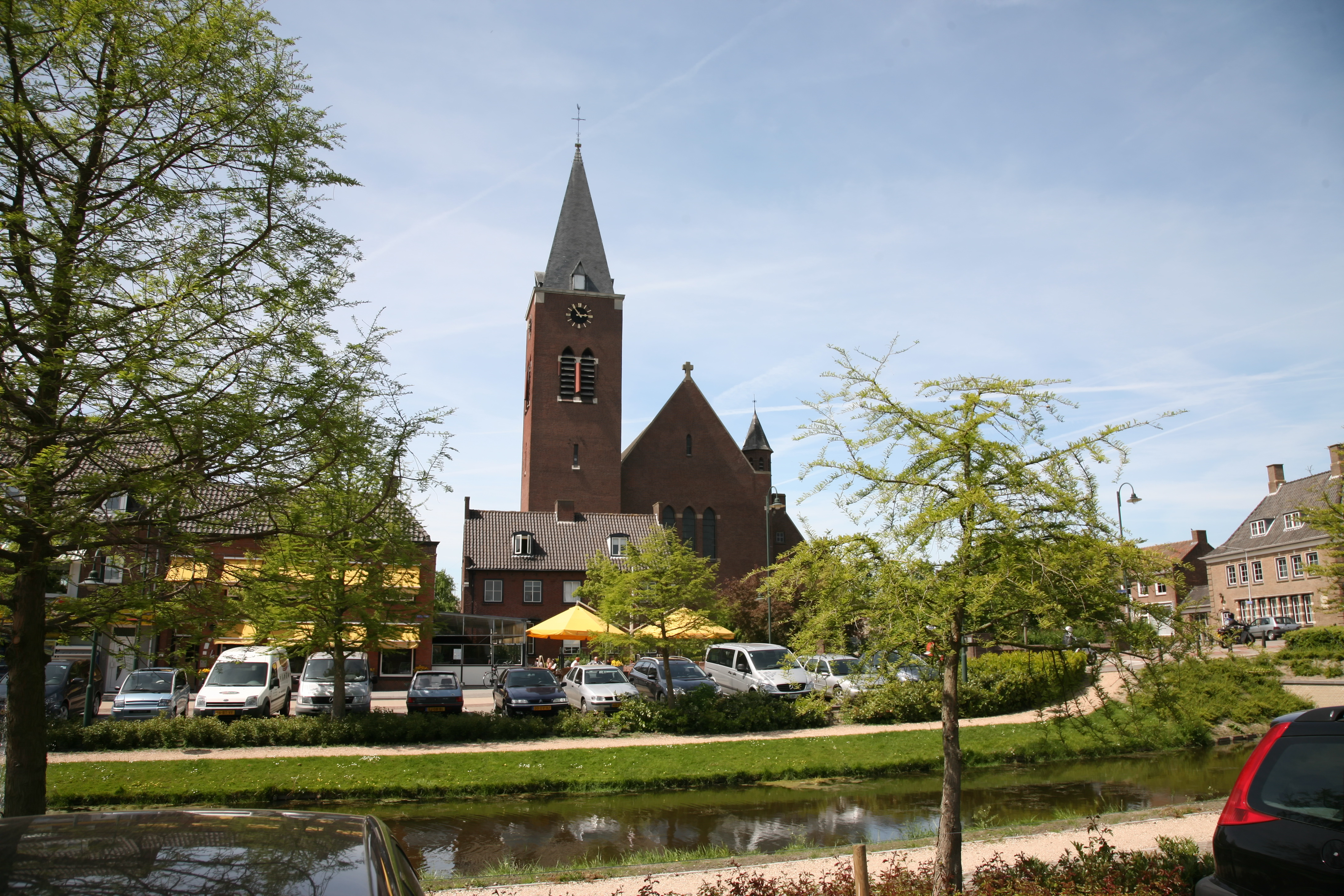
- Peter and Paul Church

- Flag Coat of arms

- Location in the province of North Brabant in the Netherlands Dinteloord (Netherlands)
- Coordinates: 51°38′6″N 4°22′9″E
- Country: Netherlands
- Province: North Brabant
- Municipality: Steenbergen

Area
  - Total: 49.89 km^{2} (19.26 sq mi)
- Elevation: 0.1 m (0.33 ft)

Population (2021)
  - Total: 5,735
  - Density: 115.0/km^{2} (297.7/sq mi)
- Time zone: UTC+1 (CET)
  - Summer (DST): UTC+2 (CEST)
- Postal code: 4671
- Dialing code: 0167

Dinteloord is a village in the Dutch province of North Brabant.

Dinteloord is known for its sugar factory, and the Muza festivals that have been held here for over 50 years.

== History ==
The village was first mentioned in 1604 as "le village de Dindeloort", and means land near the Dintel river. The village was founded after the Prinsenland polder was established.

The Dutch Reformed church was built in 1693 as a square building with an octagon domed tower. After 1944, only the walls remained, however it has been restored after the war. The town hall is a square building in neoclassic style which was constructed in 1830 by modifying the existing building. After being damaged in 1944, it was restored in 1948 and 1949. Dinteloord was home to 1,073 people in 1840.

The sugar factory of Suiker Unie (nowadays: Cosun Beet Company) was established in 1908, and is the largest sugar factory of Europe.

On 4 November 1944, a large part of the village was destroyed as a part of an allied bombing campaign.

Until 1997 Dinteloord together with Prinsenland formed an independent municipality). In 1998, it became part of the municipality of Steenbergen.

In 2005 the 400th jubilee was celebrated with a number of special festivities.

== Gallery ==
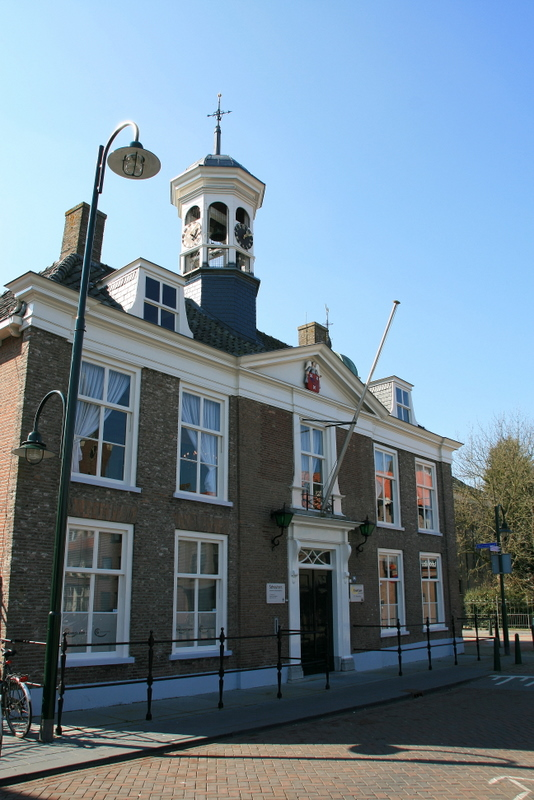
Town hall

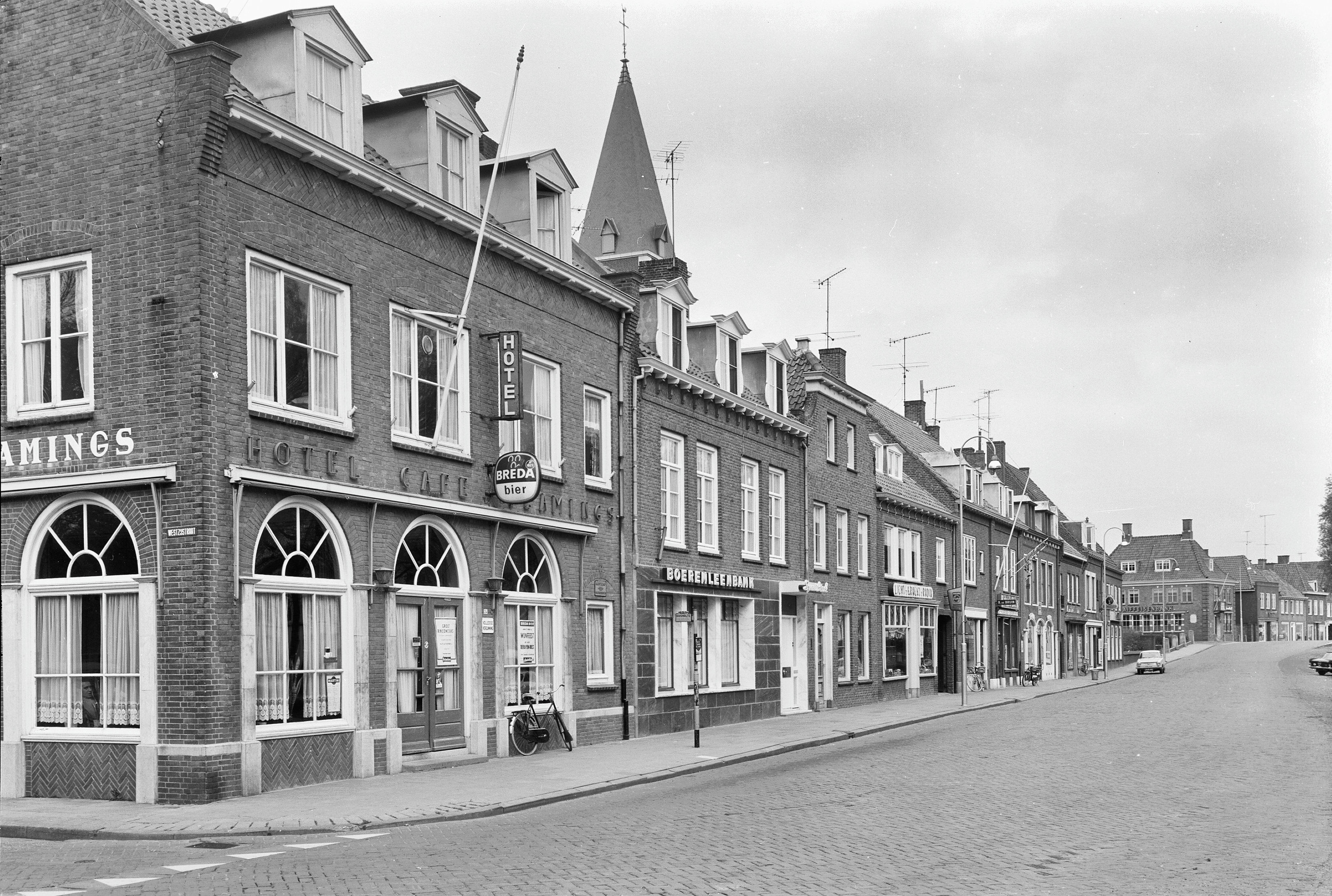
Street view (1966)

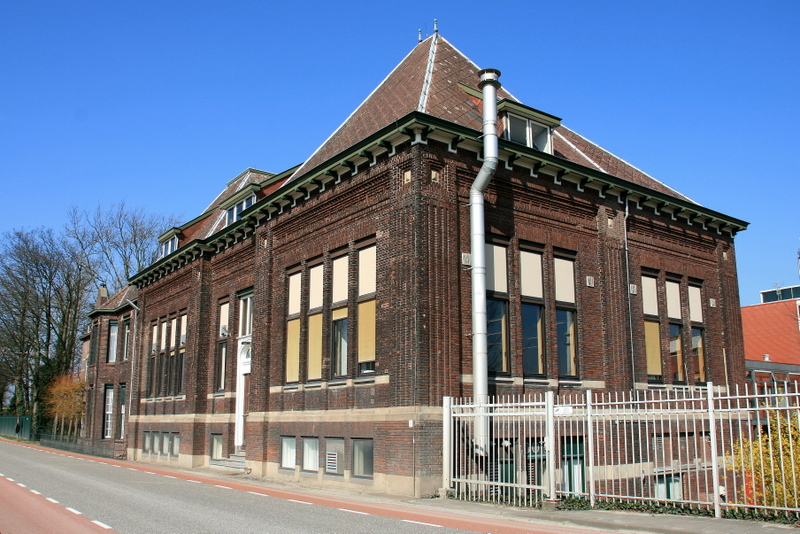
Sugar union office

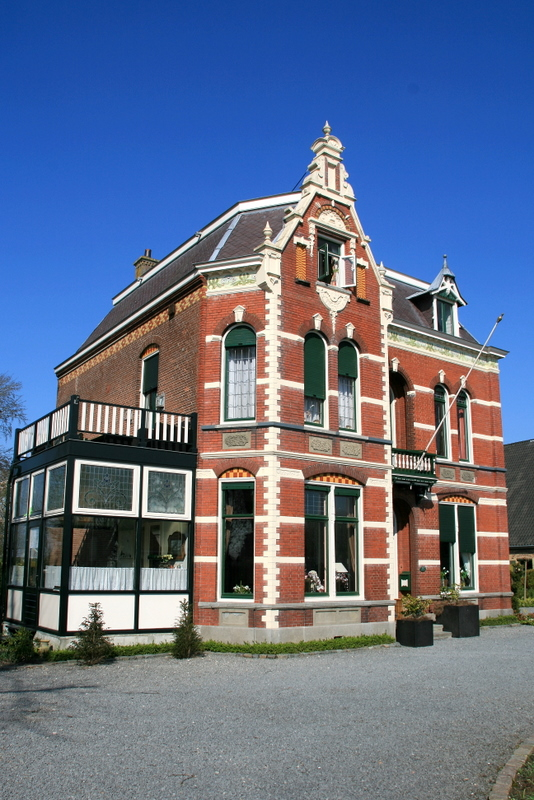
Villa in Dinteloord
