= Outline of land transport =

Overview of and topical guide to land transport

The following outline is provided as an overview of and topical guide to land transport:

Land transport – transport or movement of people, animals, and goods from one location to another on land, usually by railway or road, but also off-road.

== What type of thing is land transport? ==
Land transport can be described as all of the following:

- Technology – all forms of land transport, except walking and running, are types of technology.
  - Transport – movement of humans, animals and goods from one location to another.

== Types of land transport ==
Types of land transport

- Human-powered transport
  - Walking
  - Running
  - Cycling
  - Skateboarding
  - Human-powered aircraft
- Animal-powered transport
- Off-road transport
- Road transport
- Rail transport
- Other
  - Pipeline transport
  - Cable transport

== Functions of land transport ==
- Travel
- Public transport
- Freight transport

== History of land transport ==
History of land transport

- History of human-powered transport
  - History of cycling
  - History of running
  - History of skateboarding
  - History of human-powered aircraft
- History of animal-powered transport
- History of road transport
  - History of trucking
    - History of the trucking industry in the United States
- History of rail transport
- Other
  - History of pipeline transport
  - History of cable transport

== Elements of land transport ==
=== Land transport infrastructure ===
- Rail transport infrastructure
  - Railroad tracks
  - Railway electrification system
  - Railway signaling
  - Bridges
  - Tunnels
  - Train stations
- Road transport
  - Cycling infrastructure
  - Roads
  - Bridges
  - Tunnels
  - Street lights
  - Traffic lights
  - Traffic signs
- Other
  - Pipeline

=== Land transport operations ===
- Rail transport operations
  - Public transport timetable
- Road transport operations
  - Driving
    - Driver licensing
  - Motor vehicle registration
    - Vehicle registration certificate
      - Vehicle licence
    - Vehicle registration plate
  - Road traffic safety
    - Highway patrol
  - Trucking
    - Truck driver
  - Transportation planning
  - Road construction
  - Road maintenance
    - Roadworks

=== Land transport vehicles ===
- Rail vehicles – hook them together, and they make a train.
  - Locomotive
  - Railroad car
- Off-road vehicle
- Road vehicle
  - Bicycle
  - Car
  - Truck

== Land transport publications ==
- Journal of Transport and Land Use

== Persons influential in land transport ==
- Amzi L. Barber
- Henry Ford
- Cornelius Vanderbilt

== See also ==
- Outline of transport
