= Outline of transport =

Overview of and topical guide to transport

The following outline provides an overview of and topical guide to transport:

Transport or transportation – movement of people and goods from one place to another.

== Essence of transport ==
- Driving involves controlling a vehicle, usually a motor vehicle such as a truck, bus, or automobile. For motorcycles, bicycles and animals, it is called riding.
- Shipping, transporting of goods and cargo, by land, sea, and air
- Travel, movement of people, by land, sea, and air

== Types of transport, by availability ==
- Private transport
- Public transport (public transit)

== Types of transport, by mode and vehicles ==
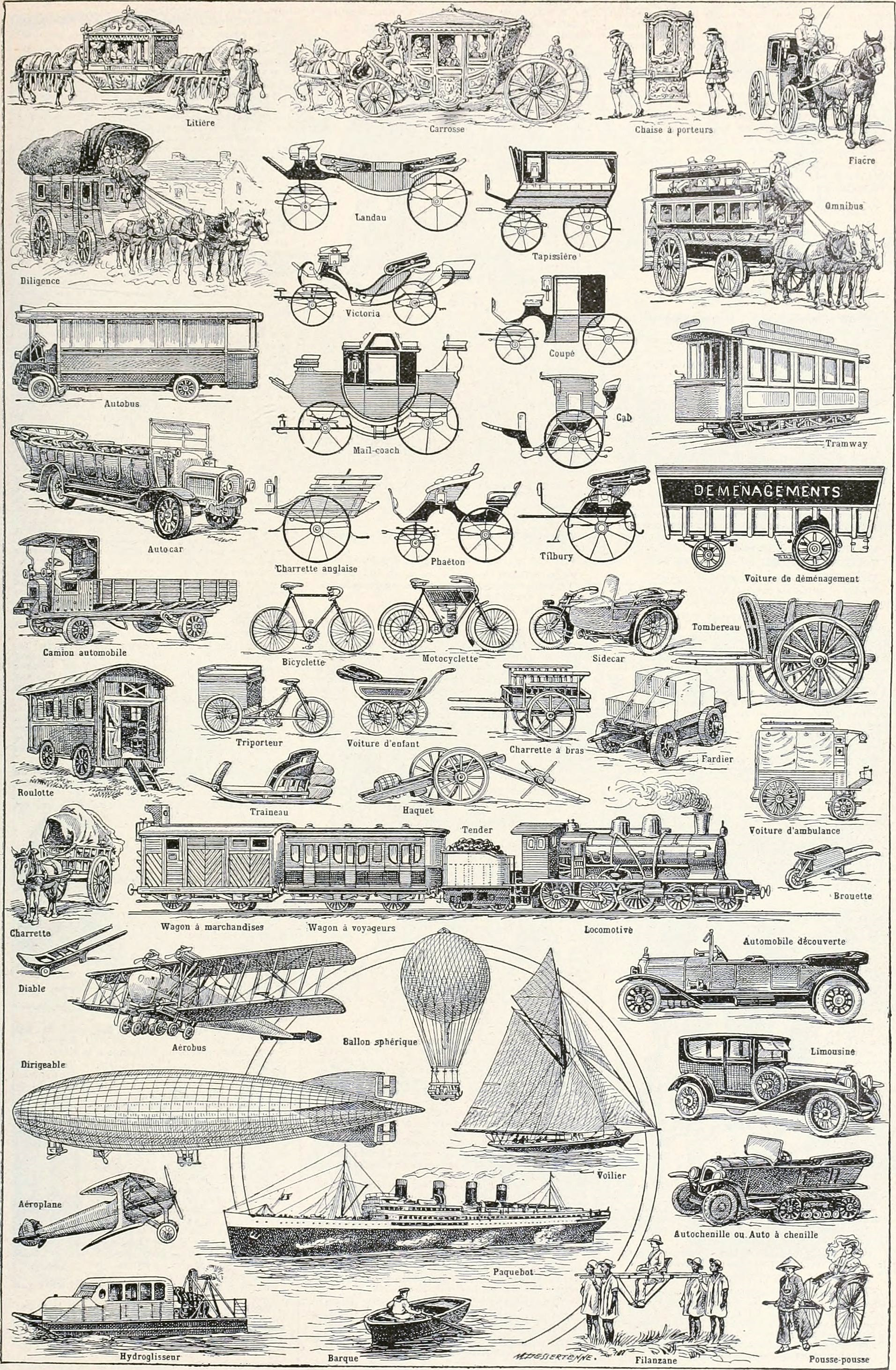

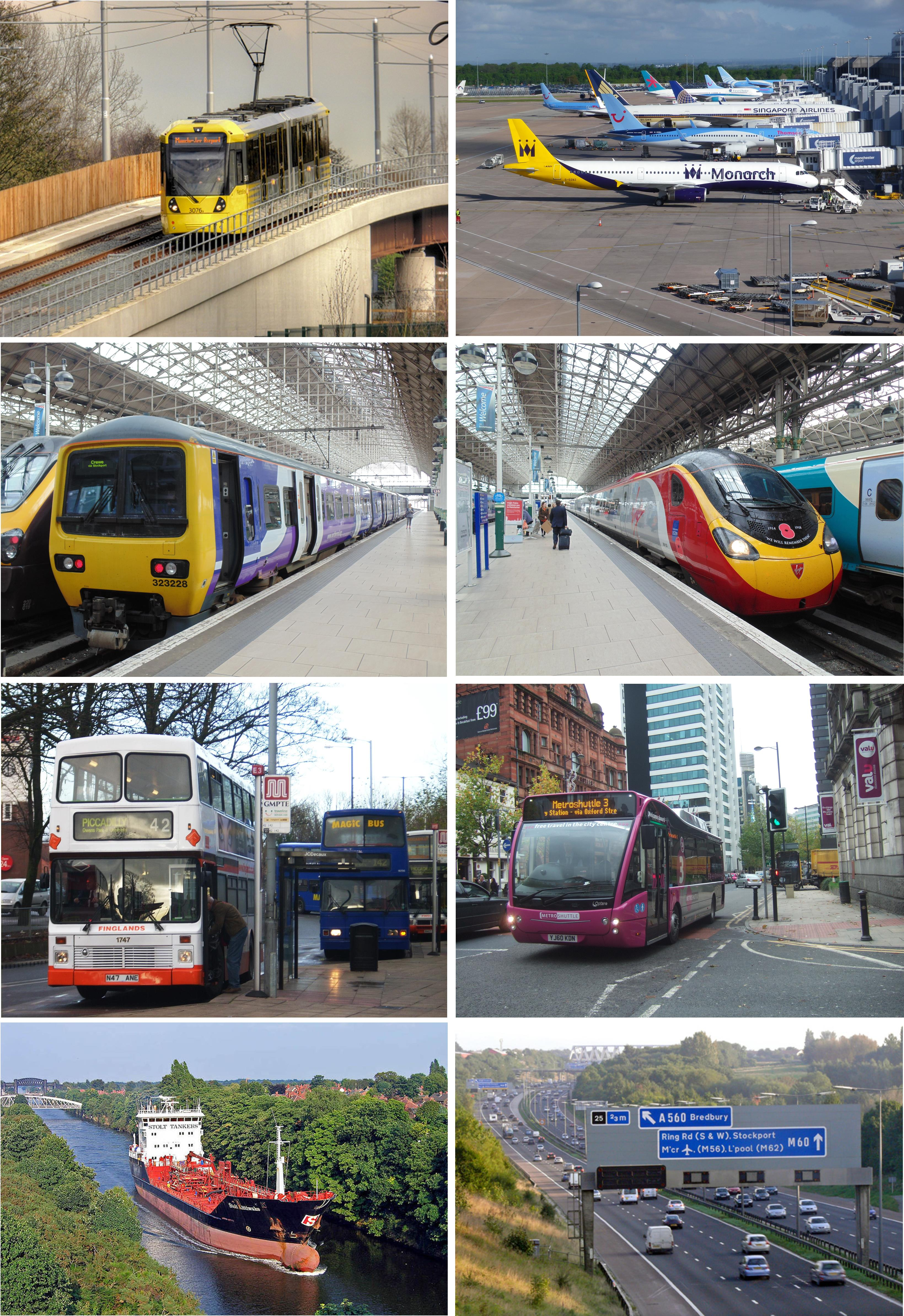

- Intermodal passenger transport

=== Aviation ===
Aviation

- Fixed-wing aircraft
- Airship (dirigible)
- Autogyro
- Balloon
- Blimp
- Helicopter
- Human-powered aircraft
- Parachute (downward air transport only)
- Rocket
- Projectile (goods only, normally explosives) / Human cannonball
- Supersonic transport
- Zeppelin

=== Animal-powered transport ===
Animal-powered transport

==== Animals domesticated for transport ====
- camel, Arabian, and Bactrian
- carabao
- deer
- dog
  - sled dog
  - Dogcart (dog-drawn)
- elephant
- equine
  - donkey
  - hinny
  - horse
    - riding horse
    - packhorse
    - driving horse
    - draft horse
  - mule
- llama
- moose
- ostrich
- ox
- reindeer
- sheep
- yak
- Turtles were used for riding as a sport in early 20th-century Australia
- Dolphins (to carry markers to attach to detected mines)
- Pigeon (for carrying messages)

==== Animal-powered vehicles ====
- barge (sometimes pulled by humans)
- berlin (vehicle)
- Brougham (carriage)
- carriage
- cart
- chaise
- charabanc
- chariot (ancient form sometimes used in combat, later a racing machine, later a name for something entirely different in carriages)
- coach
- Conestoga wagon
- curricle
- dogcart
- drag
- dray
- ferry
- float
- gig
- governess cart
- Hansom cab
- horsecar
- horse-drawn boat
- horse-powered boat
- Experiment (horse-powered boat)
- howdah
- litter (vehicle) (sometimes carried by humans, mainly used with equines, though occasionally camels)
- mail coach
- Michigan logging wheels
- omnibus
- bullock cart
- pantechnicon van
- phaeton (carriage)
- postchaise
- pulka
- railway
- rockaway (carriage)
- sled
- sledge
- sleigh
- stagecoach
- streetcar
- sulky
- tangah
- team boat
- telega
- towboat
- travois
- trolley
- van
- vardo
- Victoria (carriage)
- vis-a-vis (carriage)
- wagon
- wain

=== Cable transport ===
Cable transport

- Aerial tramway
- Cable car (railway)
- Chairlift
  - Detachable chairlift
- Elevator
- Funicular (inclined plane)
- Gondola lift
- List of aerial lift manufacturers
- Paternoster lift
- chain ferry

=== Conveyor transport ===
Conveyor transport

- Conveyor belt
- Escalator
- Moving walkway (moving sidewalk, travelator, and the inclined moving sidewalk, a moving ramp)

=== Convoy ===
Convoy

- caravan
  - Camel train

=== Human-powered transport ===
Human-powered transport

- Human-powered land vehicles
  - Pedal-powered vehicles
    - Bicycle (outline)
    - Bicycle trailer
    - BMX bike
    - Boneshaker
    - City bicycle
    - Cold-weather biking
    - Cruiser bicycle
    - Cycle rickshaw
    - Cyclo-cross bicycle
    - Fatbike
    - Flat bar road bike
    - Folding bicycle
    - Freight bicycle
    - Hybrid bicycle
    - Mountain bike
    - Party bike
    - Pedelec
    - Penny-farthing
    - Porteur bicycle
    - Prone bicycle
    - Quadracycle
    - Recumbent bicycle
    - Road bicycle
    - Roadster
    - Safety bicycle
    - Small wheel bicycle
    - Tandem bicycle
    - Touring bicycle
    - Trailer bike
    - Tricycle
    - Unicycle
    - Utility bicycle
    - Velocar
    - Velocipede
    - Velomobile
  - Treadle-powered vehicles
    - Treadle bicycle
  - Hand-powered vehicles
    - Handcar
    - Handcycle
    - Hobcart
    - Wheelchair
  - Row action-powered vehicles
    - Rowing cycle
  - Foot-powered vehicles
    - Balance bicycle
    - Dandy horse
    - Kick scooter
    - Inline skating
          - skates
    - Roller skating
          - skates
    - Walking
  - Board-based vehicles
    - Brakeboard
    - Caster board
    - Freeboard
    - Freeline skates
    - Longboard
    - Skateboard
    - Snakeboard
    - Street luge
  - Pushed or pulled vehicles
    - Baby transport
    - Baggage cart
    - Cart
    - Hand truck
    - Pulled rickshaw
    - Shopping cart
    - Stairclimber
    - Stretcher
    - Wheelbarrow
  - Carried vehicles
    - Litter/sedan chair
    - Scoop stretcher
  - Weight-shifting vehicles
    - Trikke
- Human-powered watercraft
  - Canoe
  - Hydrocycle
  - Hydrofoil
  - Kayak
  - Paddleboarding
  - Pedalo
  - Rowing
- Human-powered amphibious vehicles
  - Amphibious cycle
- Human-powered snow and ice vehicles
  - Alpine touring skis
  - Cold-weather biking
  - Crampons
  - Cross-country skis
  - Fatbiking (biking in snow with bikes with wide tires)
  - Ice skates
  - Kicksled
  - Sled
  - Snowboard
  - Snowshoes
  - Telemark skis
- Aircraft (list)
  - Helicopter
  - Ornithopter

=== Hybrid transport ===
- Amphibious vehicle
- Hybrid vehicle
- Moped
- Motorized bicycle

=== Military transport ===
==== Air force transport ====
- Military aircraft

==== Army transport ====
- Armoured fighting vehicle
- Armoured personnel carrier
- Jeep
- Landing craft
- Limbers and caissons (military)
- Mega Tank
- Mini-Tank
- German Panzer

==== Navy transport ====
- Aircraft carrier
  - Escort carrier
- Naval ship
- PT boat
- Submarine
  - U-boat
- Torpedo boat
  - Naval Tank ship

=== Ground transportation ===
Ground transportation

==== Motorized road transport ====
Road transport

- Automobile (car)
  - Car body styles
- Auto rickshaw
- Bus
  - Midibus
  - Minibus
  - School bus
  - Trolleybus
- Minivan
- Motorcycle
- Share taxi
- Truck
  - Trucking industry in the United States
- Unimog
- Van
  - Campervan
  - Trailer
    - Caravan
- Sports car

==== Motorized off-road transport ====
Off-road transport

- All-terrain vehicle
- Engineering vehicle
- Hovercraft
- Ice boat
- Snowmobile
- Sport utility vehicle
- Tank
- Traction engine
- Tractor

==== Rail transport ====
Rail transport

- Accessibility
- Glossary of rail terminology
- High-speed rail
- Locomotive
- Maglev (transport)
- Monorail
- Mountain railway
  - Cable car (railway)
  - Funicular
  - Rack railway (cog railway)
- Multiple unit
  - Diesel multiple unit
  - Electric multiple unit (EMU)
- People mover
- Personal rapid transit
- Rail tracks
- Rail transport by country
  - History of rail transport by country
- Rapid transit (metro, underground, subway); see also List of rapid transit systems
- Train
- Tram, light rail (streetcar, trolley); see also List of tram and light-rail transit systems

=== Pipeline transport ===
Pipeline transport

- Natural gas
- Petroleum
- Pneumatic tube
- Sanitary sewer
- Slurry
- Water

=== Ship transport ===
Ship transport

- Barge
- Boat
  - Jet ski
  - Jetboat
  - Lifeboat (rescue)
  - Lifeboat (shipboard)
  - Narrowboat
  - Punt (boat)
  - Wherry
- Ferry
  - Cable ferry
- Horse-drawn boat
- Hydrofoil
- Sailing
- Ship
- Tank ship
- Yacht

=== Space transport ===
Space transport

- Interplanetary spaceflight
- Rocket
- Space Shuttle
- Space station
- Spacecraft
  - Spacecraft propulsion

==== Transport on the Moon and Mars ====
- Lunar rover (various, crewed and robotic, Moon, 1971–1973)
- Lunokhod programme
- Nomad rover (robotic test vehicle, has not been in space, 1997)
- Opportunity rover (MER-B – robotic, Mars, 2004)
- Sojourner (robotic, Mars, 1997)
- Spirit rover (MER-Arobotic, Mars, 2004)

==== Space transport launched from the surface of the Moon ====
- Ascent stage of Apollo Lunar Module, crewed, six times, 1969-1972 (return to Earth in the Apollo program)

=== Transmission ===
Transmission

- Power transmission
  - Electric power transmission
- Telecommunication
  - Transmission (telecommunications)

== Transportation systems ==
=== Networks ===
- Airlines
- Bridges
- Canals
- Foreshoreways
- Freeways
- Greenways
- Highways
- Motorways
- Personal rapid transit
- Pipeline transport
- Railroads (also called railways)
- Rivers
- Roads
  - List of roads and highways
- Cycling infrastructure
- Sidewalks
- Skyways
- Stairways, ladders
- Tunnels

=== Nodes ===
- Transport hub
- Airport, Heliport, List of airports
- Air traffic control
- Bus stop (including bus station, bus depot) and tram stop
- Harbor, Port
- Metro station
  - Cross-platform interchange
  - List of London Underground stations
  - Architecture of the Paris Metro
- Junction (road), Parking
- Spaceport
- Train station
  - Railway platform

=== Subsystems ===
- Air safety
- Containerization
- Continuous track
- Engine
- Foot
- Wheel

== History of transport ==
- Aviation history
- Domestication of the horse
- Horse-drawn vehicle
- Horse transports in the Middle Ages
- History of the bicycle
- History of rail transport
- History of rapid transit
- History of the automobile
- List of transport museums
- Maritime history

== Theory and design ==
- Engineering
  - Civil engineering
  - Highway engineering
  - Traffic engineering (transportation)
  - Transport engineering
- Fuel efficiency in transportation
- Intelligent transportation system
- Infrastructure
- Locomotion - self-powered motion of a human, non-human animal or vehicle
- Logistics
- Navigation
- Queueing theory
- Resource management
- Sustainable transport
- Tourism
  - Ecotourism
- Traffic congestion
- Traffic psychology
- Transport economics
- Transport finance
- Transport Logistic (trade show)
- Transportation forecasting
- Transportation planning
- Travel
  - Travel behavior
  - Travel class
- Urban economics
- Urban planning

=== Fictional and proposed future transport ===
- Broomstick
- Flying car (disambiguation)
- Flying sled (see Santa Claus)
- Interstellar travel
- Launch loop
- Magic carpet
- Moller Skycar M400
- Starship
- Teleportation
- Transporter (Star Trek)

== Transport by region ==
- United States Department of Transportation
- Worldwide transportation infrastructure

== Transport lists ==
Transportation:

Aviation articles:

Aircraft • Manufacturers • Engines • Engine manufacturers • Weapons • By date and usage

Aviation accidents and incidents: By airline • By location • By year

Airports: Busiest • Africa • Asia • Europe • North America • Oceania • South America

History:

Transport museums

Land transport:

Automobiles: Manufacturers • Truck types • Convoy codes

Cycles: Bicycle parts • Bicycle types • Motorcycle manufacturers

Rail transport: Heritage railways • Tram and light-rail transit systems • Melbourne tram routes • Metro systems (subways) • London Underground stations • Closed London Underground stations • Melbourne railway stations • Closed Melbourne railway stations • Named passenger trains • UK railway stations

Road systems:
Roads and highways: Highways in Australia • UK motorways • Interstate Highways in the U.S. • U.S. Numbered Highways • State highways in the U.S.

Bridges: UK • US • Longest suspension bridge spans
Tunnels: NL • NZ • UK

Maritime: Ships • Fictional ships • Sailing boat types • Marinas

Space transport: Spacecraft

== See also ==
- Index of environmental articles
- Outline of vehicles
- Journal of Transport and Land Use
- List of emerging technologies
- Taxicabs by country
- Outline of public transport
- Public transport
