= List of tunnels in the Netherlands =

The following is a list of tunnels in the Netherlands, including tunnels intended for motor vehicles, freight and passenger trains, light rail, and the Netherlands' Metro systems. There are also numerous pedestrian tunnels connected to the stations.

== Road tunnels ==
- Arenatunnel, Amsterdam
- Beneluxtunnel
- Botlektunnel
- Coentunnel and Second Coen Tunnel, Amsterdam
- Corbulotunnel (in N434, south of Leiden)
- Drechttunnel, Dordrecht
- Heinenoordtunnel
- Hubertustunnel, The Hague
- IJtunnel, Amsterdam
- Ketheltunnel, Schiedam
- Kiltunnel, Dordrecht
- Koningstunnel, The Hague
- Maasboulevaardtunnel, Maastricht
- Maastunnel, Rotterdam
- Noordtunnel
- Piet Hein Tunnel, Amsterdam
- Roertunnel, Roermond
- Schipholtunnel, A4 motorway near Amsterdam Airport
- Sijtwendetunnel, Leidschendam-Voorburg, see also N14 expressway
- Swalmentunnel
- Stationsplein, Leiden
- Stationstunnel, Venlo
- Thomassentunnel
- Velsertunnel
- Vlaketunnel
- Western Scheldt Tunnel (Dutch: Westerscheldetunnel)
- Wijkertunnel
- Zeeburgertunnel

== Railroad tunnels ==
- Botlek Rail Tunnel, Rotterdam
- Hemtunnel, Amsterdam under North Sea Canal
- HSL-Zuid Tunnel Groene Hart
- railroad tunnels at Best, Rijswijk
- Sophiaspoortunnel, part of Betuweroute
- Schipholtunnel (railroad near Amsterdam Airport)
- Velsertunnel under the North Sea Canal
- Willemstunnel under Nieuwe Maas

== Metro tunnels ==
- northeast side of the Amsterdam metro system
- central part of the Rotterdam metro system
- metro tunnel under the Nieuwe Maas waterway
- metro tunnel under the Nieuwe Waterweg waterway, along Beneluxtunnel

== Light-rail tunnels ==
- tram tunnel Grote Marktstraat (TTGM), The Hague

== Pedestrian tunnels ==
- Maastunnel, Rotterdam also has tubes for pedestrians and cyclists

== See also ==
- Train routes in the Netherlands
