= Roertunnel =

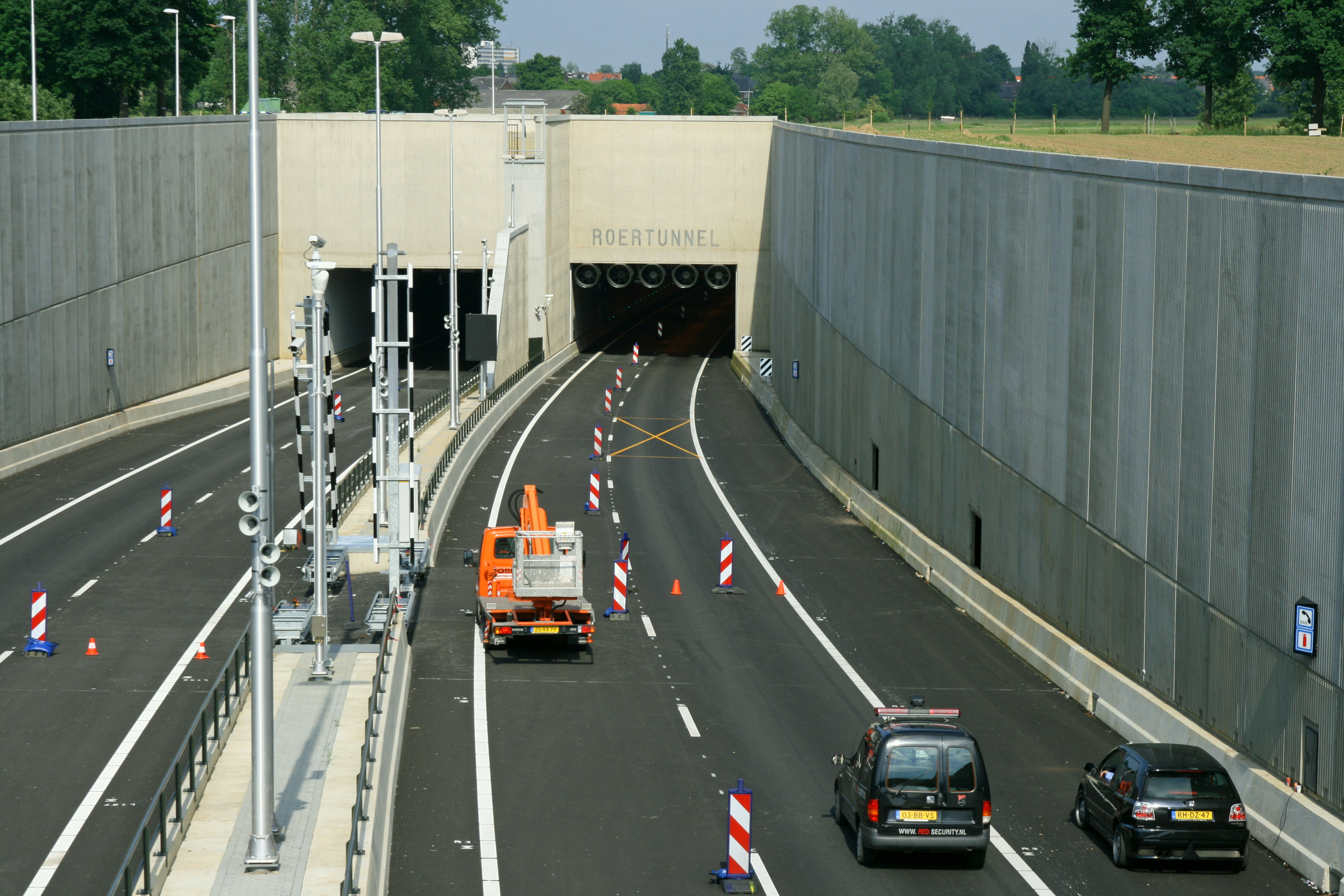

Overview
- Coordinates: 51°10′28″N 5°59′57″E
- Route: A73

Operation
- Opened: February 18, 2008 one lane each way only. December 1, 2009 all lanes.
- Operator: Rijkswaterstaat

Technical
- Length: 2450m

The Roertunnel is a 2.45 km long land tunnel in Roermond, Netherlands. Opening in 2008, it is one of the longest land tunnels for road traffic in the Netherlands.

The tunnel is a part of the A73-south highway, connecting the A73-north in Venlo to the A2 near Echt. The tunnel consists of two main tubes, each containing two traffic lanes without shoulders. One tube contains northbound traffic, while the other contains southbound traffic. Additionally, there is a third tube between the two main tubes that functions as an emergency escape route. The maximum speed inside the tunnels is 100 km/h. Since the highway is directly in the path of urban and protected environmental areas in Roermond, the tunnel has been constructed to lead the traffic underneath East Roermond's urban area, the Roerdal environmental protected zone, and the Roer river.

A little north of the Roertunnel, a sister tunnel, The Swalmentunnel, has been constructed according to the same construction principles. That tunnel measures 400m in length and leads underneath the urban area of Swalmen, a village in the municipality of Roermond.

Once the tunnel is fully opened, one of the entry ramps in Roermond will have to be redesigned, because according to safety regulations the final entry on the highway must be 300m ahead of the tube of a tunnel, and the entry to the southbound tube in the Roertunnel ends only a few meters ahead of the tunnel. The plan is to redirect all highway traffic to the left lane before entering the tunnel, so that all traffic on the entry ramp can use the right lane for the complete length of the tunnel before merging with the rest of the traffic upon exit of the tunnel.

== Construction Difficulties ==
The estimated opening on 1 January 2008 was delayed as the involved parties constructing the tunnel underestimated the technical challenge. A mere 50 security systems had been installed in the tunnel. The tunnel opened partially (weekdays only) in February 2008 with only 1 carriageway per direction opened and a speed limit of 70 km/h. However on 18 February 2008, the first day of operation, long traffic-jams were caused by technical problems in the tunnels and in the 10 days after opening, 11 closures had occurred in both tunnels causing many traffic problems. Rijkswaterstaat had to postpone the final opening and construction of the tunnel due to the many malfunctions and closures of the tunnel. Today, the tunnels are still only partially opened awaiting the final test phase for final opening. This final stage will cause a 9 week closure of the tunnel for extensive testing of all safety measures. The closure was scheduled to take place on 5 January 2009 but has been postponed.
