= Corbulotunnel =

Road tunnel in the Netherlands

Coordinates: 52°08′08″N 4°27′35″E

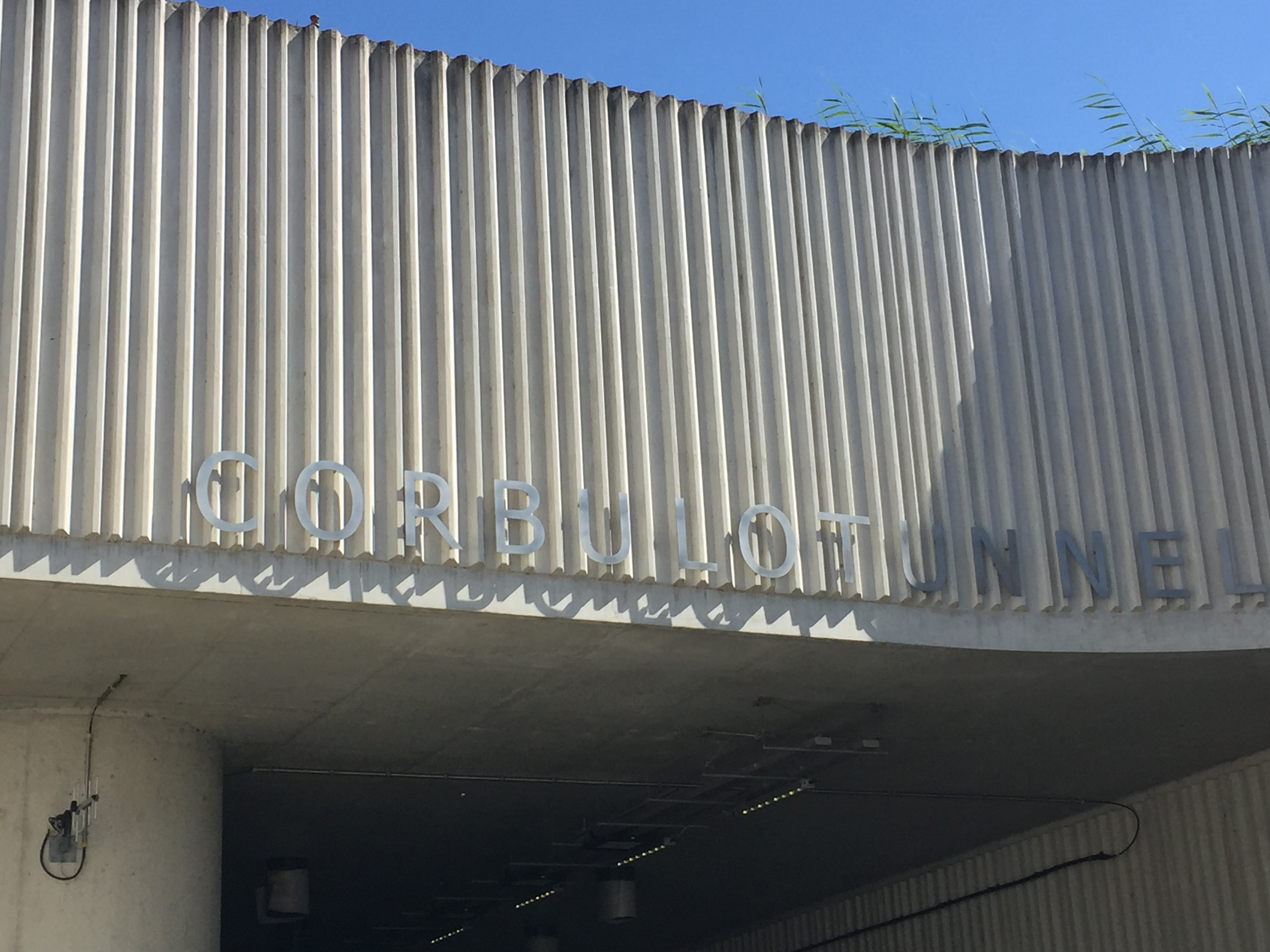
- Interactive map of Corbulotunnel

Overview
- Location: Leiden, Netherlands
- Status: Open

Operation
- Opened: 5 July 2024
- Owner: Province of South Holland
- Operator: Rijkswaterstaat
- Traffic: Automotive

Technical
- Length: 2.5 km

The Corbulotunnel is a road tunnel in the Netherlands, located near Leiden. It forms part of the N434 provincial road, connecting the A4 and A44 motorways. The tunnel opened to traffic on 5 July 2024 after several years of construction and delays. It is approximately 2.5 kilometres long and is intended to improve regional connectivity and reduce traffic congestion in and around Leiden.

The tunnel is part of the RijnlandRoute, a major infrastructure project designed to improve traffic flow in the Holland Rijnland region, particularly around Leiden and Katwijk. The N434, which includes the tunnel and a section of sunken roadway, is expected to handle around 9 million vehicles annually and aims to enhance accessibility and livability in the region.

The project was approved in 2014, with construction beginning in 2017. The work involved around eighty specialists from nineteen countries, including divers and tunnel experts. The tunnel consists of two tubes, each approximately 2,250 metres long and carrying two lanes of traffic. The deepest point lies more than 30 metres below sea level. Construction was carried out using a specially designed tunnel boring machine.

The Corbulotunnel was built between 2017 and 2024 by a contractor consortium on behalf of the province of South Holland. The tunnel and the adjacent sunken road were designed to minimize impact on the surrounding environment. The tunnel boring machine used for construction had a diameter of nearly 11 metres and simultaneously excavated soil and installed prefabricated concrete segments to form the tunnel structure.

The total cost of the project was approximately €1 billion. The tunnel was named after the Roman general Corbulo, who ordered the construction of a canal connecting the Rhine and the Meuse in the same region in ancient times.

Kunstwerk 17 was named Corbulotunnel.

== Construction issues ==
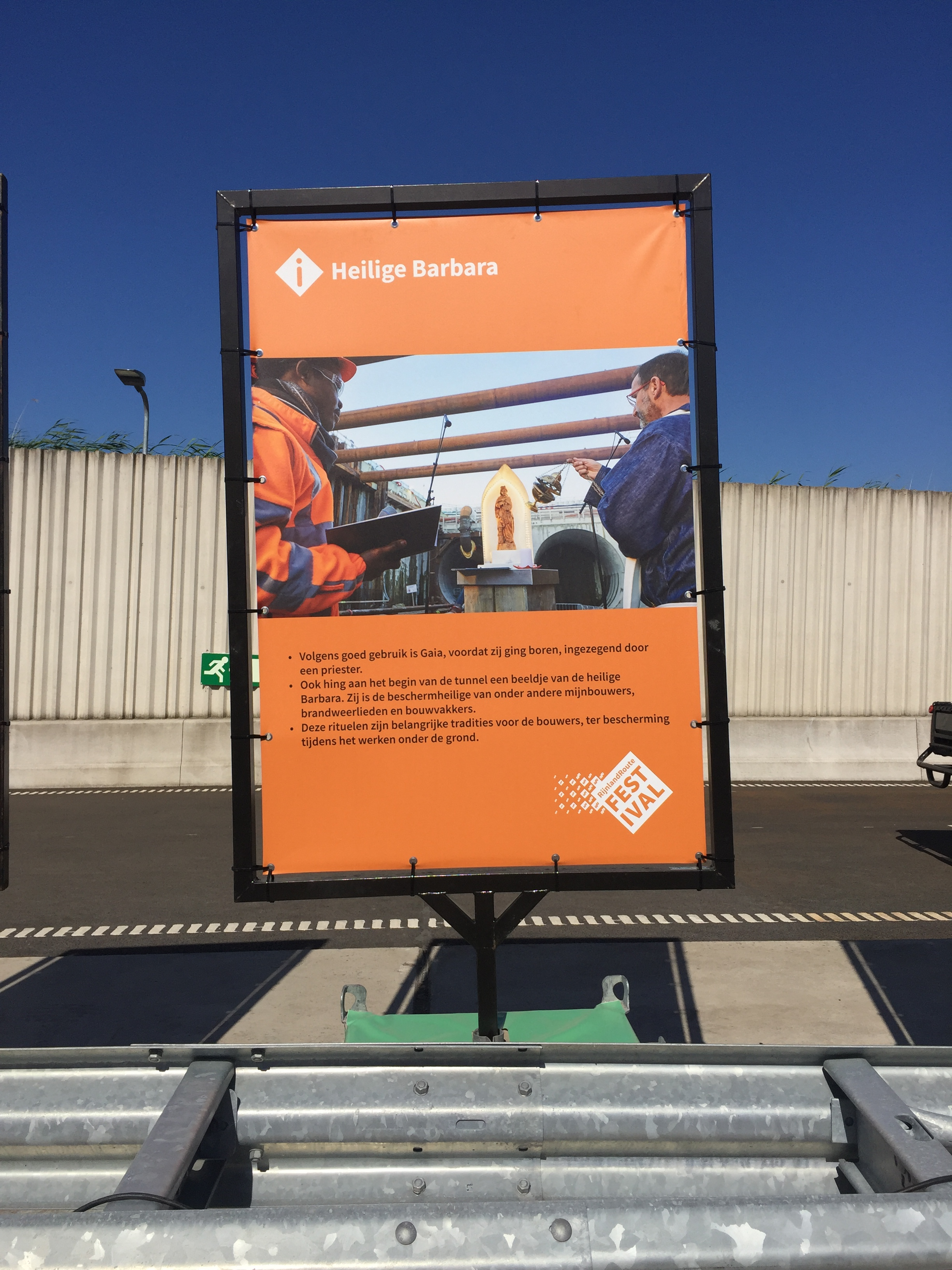
Information sign about the blessing of the tunnel by Saint Barbara

During construction, several incidents occurred. In 2019, a construction worker was killed when an anchor plate became detached during drilling operations. In addition, a fire broke out in storage facilities at the construction site in 2022, damaging equipment and materials.

In total, 41 incidents were recorded during construction. A subsequent investigation concluded that the province of South Holland had not exercised sufficient oversight regarding construction safety, although improvements were reportedly made following these findings.

== Opening ==
The Corbulotunnel opened to traffic on the morning of 5 July 2024, approximately two years later than originally planned. The opening marked the completion of a major component of the RijnlandRoute project. Vehicles are permitted to travel through the tunnel at a maximum speed of 80 km/h.
