= Off-road transport =

Off-road transport is moving people or articles on land without the use of paved roads, typically using off-road vehicles.

== Off-roading ==
Off-roading is the activity of driving or riding a vehicle on unsurfaced roads or tracks, made of materials such as sand, gravel, riverbeds, mud, snow, rocks, and other natural terrain.

== Off-road racing ==
Off-road racing is a format of racing where various classes of specially modified vehicles (including cars, trucks, motorcycles, and buggies) compete in races through off-road environments.

== Off-road vehicle ==
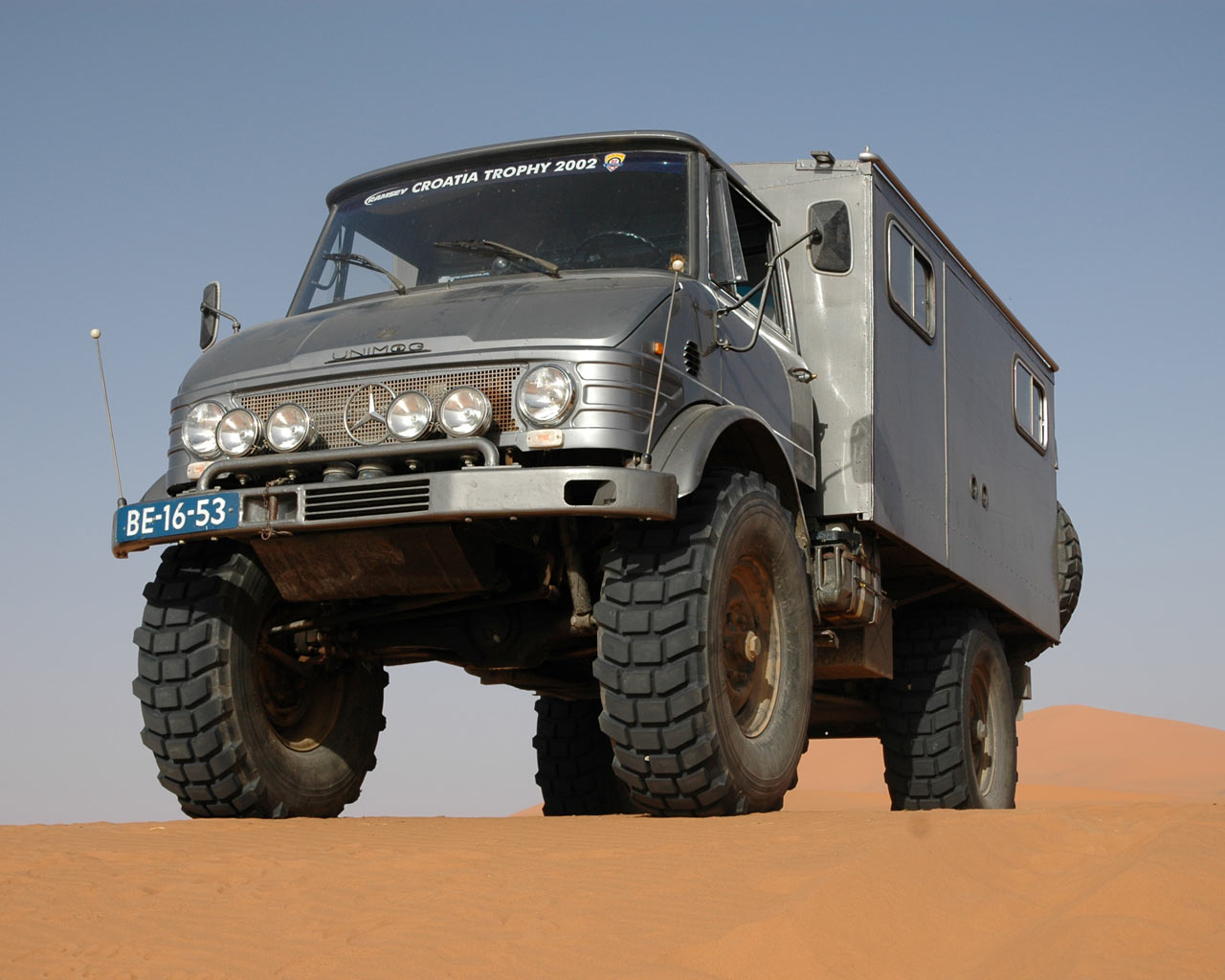
Mercedes-Benz Unimog in the Dunes of Erg Chebbi in Morocco. Note the high ground clearance due to Portal gear axles

An off-road vehicle is considered to be any type of vehicle which is capable of driving on and off paved or gravel surface. It is generally characterized by having large tires with deep, open treads, a flexible suspension, or even caterpillar tracks. Other vehicles that do not travel public streets or highways are generally termed off-highway vehicles, including tractors, forklifts, cranes, backhoes, bulldozers, and golf carts.

Off-road vehicles have an enthusiastic following because of their many uses and versatility. The use of higher clearance and higher traction vehicles enables access on trails and forest roads that have rough and low traction surfaces.

== See also ==
- All-terrain tyre
- Cat train
- Land Rover
- Traction engine
- Unimog
