= Transport finance =

Transport finance is the subject that explores how transport networks are paid for.

The timing of the money required to finance transport is a principal issue. Many projects are "pay-as-you-go", that is infrastructure, which lasts many years, is expected to be paid out of ongoing cash flow. Other projects are financed with bonds raised in capital markets. Bonds must be secured with an expected future cash flow.

The cash flow, required for either pay-as-you-go or for bonds, must be raised. Common sources are user fees, such as gas taxes, and tolls. Other sources are general revenue. This issue is related to who bears the burden: users or the general public. Even if users bear the burden, that class must be subdivided, e.g. users during peak times or off-peak, freight or passenger traffic, urban or rural users, residents or non-residents (many toll plazas are located on the state line to maximize revenue from non-residents).

A third issue concerns the full costs of transportation. There are monetary costs, which are financed with money, as considered above, but there are also non-monetary costs (sometimes called hidden costs), which are paid for by people's time, by clean air, by peace and quiet, etc. See the discussion of externalities for a fuller explication of non-monetary costs.

== See also ==
- Transport divide
- Transport economics
