= European route E35 in the Netherlands =

European route E 35
- Europese weg E35
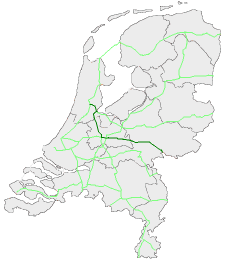
- European routes in the Netherlands with E 35 in dark green

Route information
- Maintained by Rijkswaterstaat
- Length: 130 km (81 mi)

Major junctions
- North end: E22 / A 8 / A 10 in Amsterdam
- E231 / A 1 in Amsterdam; E19 / A 10 / A 2 / S 110 in Amsterdam; A 9 in Amsterdam; E25 / E30 / A 2 / A 12 in Utrecht; E30 / E311 / A 27 in Utrecht; A 30 in Ede; A 50 in Arnhem; A 348 / N 325 in Arnhem; A 18 in Zevenaar
- South end: E35 / A 3 at Germany border

Location
- Country: Kingdom of the Netherlands
- Constituent country: Netherlands
- Provinces: North Holland, Utrecht, Gelderland

Highway system
- International E-road network; A Class; B Class
← E34	→ E231

European route E 35 (E 35) is a north–south European route, running from Amsterdam in the Netherlands to Rome in Italy. In the Netherlands, the highway runs from its northern terminus in Amsterdam eastwards through Utrecht and Arnhem to the German border, near Zevenaar. The road runs concurrently with three other motorways over its entire length, starting on Rijksweg 10 (A10) around Amsterdam, then A2 from southern Amsterdam up to Utrecht, and the last part on A12 until it reaches the German border in the east.

The highway is maintained by Rijkswaterstaat.

== Route description ==
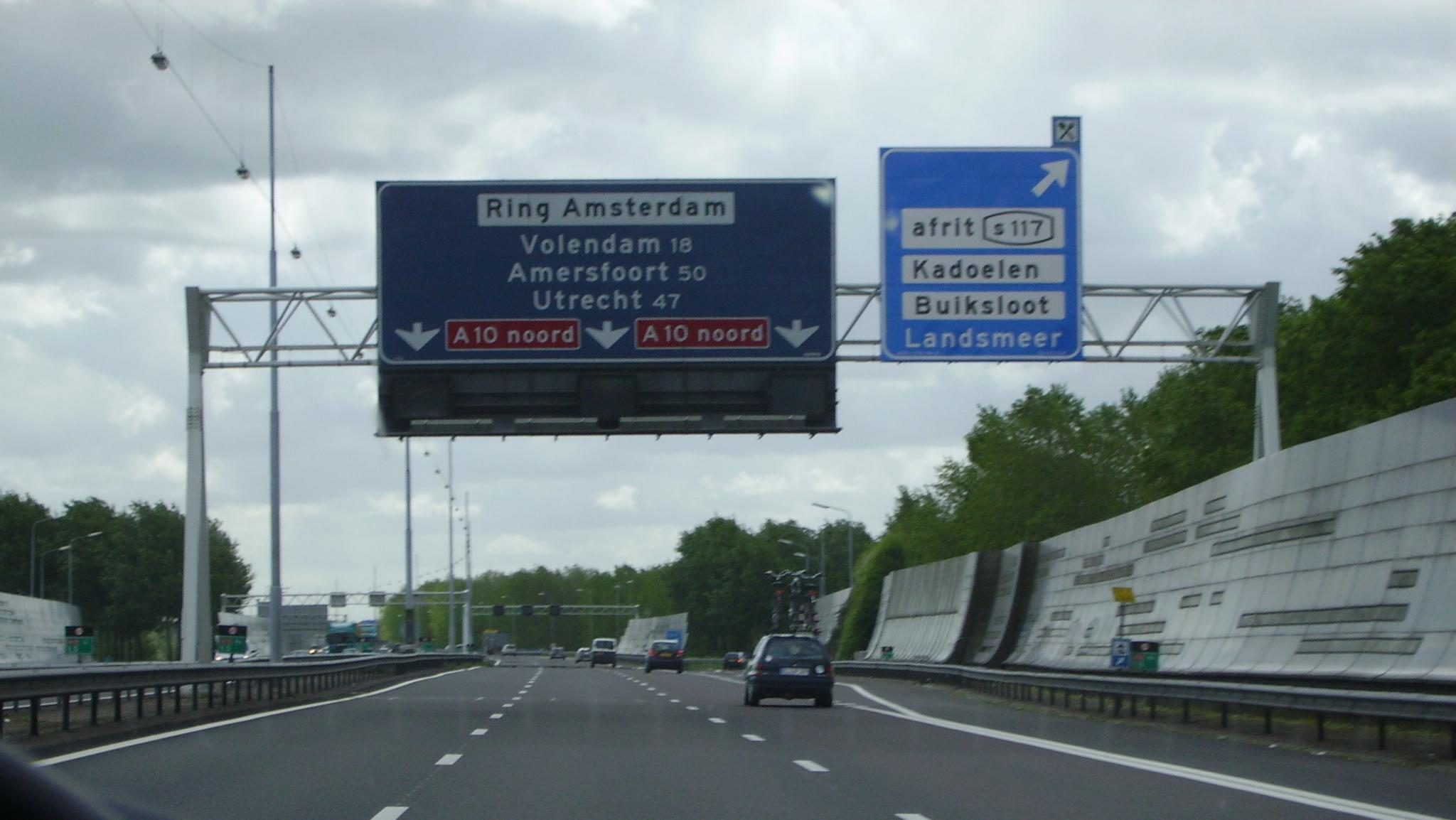
E 35 approaching exit 117 from the west, concurrent with A10

=== Amsterdam ===
E 35 begins in northern Amsterdam at an interchange with A10 / E 22 and A8 / E 22, where it runs to the south–east concurrently with A10, the orbital road around Amsterdam. The highway follows the route of A10 through eastern Amsterdam where it runs southwards under the Buiten-IJ using the Zeeburgertunnel, and then using the Zeeburgerbrug over the IJmeer, Nieuwe Diep and Amsterdam–Rhine Canal. After running across these waters, the road approaches the Watergraafsmeer interchange, where A1 / E 231 starts at its western terminus. The road continues around Amsterdam and runs westwards to the Amstel interchange just before bridging over the Amstel river. At this interchange, E 35 splits off of A10, which is also signed E 19 from this point on, and continues onto the emerging A2 southwards.

=== Amsterdam to Utrecht ===
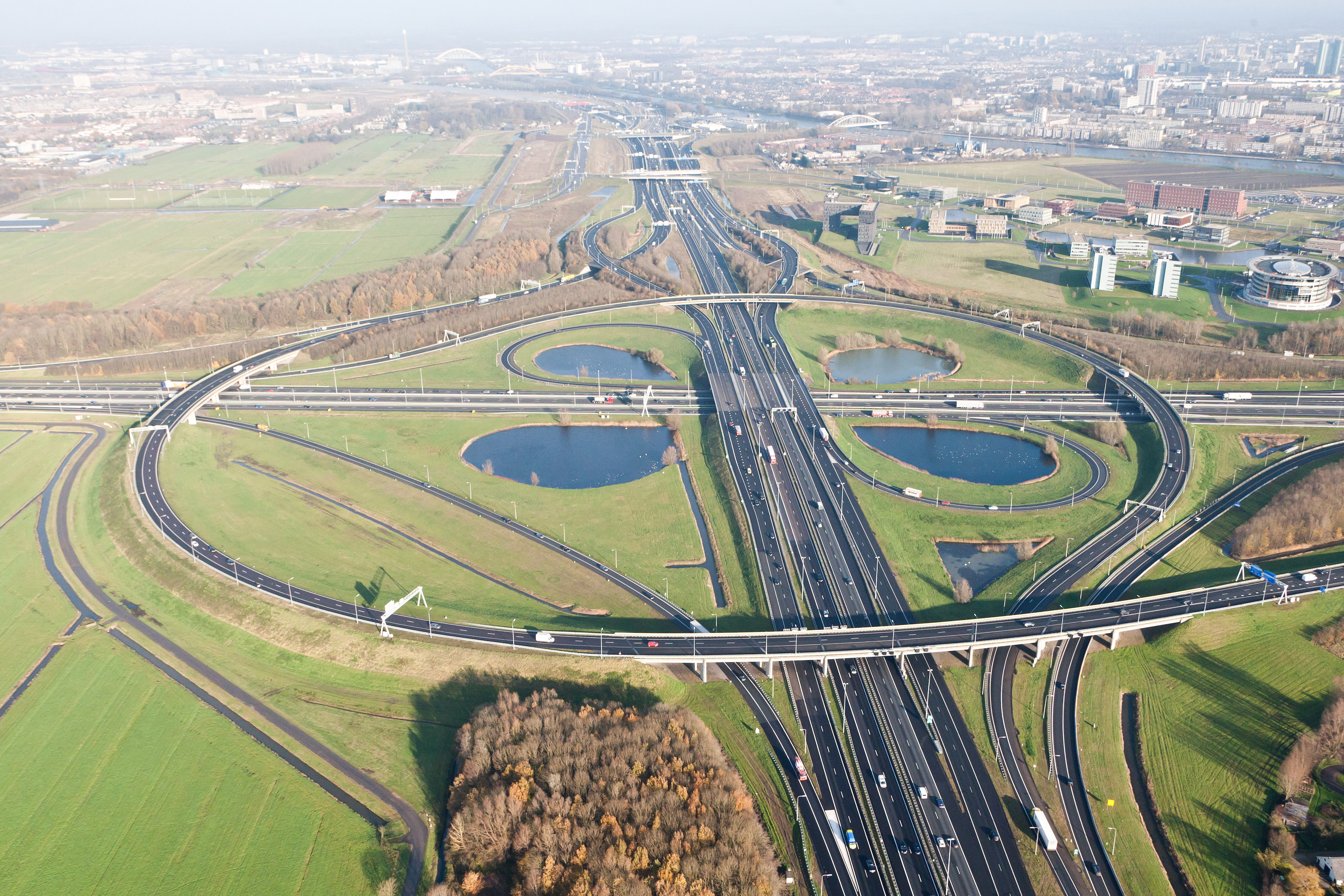
Looking north over the Oudernrijn interchange where E 35 enters from the north and continues eastwards

On A2, the highway leaves Amsterdam and continues southwards to get to the Holendrecht interchange with A9. This interchange is divided into two parts, starting with a trumpet interchange, where A9 joins the road from the east, and runs for about 1.5 kilometres (0.93 mi) concurrently with it to the south. At the second part, also a trumpet interchange, A9 splits off of the road again and continues to the west. Exit 2, an incomplete exit of A2 with a northbound exit and southbound entrance to Amsterdam-Zuidoost, can be found in the latter part of this interchange. Running further southwards, the highway leaves the province of North Holland just after crossing over the Holendrecht river, and enters Utrecht. After traversing through an agricultural area and passing by the Vinkeveense Plassen in Vinkeveen, just west of the road near the interchange with Provincial road N201 (N201), E 35 / A2 runs parallel to the Amsterdam–Rhine Canal towards the city of Utrecht. Running through western Utrecht, the highway gets close to the Oudenrijn interchange with A12 / E 30 / E 25, all three approaching the interchange from the east. At this interchange E 35 joins A12 / E 30 to the east, while A2 continues southwards concurrently with E 25.

=== Utrecht to the German border ===
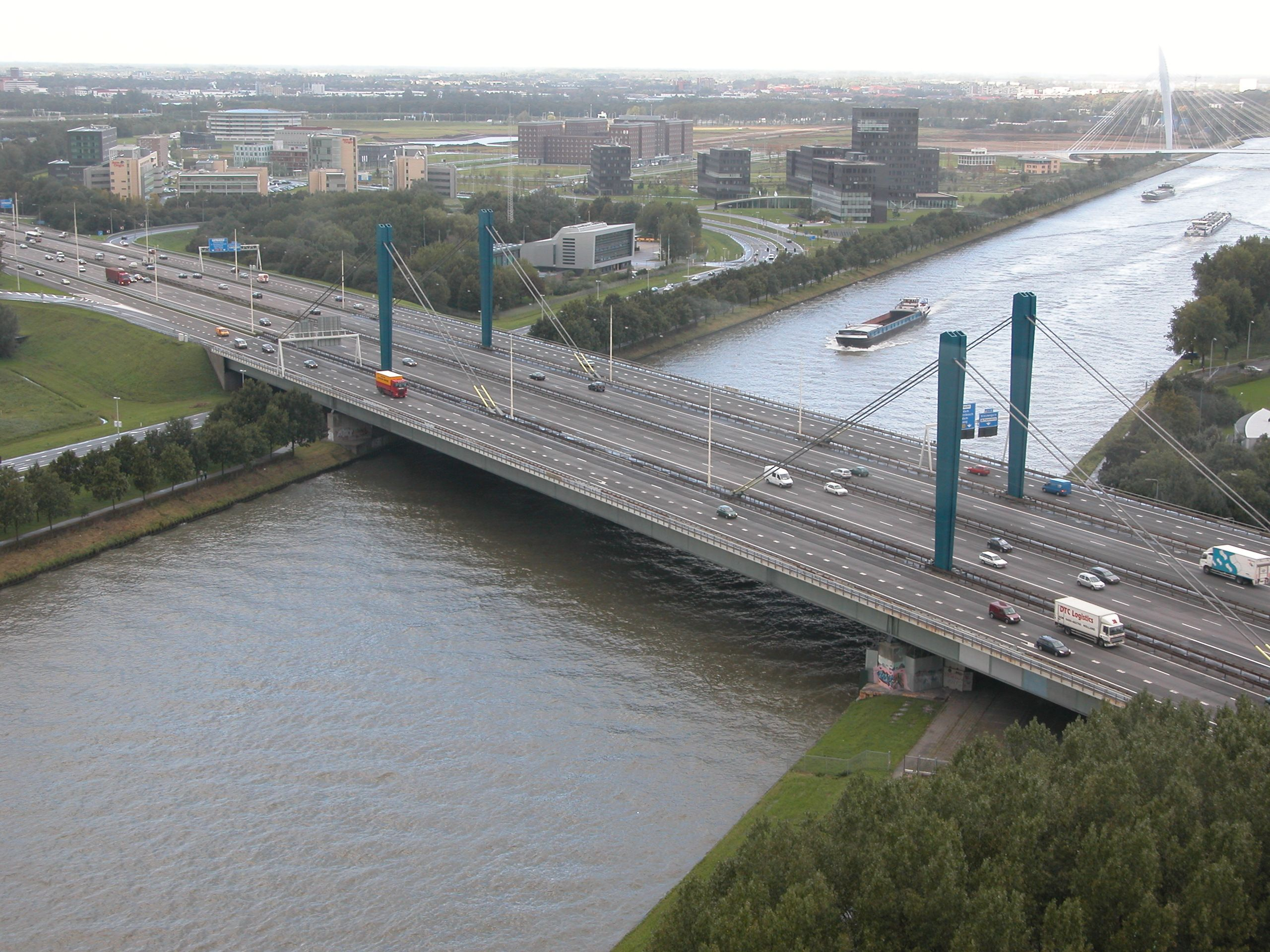
The Galecopperbrug across the Amsterdam–Rhine Canal as seen from the south–east

Concurrent with A12 / E 30, the highway runs eastwards and after some 2 kilometres (1.2 mi) it crosses over the Amsterdam–Rhine Canal using the Galecopperbrug. Continuing further to the east, E 35 moves towards the Lunetten interchange with A27, also labeled as E 311 to the south. At this interchange, E 30 splits off to the north, now concurrent with A27. From this point on only running with A12, the road carries on to the east, crossing the Kromme Rijn river at exit 19 near Odijk, where N229 splits off to the south. Just passed exit 20, where N225 starts its journey to the south in Driebergen, E 35 enters the Utrecht Hill Ridge, a ridge of low sandhills. Passing through this area, the highway is paralleled by the Amsterdam–Arnhem railway and both are bridged over by two wildlife crossings, the first one, the Mollebos ecoduct between exit 20 and 21, and the second one, ecoduct Rumelaar, between exit 22 and the Bloemheuvel / Oudenhorst rest area, both constructed in 2012. The road leaves the province of Utrecht and enters Gelderland between Veenendaal and Ede. After less than 2 kilometres (1.2 mi), the road runs through the Maanderbroek interchange with A30 to the north. After passing by Ede, E 35 enters the forest–rich ridge of the Veluwe, in which another wildlife crossing bridges over the road, the Jac. P. Thijsse ecoduct, just before exit 25, Oosterbeek, with N224. From the south, A50 joins the highway to the east for a little more than 6 kilometres (3.7 mi), when it branches off to the north, just north of the city of Arnhem. Leaving the Veluwe and now passing through Arnhem to the south–east, E 35 is provided with a Noise barrier up to the Velperbroek interchange with A348 to the north, and N325 to the south. Shortly after this interchange, river IJssel is crossed over by the road using the IJsselbrug and enters Duiven. Continuing towards the German border, the highway approaches an incomplete interchange with a southbound exit and northbound entrance only, the Oud–Dijk interchange with A18 splitting off to the north–east. After exit 30 with N812, the German border runs parallel to the road to the south–west for about 500 metres (1,600 ft), and after that, the southbound lane passes into Germany, while the northbound lane continues for another 350 metres (1,150 ft) in the Netherlands, passing by the 2theloo rest area. After crossing the country line, E 35 in Germany enters the state of North Rhine-Westphalia, and now runs concurrently with Bundesautobahn 3 (A 3).

== History ==
The first part of the E35 where the road is concurrent with the A10 was opened on December 6, 1989. The first part of the E35 where the road is concurrent with the A2 was opened in May 1938. The first part of the E35 where the road is concurrent with the A12 was opened on November 25, 1939.

== Exit list ==
Province	Municipality	km	mi	Exit	Destinations	Notes
North Holland	Amsterdam	0.000	0.000		E22 north / A 8 north (Coentunnelweg) / A 10 south (Ringweg Noord) – Zaandam, Amsterdam	Northern end of A10 concurrency
North Holland	Amsterdam			s118	S 118 (Verlengde Stellingweg)	
North Holland	Amsterdam			s117	S 117 south (IJdoornlaan)	
North Holland	Amsterdam			s116	N 247 south / S 116 north (Nieuwe Leeuwarderweg) – Broek in Waterland	
North Holland	Amsterdam			s115	S 115 west (Zuiderzeeweg)	
Buiten-IJ				Zeeburgertunnel		
North Holland	Amsterdam			s114	S 114 (IJburglaan)	
IJmeer				Zeeburgerbrug		
Nieuwe Diep				Zeeburgerbrug		
Amsterdam–Rhine Canal				Zeeburgerbrug		
North Holland	Amsterdam				E231 east / A 1 east – Muiden	
North Holland	Amsterdam			s113	S 113 (Middenweg / Hartveldseweg)	
North Holland	Amsterdam			s112	S 112 (Gooiseweg)	
North Holland	Amsterdam			s111	S 111 (Spaklerweg)	
North Holland	Amsterdam			s110	E19 west / A 10 west (Ringweg Zuid) / A 2 south / S 110 north (Nieuwe Utrechtseweg) – Badhoevedorp, Abcoude	Southern end of A10 concurrency; northern end of A2 concurrency
North Holland	Ouder-Amstel			1	N 522 east (Burgemeester Stramanweg) – Amstelveen	
North Holland	Ouder-Amstel				A 9 west (Gaasperdammerweg) – Amsterdam-Zuidoost	Northern end of A9 concurrency
North Holland	Ouder-Amstel				A 9 west (Burgemeester van Sonweg) – Amstelveen	Southern end of A9 concurrency
North Holland	Amsterdam			2	S 111 north (Meibergdreef)	Northbound exit and southbound entrance
Utrecht	De Ronde Venen			3	Burgemeester Des Tombeweg	
Utrecht	Stichtse Vecht				N 201 (Provincialeweg) – Vinkeveen, Vreeland	
Utrecht	Stichtse Vecht			Ruwiel rest area Northbound exit and entrance		
Utrecht	Stichtse Vecht			5	N 401 west (Breukelerwaard / Provincialeweg) / Amerlandseweg – Kockengen, Breukelen	
Utrecht	Stichtse Vecht			Haarrijn rest area Southbound exit and entrance		
Utrecht	Stichtse Vecht			6	N 230 east (Zuilense Ring / Ring Utrecht) / Haarrijnse Rading south – Maarssenbroek, Vleuten	
Utrecht	Utrecht			7	Lageweideviaduct / Soestwetering	
Utrecht	Utrecht			8	N 198 west (Stadsbaan) / Dominee Martin Luther Kinglaan – De Meern, Utrecht	
Utrecht	Utrecht				E25 south / E30 / A 2 south / A 12 (Ring Utrecht) – Nieuwegein, Utrecht	Southern end of A2 concurrency; western end of E 30 / /A12 concurrency
Utrecht	Utrecht			16	Papendorpseweg	
Amsterdam–Rhine Canal				Galecopperbrug		
Utrecht	Utrecht			17	Europalaan	
Utrecht	Utrecht				N 408 south (Laagravenseweg) / Waterlinieweg – Nieuwegein, Utrecht	
Utrecht	Utrecht				E30 north / E311 south / A 27 (Ring Utrecht) – Utrecht, Houten	Eastern end of E 30 concurrency
Utrecht	Bunnik			De Forten rest area Eastbound exit and entrance		
Utrecht	Bunnik			19	N 229 south (Schoudermantel) / Baan van Fectio – Bunnik, Odijk	
Utrecht	Utrechtse Heuvelrug			20	N 225 east (Hoofdstraat) – Driebergen, Zeist	
Utrecht	Utrechtse Heuvelrug			21	N 227 – Maarn, Doorn	Eastbound exit and westbound entrance only
Utrecht	Utrechtse Heuvelrug			22	N 226 (Woudenbergseweg) – Maarsbergen, Woudenberg, Leersum	
Utrecht	Utrechtse Heuvelrug			Bloemheuvel rest area eastbound Oudenhorst rest area westbound		
Utrecht	Utrechtse Heuvelrug			23	N 418 north (Nieuweweg-Noord) / Rondweg-West – Veenendaal	
Utrecht	Utrechtse Heuvelrug			23a	N 233 south (Rondweg-Oost) / Rondweg De Klomp – Veenendaal	
Gelderland	Ede				A 30 north – Ede	
Gelderland	Ede			24	N 781 south (Dr. W. Dreeslaan) – Ede, Bennekom	
Gelderland	Ede			Buunderkamp rest area eastbound 't Ginkelse Zand rest area westbound		
Gelderland	Ede			25	N 224 (Verlengde Arnhemseweg / Amsterdamseweg) – Ede, Arnhem	
Gelderland	Arnhem				A 50 south – Heelsum	Eastern end of A50 concurrency
Gelderland	Arnhem			De Schaars rest area Westbound exit and entrance		
Gelderland	Arnhem				A 50 north (Delhuijzenweg) – Beekbergen	Western end of A50 concurrency
Gelderland	Arnhem			26	N 784 (Apeldoornseweg) – Arnhem	
Gelderland	Arnhem				A 348 east (IJsselweg) / N 325 west (IJsseloordweg) – Rheden, Arnhem	
IJssel				IJsselbrug		
Gelderland	Duiven			27	N 338 east (Rivierweg) – Lathum, Westervoort	
Gelderland	Duiven			28	N 810 south (Noordsingel) – Duiven	
Gelderland	Duiven			Oudbroeken rest area eastbound Aalburgen rest area westbound		
Gelderland	Zevenaar			29	N 813 east (Nieuwe Steeg / Tatelaarsweg) / N 336 (Doesburgseweg) – Didam, Zevenaar	
Gelderland	Zevenaar				A 18 east – Didam	Eastbound exit and westbound entrance only
Gelderland	Zevenaar			30	N 812 (Beekseweg) – Babberich, Beek	
Gelderland	Zevenaar			2theloo rest area Northbound exit and entrance		
Gelderland	Zevenaar				E35 / A 3 east – Babberich, Elten	Continuation into Germany; eastern end of A12 concurrency; western end of A 3 concurrency
1.000 mi = 1.609 km; 1.000 km = 0.621 mi: Concurrency terminus; Incomplete access

== See also ==
European route E35
Previous country: Terminus	Netherlands	Next country: Germany
