= Provincial road N229 (Netherlands) =

Highway in the Netherlands

Provincial highway 229
- Provinciale weg 229
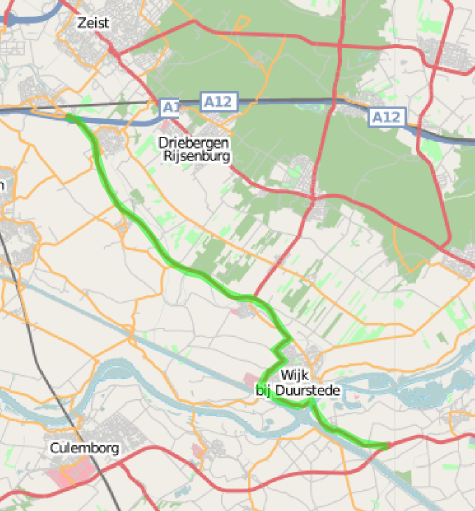

Major junctions
- North end: E35 / A 12 – Bunnik
- East end: N 320

Location
- Country: Kingdom of the Netherlands
- Constituent country: Netherlands
- Provinces: Utrecht, Gelderland

Highway system
- Roads in the Netherlands; Motorways; E-roads; Provincial; City routes

Provincial road N229 is a Dutch provincial road in Utrecht and Gelderland. It connects with the A12 at Bunnik and runs past Odijk, Werkhoven, Cothen and Wijk bij Duurstede to Rijswijk.
