= S117 (Amsterdam) =

City route in Amsterdam, the Netherlands

City route 117
- Stadsroute 117

Major junctions
- West end: E35 / A 10 – Amsterdam
- East end: S 116 – Amsterdam

Location
- Country: Kingdom of the Netherlands
- Constituent country: Netherlands
- Provinces: North Holland
- Municipalities: Amsterdam

Highway system
- Roads in the Netherlands; Motorways; E-roads; Provincial; City routes

S117 is a Dutch city route in Amsterdam. It follows the IJdoornlaan through Amsterdam-Noord and connects the S115 to the S116.
