= S118 =

S118 may refer to:

- Letov Š-118, a Czechoslovak aircraft
- USATC S118 Class, a 1942 class of 2-8-2 steam locomotive
- S118 (Amsterdam), a road in the Netherlands
