= S115 =

S115 may refer to:

- Greek submarine Katsonis (S-115) (1973-1993), a Tench class submarine
- SMS S115, a Großes Torpedoboot 1916 class torpedo boat of the Deutschen Kaiserliche Marine
- S115 road in Amsterdam
