= E231 =

E231 may refer to:

- 2-Phenylphenol, a food additive
- E231 series, a Japanese train type
- European route E231, a European Class-B road in the Netherlands
