= European route E30 in the Netherlands =

European route E 30
- Europese weg E30
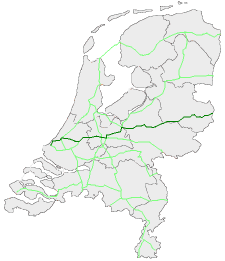
- European routes in the Netherlands with E 30 in dark green

Route information
- Maintained by Rijkswaterstaat

Major junctions
- West end: Ferry service at Hook of Holland
- A 4 / N 211 near The Hague; E19 / A 13 in The Hague; E19 / A 4 / A 12 in The Hague; E25 / A 20 in Waddinxveen; E35 / E25 / A 2 in Utrecht; E35 / E311 / A 12 / A 27 in Utrecht; A 27 / A 28 in Utrecht; E231 / E232 / A 1 / A 28 in Amersfoort; A 50 in Apeldoorn; A 35 near Borne
- East end: E30 / A 30 at Germany border

Location
- Country: Kingdom of the Netherlands
- Constituent country: Netherlands
- Provinces: South Holland, Utrecht, Gelderland, Overijssel

Highway system
- International E-road network; A Class; B Class
← E25	→ E31

European route E 30 (E 30) is a west–east European route, running from Cork in Ireland to Omsk in Russia. In the Netherlands, the highway runs from Hook of Holland eastwards through The Hague, Utrecht, Amersfoort and Apeldoorn to the German border, near De Lutte.

The highway is maintained by Rijkswaterstaat.

== Exit list ==
Province	Municipality	km	mi	Exit	Destinations	Notes
South Holland	Rotterdam	0.000	0.000		N 223	Western end of N223 concurrency
South Holland	Westland (municipality), Netherlands				N 213 north (Burg.Elsenweg) / %route% – Maasland	
South Holland	Westland (municipality), Netherlands				N 222 east / Piet Struijkweg – Naaldwijk, Naaldwijk	
South Holland	Westland (municipality), Netherlands				N 211 east (Wippolderlaan) – Wateringen	
South Holland	Midden-Delfland			12	A 4 / N 211	Eastern end of N211 concurrency; western end of A4 concurrency
South Holland	Rijswijk			11	S 106	
South Holland	Rijswijk			10	Diepenhorstlaan	
South Holland	The Hague			9	E19 / A 13 / Laan van Delfvliet	
South Holland	The Hague				E19 / A 4 / A 12	Eastern end of A4 concurrency; western end of A12 concurrency
South Holland	The Hague			5	Donau / Koning Willem-Alexanderviaduct	
South Holland	Zoetermeer			6	Zuidweg / Afrikaweg	Eastbound exit and westbound entrance
South Holland	Zoetermeer			7	N 470	
South Holland	Lansingerland			8	N 209	
South Holland	Zuidplas			9	N 219	
South Holland	Waddinxveen				E25 / A 20	Western end of E 25 concurrency
South Holland	Waddinxveen			11	N 452	
South Holland	Bodegraven-Reeuwijk			12	N 459	
South Holland	Bodegraven-Reeuwijk			12a	N 11	
South Holland	Bodegraven-Reeuwijk			13	Molendijk / Verlengde Tuurluur	
Utrecht	Woerden			14	N 204	
Utrecht	Woerden			14a	N 419	
Utrecht	Utrecht			15	N 198 / N 228	
Utrecht	Utrecht				E25 / E35 / A 2	Eastern end of E 25 concurrency; western end of E 35 concurrency
Utrecht	Utrecht			16	Papendorpseweg	
Amsterdam–Rhine Canal				Galecopperbrug		
Utrecht	Utrecht			17	Europalaan	
Utrecht	Utrecht			18	N 408 south (Laagravenseweg) / Waterlinieweg – Nieuwegein, Utrecht	
Utrecht	Utrecht				E35 / E311 / A 12 / A 27	Eastern end of E 35 / A12 concurrency; Southern end of A27 concurrency
Utrecht	Utrecht				A 27 / A 28	Northern end of A27 concurrency; western end of A28 concurrency
Utrecht	Utrecht			2	N 412	
Utrecht	Zeist			3	N 238	
Utrecht	Soest			4	N 413	
Utrecht	Leusden			5	N 221 / N 227	
Utrecht	Amersfoort			6	N 226	
Utrecht	Amersfoort–Leusden municipality line			7	Randweg	
Utrecht	Amersfoort			8	Hogeweg / Energieweg	
Utrecht	Amersfoort				E231 / E232 / A 1 / A 28	Eastern end of A28 concurrency; western end of A1 concurrency;
Utrecht	Amersfoort			14	Amersfoortsestraat / Westerdorpsstraat / Nijkerkerstraat	
Gelderland	Barneveld (municipality)			15		A 30 / N 301
Gelderland	Barneveld (municipality)			16	N 303 / N 805	
Gelderland	Barneveld (municipality)			17	N 310	
Gelderland	Apeldoorn			18	N 302	
Gelderland	Apeldoorn			19	N 304	
Gelderland	Apeldoorn			20	Kayersdijk	
Gelderland	Apeldoorn				A 50	
Gelderland	Apeldoorn			21	N 345	
Gelderland	Voorst			22	N 791	
Overijssel	Deventer			23	N 348	south
Overijssel	Deventer			24	N 348	north
Overijssel	Deventer			25	Marsdijk / Baarhorsterdijk	
Overijssel	Rijssen-Holten			26	N 332	
Overijssel	Rijssen-Holten			27	N 350 / N 755	
Overijssel	Wierden			28	N 347	
Overijssel	Borne				A 35	Western end of A35 concurrency
Overijssel	Borne			29	Kluft	
Overijssel	Borne				A 35	Eastern end of A35 concurrency
Overijssel	Hengelo			30	Rondweg / Bornestraat	
Overijssel	Hengelo			31	Oldenzaalsestraat / Hasselerbaan	
Overijssel	Oldenzaal			32	Provinciale rondweg	
Overijssel	Oldenzaal			33	N 733	
Overijssel	Losser			34	N 735	
Overijssel	Losser				E30 / A 30	Continuation into Germany; eastern end of A1 concurrency; western end of A 30 concurrency
1.000 mi = 1.609 km; 1.000 km = 0.621 mi: Concurrency terminus; Incomplete access

== See also ==
European route E30
Previous country: United Kingdom	Netherlands	Next country: Germany
