= A30 motorway (Netherlands) =

Motorway in the Netherlands

A30 motorway
- Rijksweg 30
- Location of the A30 motorway

Major junctions
- North end: A12 in Ede
- South end: A1 in Barneveld

Location
- Country: Kingdom of the Netherlands
- Constituent country: Netherlands
- Provinces: Gelderland

Highway system
- Roads in the Netherlands; Motorways; E-roads; Provincial; City routes

The A30 motorway is a motorway in the Netherlands. It is located entirely in the Dutch province of Gelderland.

== Overview ==
The 18 kilometer long motorway connects the A12 motorway near Ede with the A1 near Barneveld. No European routes travel along the A30 motorway.

The section near the A1 motorway is not built at motorway standards. On some connections, for example between the A30 and the eastern section of the A1, drivers will have to pass traffic lights. For the busy relations between the A30 and the western part of the A1 and vice versa, bypasses have been created to avoid heavy congestion.

== Exit list ==
The entire route is in Gelderland Province.

Municipality	km	mi	Exit	Name	Destinations	Notes
Ede, Netherlands	7	4.3	—	Interchange Maanderbroek	E35 / A 12	
Ede, Netherlands	8	5.0	1	Industrial park Ede	Schuttersweg / Galvanistraat	
Ede, Netherlands	10	6.2	2	Ede-Noord	N 224 (Rijksweg)	
Ede, Netherlands	15	9.3	3	Lunteren	Postweg / Scharrenburgersteeg	
Scherpenzeel, Gelderland	20	12	4	Scherpenzeel	N 802 / Renswoudsestraatweg / Plantagelaan	
Barneveld (municipality)	23	14	5	Industrial park Harselaar	Thorbeckelaan	
Barneveld (municipality)	25	16	—	Barneveld	E30 / A 1 / N 301 northwest	
1.000 mi = 1.609 km; 1.000 km = 0.621 mi
