= A27 motorway (Netherlands) =

Motorway in the Netherlands

A27 motorway
- Rijksweg 27
- Motorways in the Netherlands with the Rijksweg 27 part in bold

Route information
- Part of E312 / E311 / E30
- Maintained by Rijkswaterstaat

Major junctions
- South end: E19 / E312 / A 16 / A 58 near Breda

- E312 / E311 / A 58 in Bavel; A 59 near Raamsdonk; E31 / A 15 in Gorinchem; E25 / A 2 in Vianen; E30 / E35 / E311 / A 12 in Utrecht; E30 / A 28 in Utrecht; A 1 / E231 near Eemnes
- North end: A 6 in Almere

Location
- Country: Kingdom of the Netherlands
- Constituent country: Netherlands
- Provinces: North Brabant, South Holland, Utrecht, North Holland, Flevoland

Highway system
- Roads in the Netherlands; Motorways; E-roads; Provincial; City routes
← A 22	→ A 28

The A27 motorway is a motorway in the Netherlands. It is approximately 109 kilometers in length.

The A27 is located in the Dutch provinces North Brabant, South Holland, Utrecht, North Holland, and Flevoland. It connects the city of Breda with Almere. On its way, it passes the cities of Gorinchem, Utrecht and Hilversum.

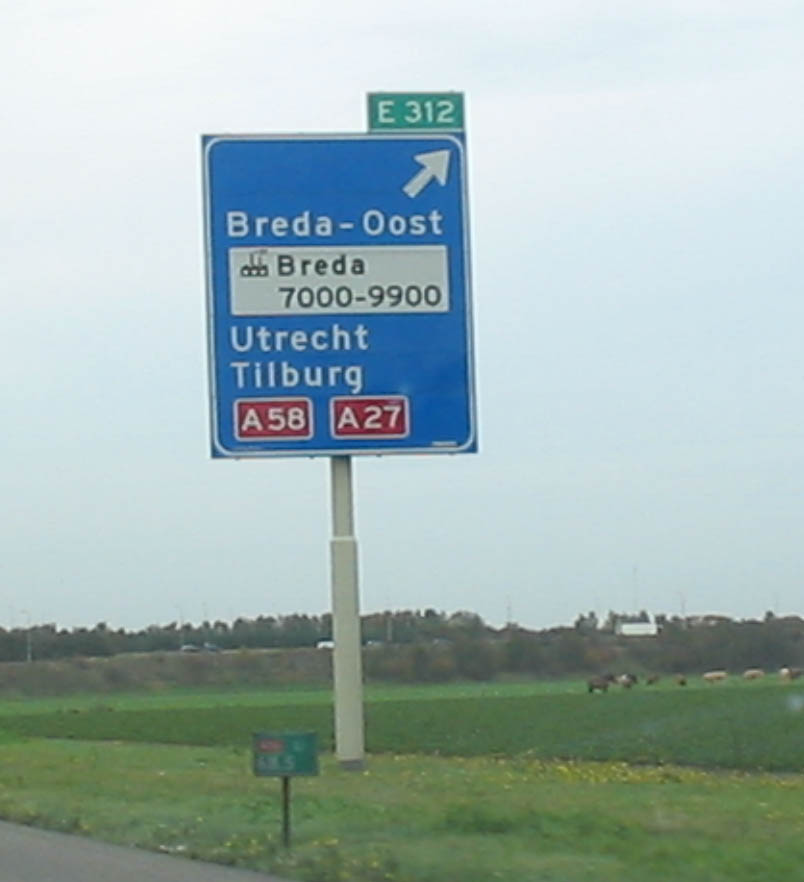
Reference to A58 and A27 on the A16.

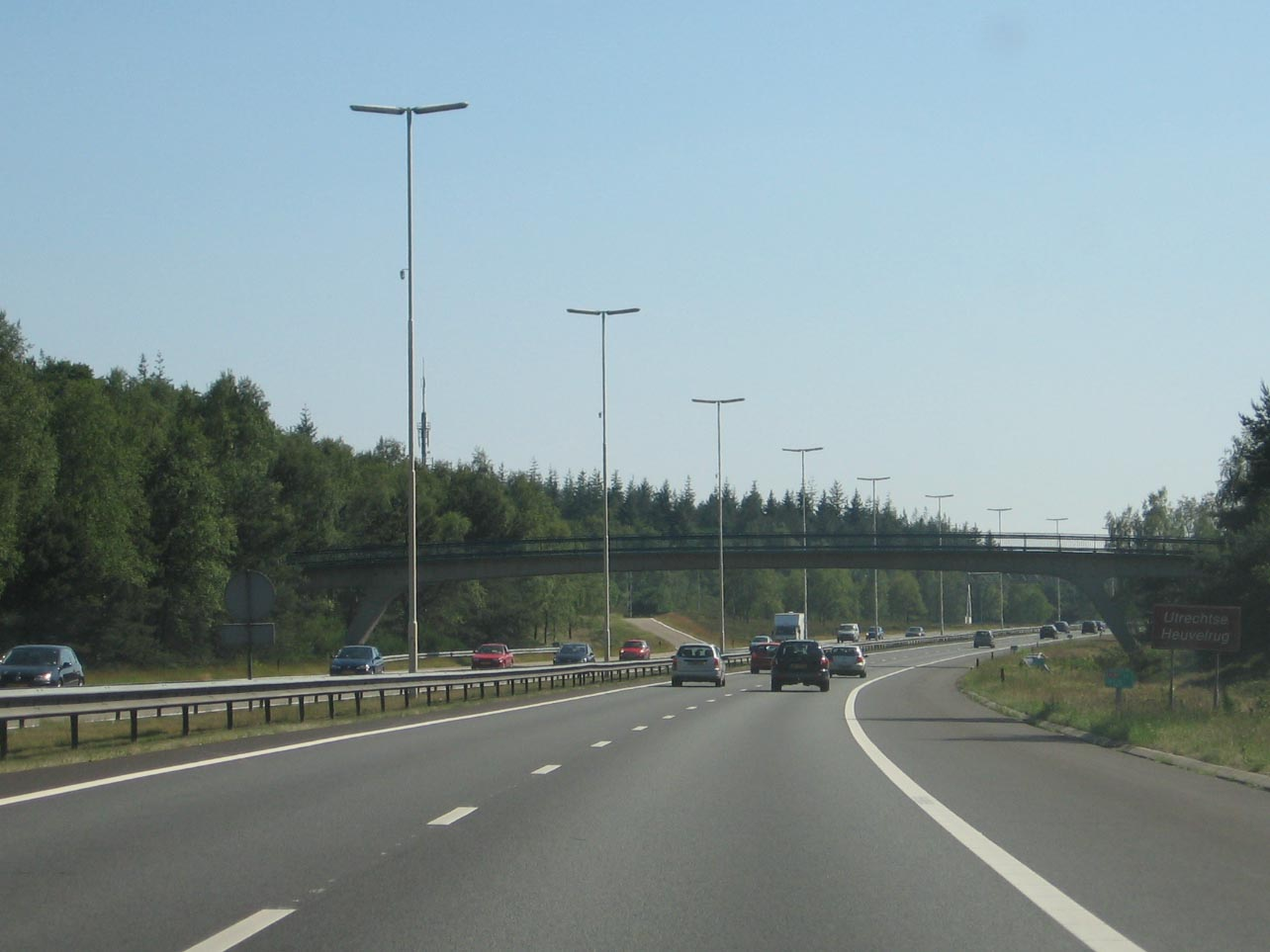
The A27 near Hilversum.

== Route description ==
=== 'Shared section' with A58 motorway ===
Although not officially a part of the Rijksweg 27, the section of the A58 motorway between interchanges Galder and Sint-Annabosch is also being referred to as A27, next to the road's official reference number A58.

Technically this situation is incorrect, since the A27's official start is only at interchange Sint-Annabosch. However, the reference A27 has probably been added to the road signs to help traffic coming from Antwerp in finding their way from the A16 / E19 towards the A27.

=== European routes ===
No major European routes follow the A27 motorway. The only one to follow it, is the E311 road between interchange Sint-Annabosch near Breda and interchange Lunetten near Utrecht. This section of the A27 immediately comprises the entire E311 road, since it does not follow any other roads.

Besides, the 'shared section' with the A58 is part of the European route E312.

== History ==
The northernmost section, connecting the town of Huizen with Almere, has been opened in 1999.

== Exit list ==
Province	Municipality	km	mi	Exit	Destinations	Notes
North Brabant	Breda			—	E19 / E312 / A 16 / A 58	West end of A58 and E 312 overlap
North Brabant	Breda			14	N 639 southeast (Chaamsebaan) / Chaamsebaan	
North Brabant	Breda			—	E311 / E312 / A 58	East end of A58 and E 312 overlap; south end of E 311 overlap
North Brabant	Breda			15	Franklin Rooseveltlaan	
North Brabant	Breda			16	N 282 east (Tilburgseweg) / Tilburgseweg	
North Brabant	Oosterhout			17	N 631 southeast (Vijf Eikenweg) / Europaweg	
North Brabant	Oosterhout			18	Wilhelminakanaal Noord	Northbound entrance and southbound exit only
North Brabant	Oosterhout			19	N 629 southeast (Ekelstraat) / Bovensteweg	
North Brabant	Geertruidenberg			—	A 59	
North Brabant	Geertruidenberg			20	Maasdijk / Keizersveer	
North Brabant	Werkendam			21	N 283 east (Provincialeweg) / Provincialeweg / Keizer Napoleonweg / Keizersveer / Kurenpolderweg	
North Brabant	Werkendam			22	N 322 east (Zevenbanseweg / Doornseweg) / Zevenbanseweg / Doornseweg	
North Brabant	Werkendam			23	Tol	
South Holland	Gorinchem			24	Nieuwe Wolpherensedijk	
South Holland	Gorinchem			—	E31 / A 15	
South Holland	Giessenlanden			25	N 214 west / Zijlkade / Parallelweg	
South Holland	Zederik			26	Lakerveld	
Utrecht	Vianen				E25 / A 2	
Utrecht	Vianen			27	Hagenweg / Ingenieur D.S. Tuijnmanweg	
Utrecht	Nieuwegein			28	Waterliniedok / De Kroon	
Utrecht	Houten			29	De Staart	
Utrecht	Utrecht			—	E30 / E35 / E311 south / A 12	North end of E 311 overlap; south end of E 30 overlap
Utrecht	Utrecht			—	E30 / A 28	North end of E 30 overlap
Utrecht	Utrecht			30	Blitse Rading	
Utrecht	Utrecht			31	N 230 northwest	
Utrecht	De Bilt			32	N 234 east (Nieuwe Weteringseweg) / N 417 northeast (Koningin Wilhelminaweg)	
North Holland	Hilversum			33	Diependaalselaan / Oostereind	
Utrecht	Eemnes			—	E231 / A 1	
Utrecht	Eemnes			34	Verlegde Laarderweg / Zuidersingel	
North Holland–Utrecht province line	Huizen			35	Randweg Oost / Stichtseweg	
Flevoland	Almere			36	N 305 (Gooiseweg / Waterlandseweg)	
Flevoland	Almere			37	N 706 (Vogelweg)	
Flevoland	Almere			—	A 6	
1.000 mi = 1.609 km; 1.000 km = 0.621 mi: Concurrency terminus; Incomplete access

== See also ==
- List of motorways in the Netherlands
- List of E-roads in the Netherlands
