= A10 motorway (Netherlands) =

Motorway ring road around Amsterdam, Netherlands

A10 motorway
- Rijksweg 10
- Location of the A10 motorway

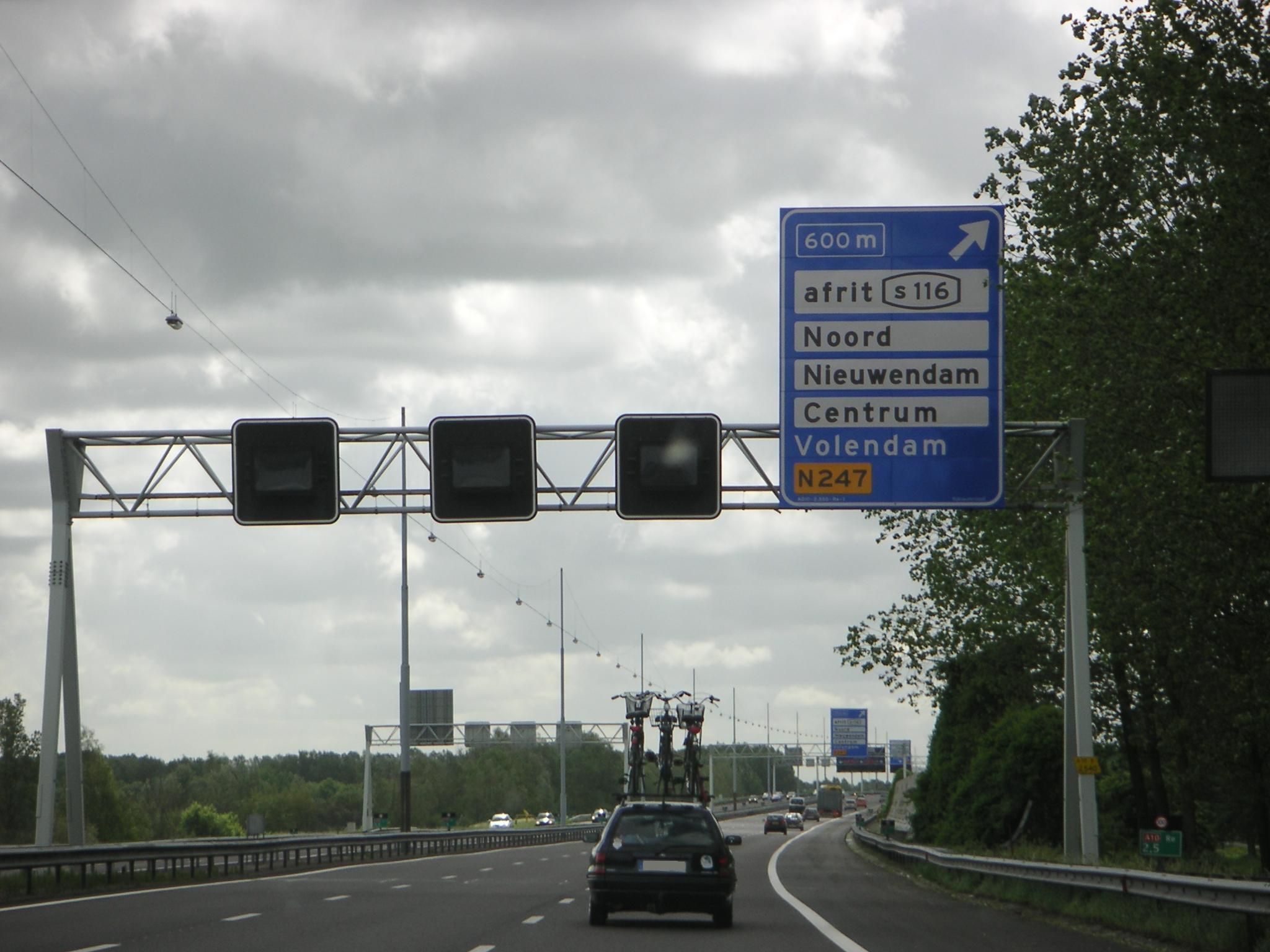
- The A10 near exit S116 in Amsterdam-Noord

Route information
- Part of E19 / E22 / E35
- Length: 32.3 km (20.1 mi)

Major junctions
- Orbital around Amsterdam

Location
- Country: Kingdom of the Netherlands
- Constituent country: Netherlands
- Provinces: North Holland

Highway system
- Roads in the Netherlands; Motorways; E-roads; Provincial; City routes

The A10 motorway (Dutch: Rijksweg 10), commonly known as the Amsterdam Ring (Ring Amsterdam), is a 32.3-kilometre (20.1 mi) motorway forming a complete ring around the central part of Amsterdam, Netherlands. It is the only motorway in the Netherlands that retains the same route number for an entire motorway ring around a city.

Five other motorways connect with the A10. The A8 and A5 meet the ring at Coenplein, the A4 at De Nieuwe Meer, the A2 at Amstel, and the A1 at Watergraafsmeer.

Three European routes use sections of the A10. The E22 follows the western part between De Nieuwe Meer and Coenplein, the E19 follows the southern section between De Nieuwe Meer and Amstel, and the E35 follows the eastern and northern sections between Amstel and Coenplein.

Construction of the motorway began in the 1960s. The first section opened in 1966, while the ring was completed in 1990 with the opening of the Zeeburgertunnel. The A10 is one of the busiest roads in the Netherlands and is a major component of the road network of the Amsterdam metropolitan area.

== Route and urban role ==
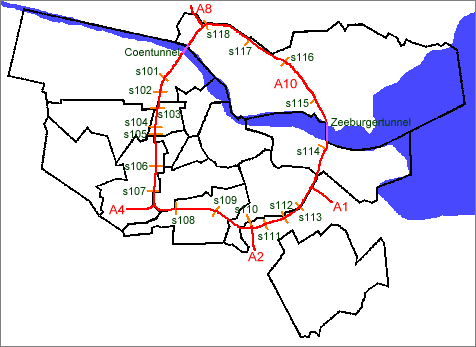
The A10 ring road around Amsterdam

The motorway is generally divided into four sections:

- A10 West, between Coenplein and De Nieuwe Meer;
- A10 South (A10 Zuid), between De Nieuwe Meer and Amstel;
- A10 East (A10 Oost), between Amstel and Watergraafsmeer;
- A10 North (A10 Noord), between Watergraafsmeer and Coenplein.

The ring crosses several major waterways. In the northwest the Coentunnel carries the A10 beneath the North Sea Canal. In the east, the Zeeburgerbrug crosses the Amsterdam–Rhine Canal and the Zeeburgertunnel passes beneath the Buiten-IJ. In the south, the motorway crosses the Nieuwe Meer on the Schinkelbrug and the Amstel on the Rozenoordbrug.

Although it is known as the Amsterdam Ring, the A10 does not enclose the entire municipality. Large urban districts including parts of Amsterdam Nieuw-West, Buitenveldert, Amsterdam-Zuidoost, IJburg and Weesp lie outside it. The distinction between locations inside the Ring and outside the Ring has nevertheless become a widely used geographical and social reference in Amsterdam.

Most exits connect with Amsterdam's numbered stadsroutes (city routes). Their numbering broadly corresponds with the A10 exit numbers: exit 1 connects to S101, exit 2 to S102, and so on up to exit 18 and S118. The S100 is the inner-city ring route.

The motorway kilometre numbering begins at Coenplein and runs clockwise. The exit numbering runs in the opposite direction.

== History ==
Planning for a major road around the western side of Amsterdam began in the 1930s. An urban road, the Multatuliweg, was constructed along part of the later route in the post-war period. As car ownership and regional traffic increased, the planned urban route developed into a motorway ring.

Construction of the A10 began in 1962. The first motorway section, including the first Coentunnel and the route between Coenplein and western Amsterdam, opened in 1966. A10 West was subsequently extended southwards and was completed in 1975. It was formerly also known as the Einsteinweg.

A10 South between De Nieuwe Meer and Amstel was completed in 1981. The eastern section, connecting the A2 at Amstel with the A1 at Watergraafsmeer, opened in 1989.

The northern section was the final part of the ring. Construction of the Zeeburgertunnel began in 1984. The 546-metre (1,791 ft) tunnel passes beneath the Buiten-IJ and has two tubes, each containing three traffic lanes, with a central emergency passage. Its opening in late September 1990 completed the motorway ring after almost three decades of construction.

The A10 was therefore developed in the order West, South, East and North.

=== Coentunnel expansion ===
The original Coentunnel opened in 1966. Traffic through it grew from approximately 10,000 vehicles per day in 1966 to about 100,000 per day in 1989, making it a major bottleneck.

Construction of the Second Coentunnel began in 2010 and the new tunnel opened in 2013. The original tunnel was subsequently renovated. More than 130,000 vehicles now pass through the combined Coentunnel complex each day; Rijkswaterstaat states that the infrastructure has capacity for approximately 180,000 vehicles per day.

== Traffic ==
The A10 is one of the most heavily used parts of the Dutch motorway network. Traffic volumes vary considerably around the ring.

A10 South, between De Nieuwe Meer and Amstel, carries approximately 150,000 vehicles on an average weekday. During peak periods around 9,000 vehicles per hour use the section. Roughly half of the traffic is through traffic and half has a destination in Amsterdam or the Zuidas.

More than 130,000 vehicles per day use the Coentunnel. The Zeeburgertunnel carries approximately 130,000 vehicles per day and forms an important road connection between Amsterdam-Noord and the eastern side of the city.

Traffic on the ring is managed using variable-message signs, ramp metering and other forms of dynamic traffic management. Around the Coentunnel, available road capacity can be adjusted according to traffic conditions.

== Zuidasdok ==
A10 South is undergoing a major reconstruction as part of the Zuidasdok infrastructure programme. The works cover approximately 6 kilometres (3.7 mi) between the De Nieuwe Meer and Amstel interchanges and form part of a programme scheduled to run from 2024 to 2037.

The motorway is being widened from four to six lanes in each direction. Four lanes will serve through traffic, while two parallel lanes will serve local traffic using exits S108 and S109. Both De Nieuwe Meer and Amstel interchanges are being extensively reconstructed to accommodate the new arrangement.

In the central Zuidas district, more than one kilometre of the motorway will be placed underground between the Buitenveldert cemetery and Beatrixpark. The tunnels will create approximately 100,000 m^{2} (1,100,000 sq ft) of space above ground for the expansion of Amsterdam Zuid station and new public space.

Construction of the motorway tunnels is expected to begin in 2027, with completion currently scheduled for 2035. Reconstruction of De Nieuwe Meer is scheduled for completion in 2031, while the Amstel interchange is scheduled for completion in 2037. Rijkswaterstaat notes that the programme schedule remains subject to change.

== Greater Amsterdam ring ==
Since the completion of the A5 Westrandweg and the Second Coentunnel, a larger continuous motorway route can be driven around Amsterdam using A10 North, the A1, A9 and A5 before returning to the A10 at Coenplein.

In 2014, journalist Tijs van den Boomen described this approximately 54-kilometre (34 mi) route in Het Parool as the Grote Ring ("Greater Ring") of Amsterdam. It is not an officially designated ring road and has no separate route number; the article proposed the unused number A11, but that proposal has never been adopted officially.

The route can function as an alternative to sections of the A10 for through traffic or during congestion and road closures.

== Festival Op de Ring ==
On 21 June 2025, as part of celebrations marking the 750th anniversary of Amsterdam, approximately 15 kilometres (9.3 mi) of A10 West, South and East was closed to motor traffic for the Festival Op de Ring ("Festival on the Ring"). More than 200,000 people attended events on the motorway, including running, music, dance, sport, art and wedding ceremonies.

== Exit list ==
The entire route is in North Holland Province.

Municipality	km	mi	Exit	Destinations	Notes
Amsterdam	32– 0	20– 0.0	—	E22 / E35 / A 8	North end of E22 overlap; west end of E35 overlap
Amsterdam	28	17	—	A 5	Southbound entrance and northbound exit only
Amsterdam	28	17	1	S 101	
Amsterdam	27	17	2	S 102	
Amsterdam	26	16	3	N 200 / S 103	Northbound exit and southbound entrance only
Amsterdam	25	16	4	S 104	
Amsterdam	24	15	5	S 105	
Amsterdam	23	14	6	S 106	
Amsterdam	22	14	7	S 107	
Amsterdam	21	13	—	E19 / E22 / A 4	South end of E22 overlap; west end of E19 overlap
Amsterdam	20	12	8	S 108	
Amsterdam	18	11	9	S 109	
Amsterdam	16	9.9	10	E19 / E35 / A 2 / S 110	East end of E19 overlap; south end of E35 overlap
Amsterdam	15	9.3	11	S 111	
Ouder-Amstel	14	8.7	12	S 112	
Amsterdam	13	8.1	13	S 113	
Amsterdam	12	7.5	—	A 1	
Amsterdam	10	6.2	14	S 114	
Amsterdam	7	4.3	15	S 115	
Amsterdam	4	2.5	16	N 247 / S 116	
Amsterdam	2	1.2	17	S 117	
Amsterdam	1	0.62	18	S 118	
Amsterdam	0– 32	0.0– 20	—	E22 / E35 / A 8	West end of E35 overlap; north end of E22 overlap
1.000 mi = 1.609 km; 1.000 km = 0.621 mi: Concurrency terminus; Incomplete access

== See also ==
- Transport in Amsterdam
- Roads in the Netherlands
- List of motorways in the Netherlands
