= Provincial road N522 (Netherlands) =

Road in the Netherlands

Provincial highway 522
- Provinciale weg 522

Major junctions
- West end: Amstelveen
- East end: E35 / A 2 – Amsterdam-Zuidoost

Location
- Country: Kingdom of the Netherlands
- Constituent country: Netherlands
- Provinces: North Holland
- Municipalities: Ouder-Amstel, Amstelveen

Highway system
- Roads in the Netherlands; Motorways; E-roads; Provincial; City routes

Provincial road N522 is a Dutch provincial road.
