= Provincial road N401 (Netherlands) =

Road in the province of Utrecht, Netherlands

Provincial highway 401
- Provinciale weg 401
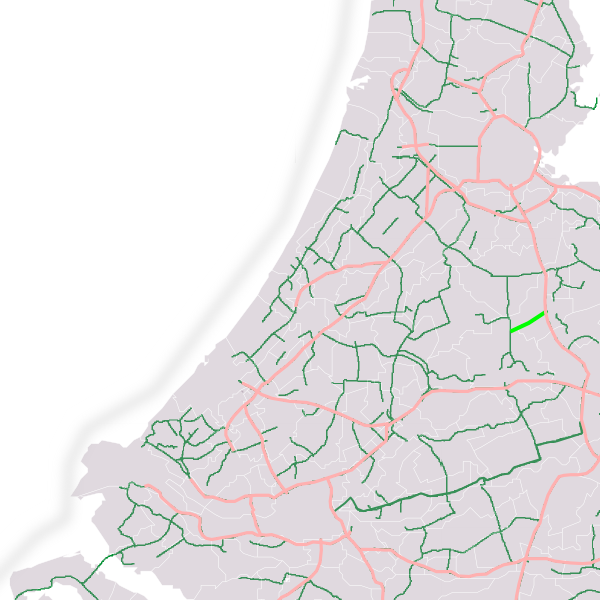

Major junctions
- West end: N 212
- East end: E35 / A 2 – Breukelen

Location
- Country: Kingdom of the Netherlands
- Constituent country: Netherlands
- Provinces: Utrecht
- Municipalities: Stichtse Vecht

Highway system
- Roads in the Netherlands; Motorways; E-roads; Provincial; City routes

Provincial road N401 is a Dutch provincial road in Utrecht. It connects the N212 at Oud-Kamerik with the A2 at Breukelen. In 2017, it was the first road in the Netherlands to be equipped with solar panels.
