= European route E231 =

Road in trans-European E-road network

E231

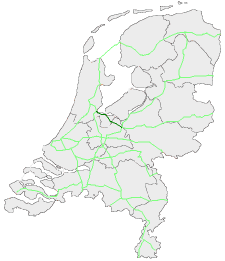
- European routes in the Netherlands with E 231 in dark green

Route information
- Maintained by Rijkswaterstaat

Major junctions
- West end: Amsterdam
- East end: Amersfoort

Location
- Countries: Netherlands

Highway system
- International E-road network; A Class; B Class

The E 231 is a European B class road in the Netherlands, connecting the cities of Amsterdam and Amersfoort.

The highway is maintained by Rijkswaterstaat.

== Route description ==
Netherlands

- E35 / A 10 in Amsterdam
- A 9 in Diemen
- A 6 in Muiderberg
- A 27 near Hilversum
- E30 / E232 / A 1 / A 28 in Amersfoort

== History ==
The route that E 231 follows was originally called E 35 in 1950 in the Declaration on the Construction of Main International Traffic Arteries. That route started in Amsterdam, passed by Amersfoort, E 231's current eastern terminus, Groningen and Bremen, and ended in Hamburg. In the 1950 version of that declaration, there were no routes numbered E 230 and E 231 yet. In 1975, E 230, a new route in the system, was defined and proposed as a road between Amsterdam and Amersfoort, the same route as it follows today. The 1975 version of E 231 followed today's E 232's route from Amersfoort to Groningen. E 35 was also laid down on a new course, running from Hook of Holland, passing by Rotterdam, Utrecht, Oberhausen, Cologne, and Basel, to Rome. These plans were put into force on 15 March 1983. In 1987, E 230, defined in 1975, was renumbered to E 231. E 231 was renumbered to E 232. E 35 was also rerouted again, now starting in Amsterdam, but following the same route once arrived in Utrecht.

In 1950, when E 35 was proposed, much of the underlying road wasn't constructed yet. The first part of the motorway to be completed was the Merwedebrug in 1933, now replaced with the Muiderbrug, with only one lane in each direction. Before 1942, construction started on embankments from Baarn to Amersfoort, but construction was discontinued due to World War II. In 1948 planning was continued and in 1952 Rijksweg 1, now also known as A1, was opened between Baarn and E 231's current eastern terminus Hoevelaken, which was merely a roundabout back then, compared to the cloverleaf interchange that is located there now. That part of the road had one lane in each direction and at grade intersections, but was already upgraded to have grade separated intersections in 1953.

== Exit list ==
Province	Municipality	km	mi	Exit	Name	Destinations	Notes
North Holland	Amsterdam	4.5	2.8	—	Watergraafsmeer Interchange	E35 / A 10 – Amsterdam, Rotterdam, Purmerend, Zaanstad	West end of A1 overlap
North Holland	Diemen	5.6	3.5	1	Diemen-Noord	Landlust / Diemerpolderweg / Vlinderweg	Westbound entrance and eastbound exit only
North Holland	Diemen	6.8	4.2	2	Diemen	S 114 (Weteringweg) / Diemerpolderweg – Diemen, Amsterdam-IJburg	
North Holland	Diemen	8.0	5.0	—	Diemen Interchange	A 9 south – Haarlem, Schiphol, Amsterdam-Zuidoost, Utrecht	
North Holland	Gooise Meren	11.2	7.0	3	Muiden	Paperlaan	
North Holland	Gooise Meren	15.6	9.7	—	Muiderberg Interchange	A 6 north – Lelystad, Almere	
North Holland	Gooise Meren	17.0	10.6	5	Naarden-West	Rijksweg / Churchillstraat	Westbound entrance and eastbound exit only
North Holland	Gooise Meren	18.3	11.4	6	Naarden-Vesting	IJsselmeerweg	
North Holland	Gooise Meren	22.6	14.0	7	Naarden	Amersfoortsestraatweg	
North Holland	Huizen	24.7	15.3	8	Blaricum	N 527 north (Crailoseweg) to N 526 east (Prins Hendriklaan) / Amersfoortsestraatweg / Rijksstraatweg – Blaricum, Huizen	
North Holland	Laren, North Holland	27.0	16.8	9	Hilversum-Noord	N 525 south (Hilversumseweg) / Hilversumseweg – Hilversum	
North Holland	Laren, North Holland	28.6	17.8	9a	De Witte Bergen	Rijksweg / Heidelaan	
Utrecht	Eemnes	29.6	18.4	—	Eemnes Interchange	A 27 – Hilversum, Utrecht, Almere	
Utrecht	Eemnes	31.0	19.3	10	Soest, Netherlands	N 221 south / Zandheuvelweg / Wakkerendijk – Soest, Netherlands, Baarn	
Utrecht	Baarn	34.1	21.2	11	Eembrugge	N 414 (Bisschopsweg) – Eembrugge, Baarn	
Utrecht	Amersfoort	39.0	24.2	12	Bunschoten-Spakenburg	N 199 (Bunschoterstraat / Amersfoortsweg) – Bunschoten-Spakenburg, Amersfoort	
Utrecht	Amersfoort	42.0	26.1	13	Amersfoort-Noord	Bergpas / Rondweg Oost	
Utrecht	Amersfoort	44.6	27.7	—	Hoevelaken Interchange	E30 / E232 north / A 1 east / A 28 – Utrecht, Zwolle, Apeldoorn, Arnhem	East end of A1 overlap
1.000 mi = 1.609 km; 1.000 km = 0.621 mi: Concurrency terminus; Incomplete access
