= Provincial road N812 (Netherlands) =

Road in the Netherlands

Provincial highway 812
- Provinciale weg 812
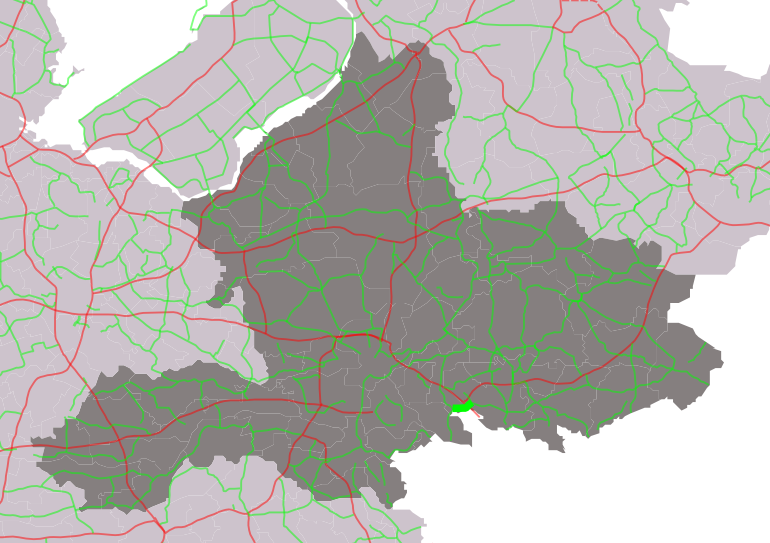

Major junctions
- West end: N 336 – Babberich

- East end: N 335

Location
- Country: Kingdom of the Netherlands
- Constituent country: Netherlands
- Provinces: Gelderland

Highway system
- Roads in the Netherlands; Motorways; E-roads; Provincial; City routes

Provincial road N812 is a Dutch provincial road in Gelderland. It runs from Babberich to Beek along the border with Germany.
