= A1 motorway (Netherlands) =

Highway in the Netherlands

A1 motorway
- Rijksweg 1
- Location of the A1 motorway

Route information
- Part of E30 / E231
- Maintained by Rijkswaterstaat
- Length: 119 km (74 mi)

Major junctions
- West end: A 10 in Amsterdam
- A 9 in Diemen; A 6 near Muiderberg; A 27 near Eemnes; E30 / E231 / E232 / A 28 in Amersfoort; A 30 near Barneveld; A 50 in Apeldoorn; A 35 near Borne
- East end: A 30 near Losser at the border with Germany

Location
- Country: Kingdom of the Netherlands
- Constituent country: Netherlands
- Provinces: North Holland, Utrecht, Gelderland, Overijssel

Highway system
- Roads in the Netherlands; Motorways; E-roads; Provincial; City routes

The A1 is a motorway in the Netherlands. The road connects the capital city of Amsterdam, near the interchange of Watergraafsmeer, with the German border, near Oldenzaal and Bad Bentheim, and the German Autobahn BAB 30. On its way, it crosses four provinces: North Holland, Utrecht, Gelderland and Overijssel.

== European routes ==
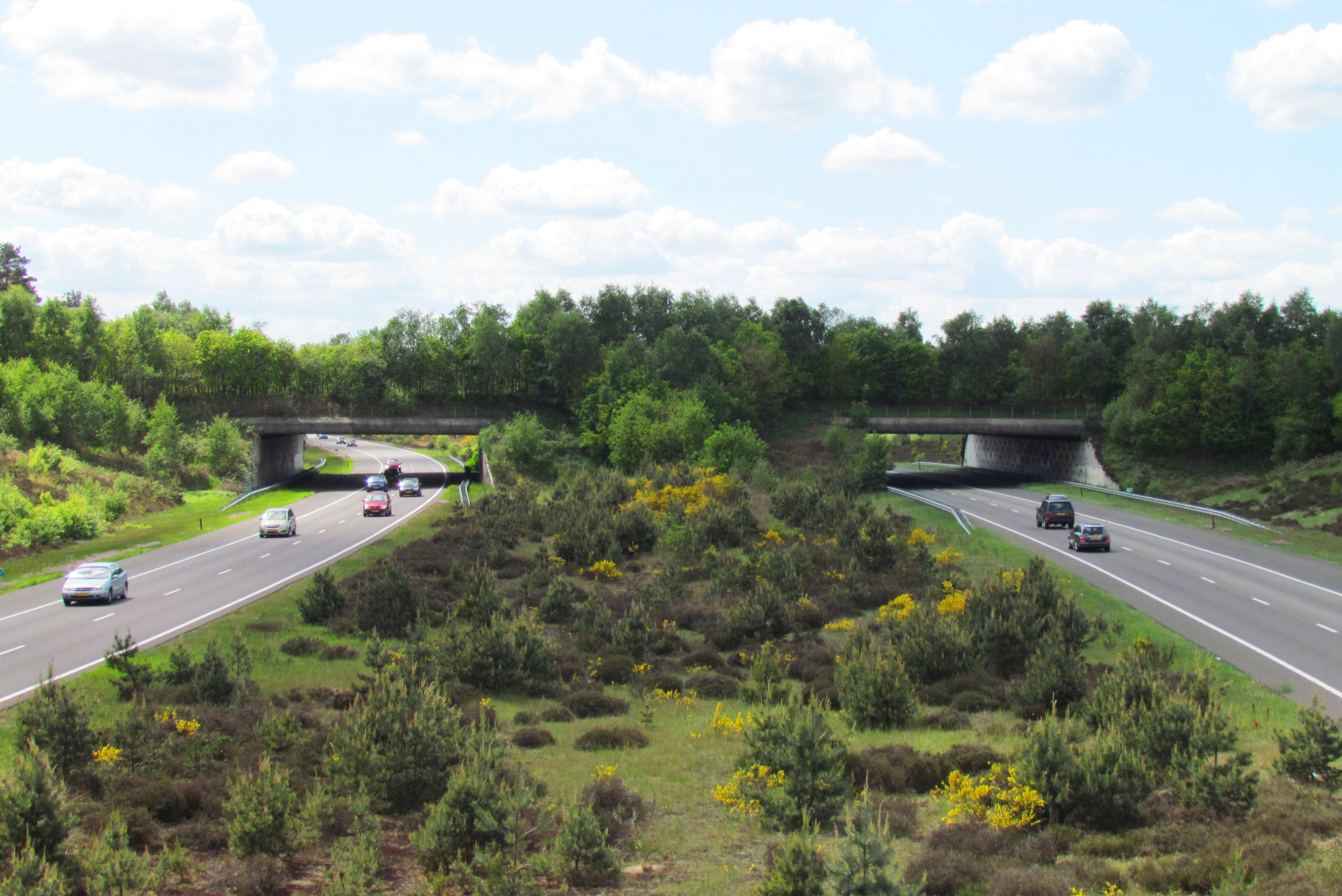
Ecoduct Harm van de Veen

The section of the road between its start at the interchange Watergraafsmeer, and the interchange of Hoevelaken near Amersfoort, is also a European route: the E231. This section of the A1 is the complete E231 route; the E231 does not consist of any other road or section.

Between the interchange Hoevelaken and the German border (and beyond, along the BAB 30), the European route E30 follows the A1 motorway. This European route is a so-called A-Class West-East European route, going from Cork in Ireland all the way to Omsk in Russia.

== Exit list ==
Country	Province	Municipality	km	mi	Exit	Destinations	Notes
Netherlands	North Holland	Amsterdam - Diemen municipality line			—	E35 / E231 east / A 10	West end of E 231 overlap
Netherlands	North Holland	Diemen			1	Landlust / Diemerpolderweg	Westbound entrance and eastbound exit only
Netherlands	North Holland	Diemen			2	S 114 southeast / Weteringweg	
Netherlands	North Holland	Diemen			—	A 9 south	
Netherlands	North Holland	Muiden			3	Maxisweg / Mariahoeveweg / Weesperweg	
Netherlands	North Holland	Muiden			—	A 6 northeast	
Netherlands	North Holland	Naarden			5	Rijksweg / Churchillstraat	Westbound entrance and eastbound exit only
Netherlands	North Holland	Naarden			6	IJsselmeerweg	
Netherlands	North Holland	Naarden			7	Amersfoortsestraatweg	
Netherlands	North Holland	Huizen - Laren - Hilversum municipality line			8	N 527 north / Amersfoortsestraatweg / Rijksstraatweg	
Netherlands	North Holland	Laren			9	N 525 southwest / Hilversumseweg	
Netherlands	North Holland - Utrecht province Line	Laren - Eemnes - Baarn municipality line			10	A 27 / N 221 southeast / Heidelaan / Rijksweg / Wakkerendijk / Zandheuvelweg	
Netherlands	Utrecht	Baarn			11	N 414	
Netherlands	Utrecht	Bunschoten - Amersfoort municipality line			12	N 199	
Netherlands	Utrecht	Amersfoort			13	Bergpas / Rondweg Oost	
Netherlands	Utrecht	Amersfoort			—	E231 / E30 / A 28	East end of E 231 overlap; west end of E 30 overlap
Netherlands	Utrecht	Amersfoort			14	Amersfoortsestraat / Westerdorpsstraat / Nijkerkerstraat	Eastbound exit accessible only from A28 northbound
Netherlands	Gelderland	Barneveld			15	A 30 / N 301	
Netherlands	Gelderland	Barneveld			16	N 303 / N 805	
Netherlands	Gelderland	Barneveld			17	N 310	
Netherlands	Gelderland	Apeldoorn			18	N 302	
Netherlands	Gelderland	Apeldoorn			19	N 304	
Netherlands	Gelderland	Apeldoorn			20	Kayersdijk	
Netherlands	Gelderland	Apeldoorn			—	A 50	
Netherlands	Gelderland	Apeldoorn			21	N 345	
Netherlands	Gelderland	Voorst			22	N 791	
Netherlands	Overijssel	Deventer			23	N 348	
Netherlands	Overijssel	Deventer			24	N 348	
Netherlands	Overijssel	Deventer			25	Marsdijk / Baarhorsterdijk	
Netherlands	Overijssel	Rijssen-Holten			26	N 332	
Netherlands	Overijssel	Rijssen-Holten			27	N 350 / N 755	
Netherlands	Overijssel	Wierden			28	N 347	
Netherlands	Overijssel	Borne			—	A 35	West end of A35 overlap
Netherlands	Overijssel	Borne			29	Kluft	
Netherlands	Overijssel	Borne			—	A 35	East end of A35 overlap
Netherlands	Overijssel	Hengelo			30	Rondweg / Bornestraat	
Netherlands	Overijssel	Hengelo			31	Oldenzaalsestraat / Hasselerbaan	
Netherlands	Overijssel	Oldenzaal			32	Provinciale rondweg	
Netherlands	Overijssel	Oldenzaal			33	N 733	
Netherlands	Overijssel	Losser			34	N 735	
Netherlands - Germany country line	Overijssel - North Rine-Westphalia province line	Losser - Gronau municipality line			—	E30 / A 30	East end of E 30 overlap
1.000 mi = 1.609 km; 1.000 km = 0.621 mi: Concurrency terminus; Incomplete access; Unopened
