= S115 (Amsterdam) =

City route in Amsterdam, the Netherlands

City route 115
- Stadsroute 115

Major junctions
- East end: E35 / A 10 – Amsterdam
- West end: S 116 – Amsterdam

Location
- Country: Kingdom of the Netherlands
- Constituent country: Netherlands
- Provinces: North Holland
- Municipalities: Amsterdam

Highway system
- Roads in the Netherlands; Motorways; E-roads; Provincial; City routes

S115 is a Dutch city route in Amsterdam. It is a 2 mile motorway through Kadoelen. It connects exit 15 of the A10 with the S116.
