= Provincial road N247 (Netherlands) =

Road in the Netherlands

Provincial highway 247
- Provinciale weg 247

Major junctions
- South end: E35 / A 10 / S 116 – Amsterdam

- North end: E22 / A 7 / N 243 – Hoorn

Location
- Country: Kingdom of the Netherlands
- Constituent country: Netherlands
- Provinces: North Holland

Highway system
- Roads in the Netherlands; Motorways; E-roads; Provincial; City routes

Provincial road N247 is a Dutch provincial road.
