= S118 (Amsterdam) =

City route in Amsterdam, Netherlands

City route 118
- Stadsroute 118

Major junctions
- North end: E22 / A 8 / N 516 / S 150 – Oostzaan

- South end: S 116 – Amsterdam

Location
- Country: Kingdom of the Netherlands
- Constituent country: Netherlands
- Provinces: North Holland
- Municipalities: Oostzaan, Amsterdam

Highway system
- Roads in the Netherlands; Motorways; E-roads; Provincial; City routes

S118 is a Dutch city route in Amsterdam. It runs 4.4 miles from exit 18 of the A10 motorway through Amsterdam-Noord to the S116, leading to the IJtunnel.
