= Odijk =

- Town
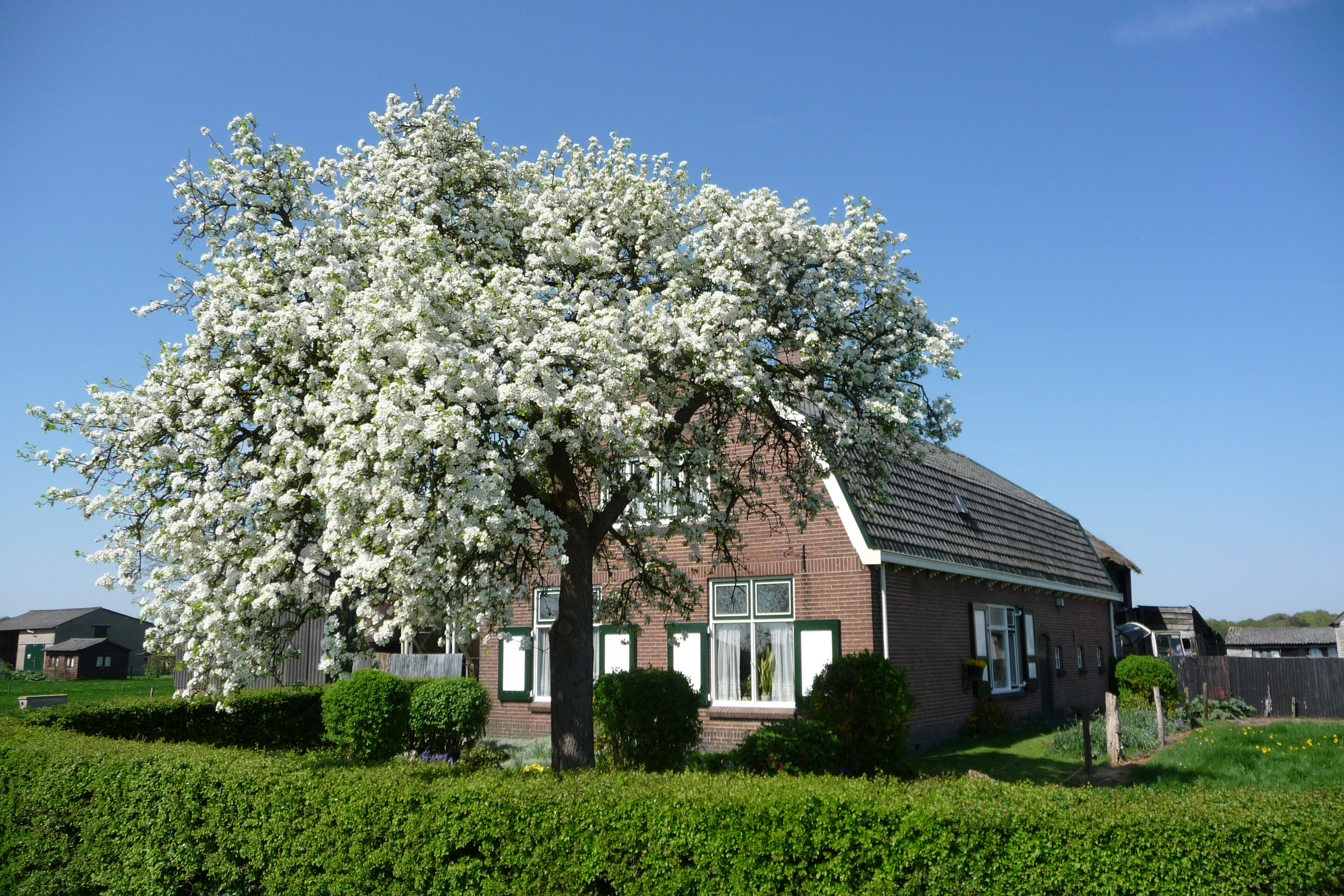
- Farm with apple tree in full blossom

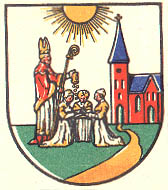
- Coat of arms

- Location in the Netherlands Odijk (Netherlands)
- Coordinates: 52°3′01″N 5°14′0″E
- Country: Netherlands
- Province: Utrecht
- Municipality: Bunnik

Area
  - Total: 7.18 km^{2} (2.77 sq mi)
- Elevation: 4 m (13 ft)

Population (2021)
  - Total: 5,720
  - Density: 797/km^{2} (2,060/sq mi)
- Time zone: UTC+1 (CET)
  - Summer (DST): UTC+2 (CEST)
- Postal code: 3984
- Dialing code: 030

Odijk is a town in the Dutch province of Utrecht. It is a part of the municipality of Bunnik, and lies about 4 km (2 mi) south of Zeist.

Odijk used to be a separate municipality. It merged with Bunnik and Werkhoven in 1964.

== Overview ==
The village was first mentioned between 918 and 948 as Iodichem. The etymology is unclear. Odijk developed as an esdorp along the Kromme Rijn. In the 13th century, it became an independent parish. The church and tower were demolished in 1820, because the building was in a bad shape, and a new church was built. In 1840, it was home to 411 people.

Odijk has three primary schools, two churches and many locations for sports activities, such as football, tennis and indoor sports.

== Gallery ==
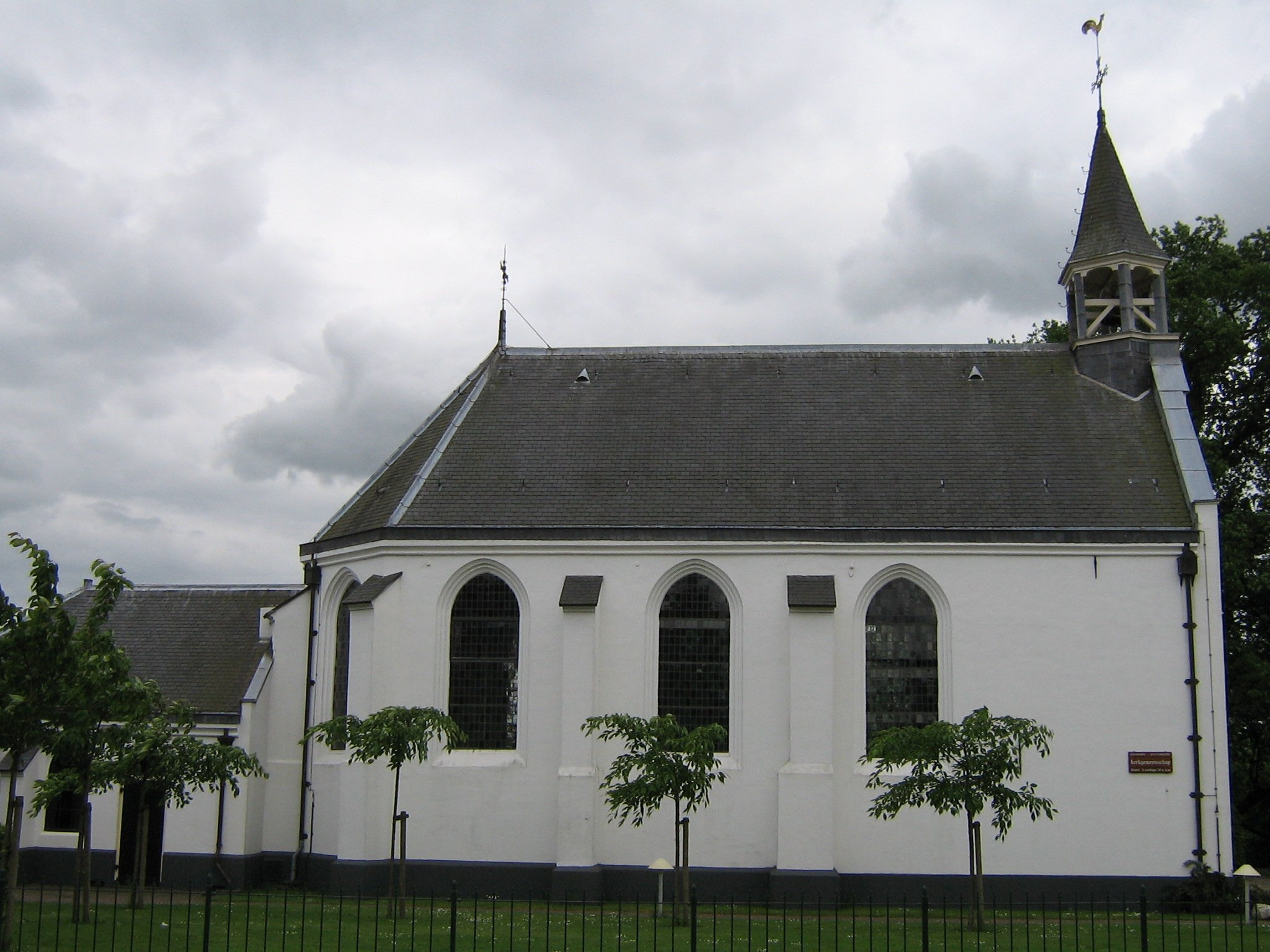
Church in Odijk

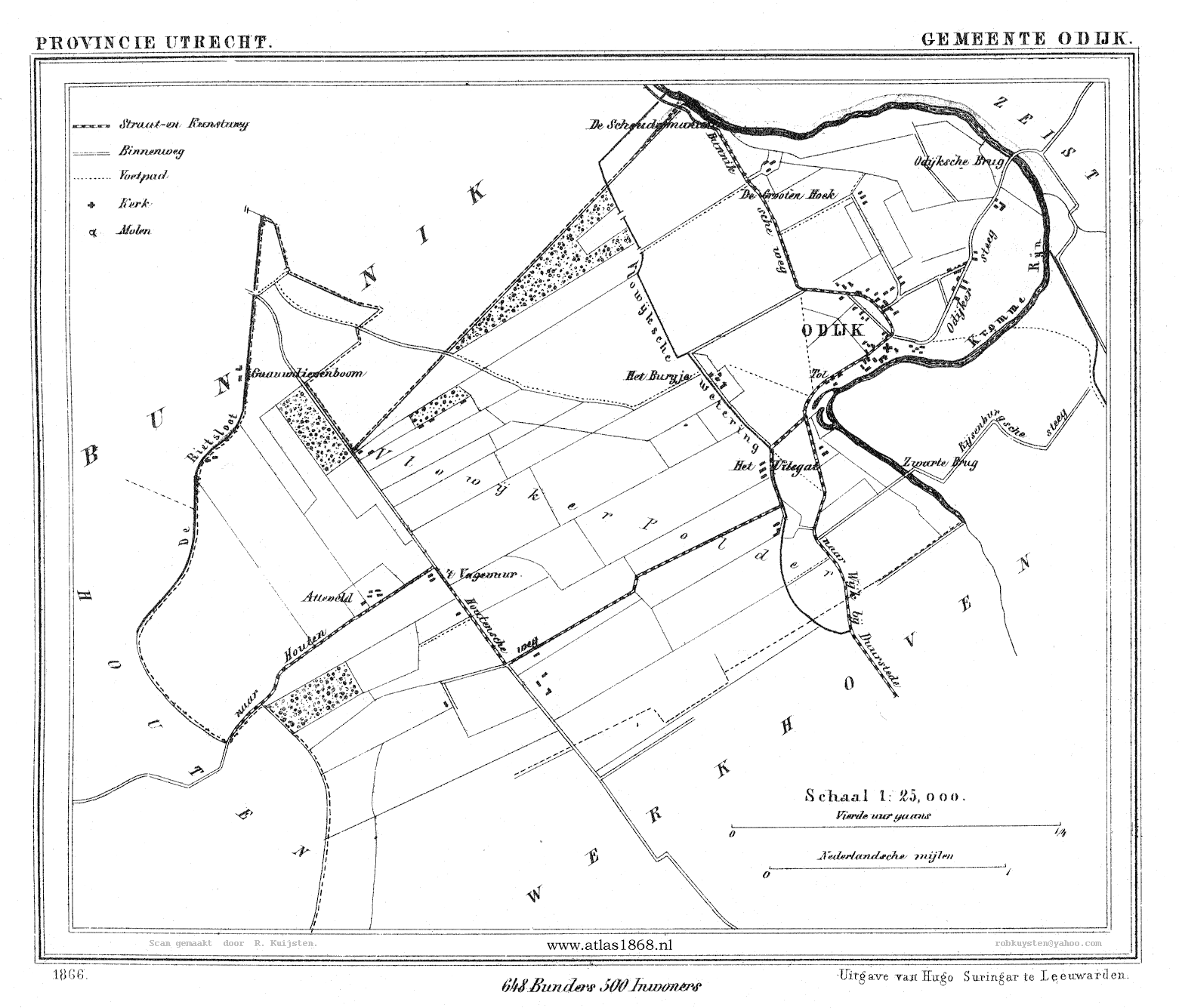
Map of Odijk in 1866

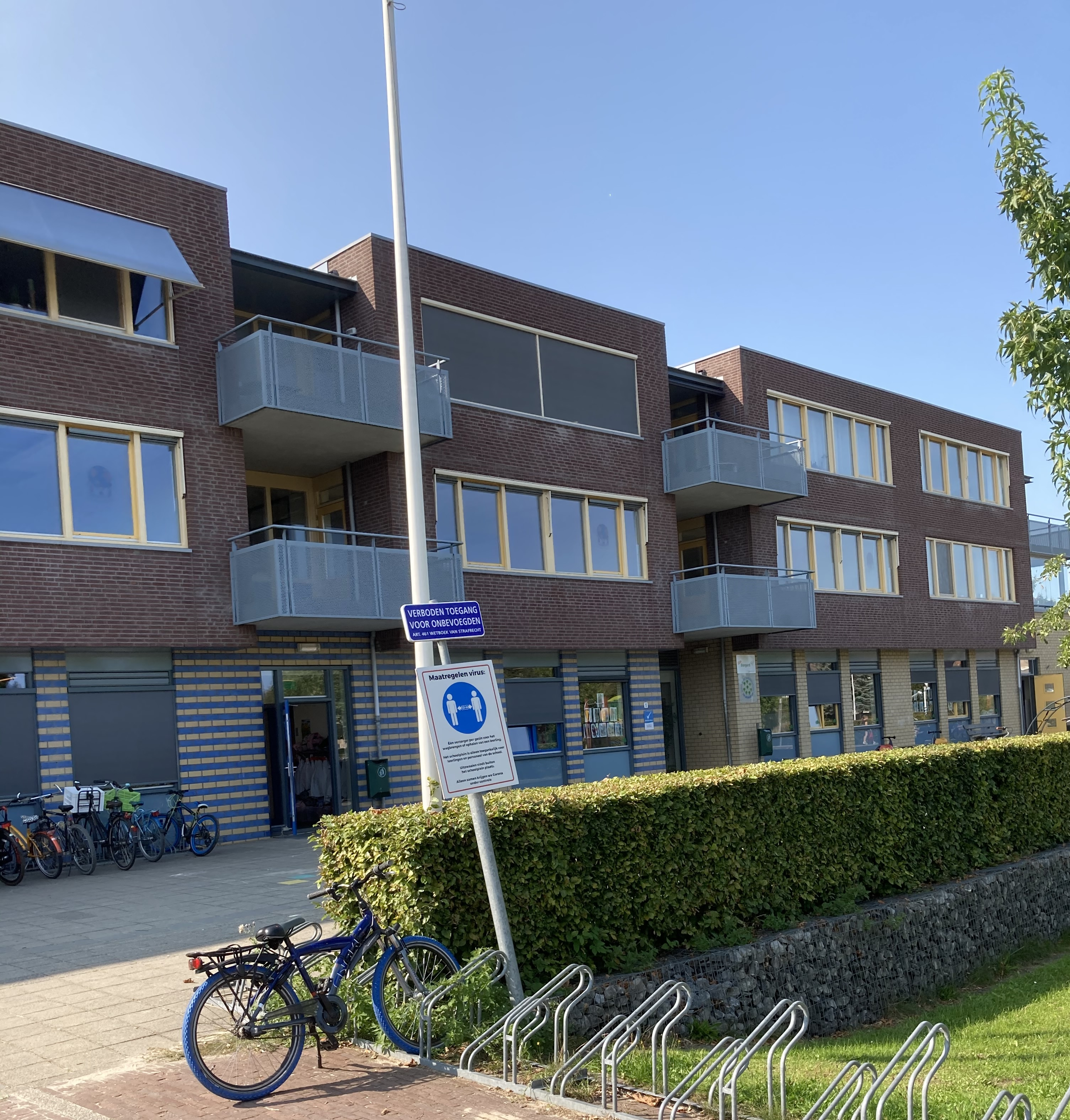
School in Odijk

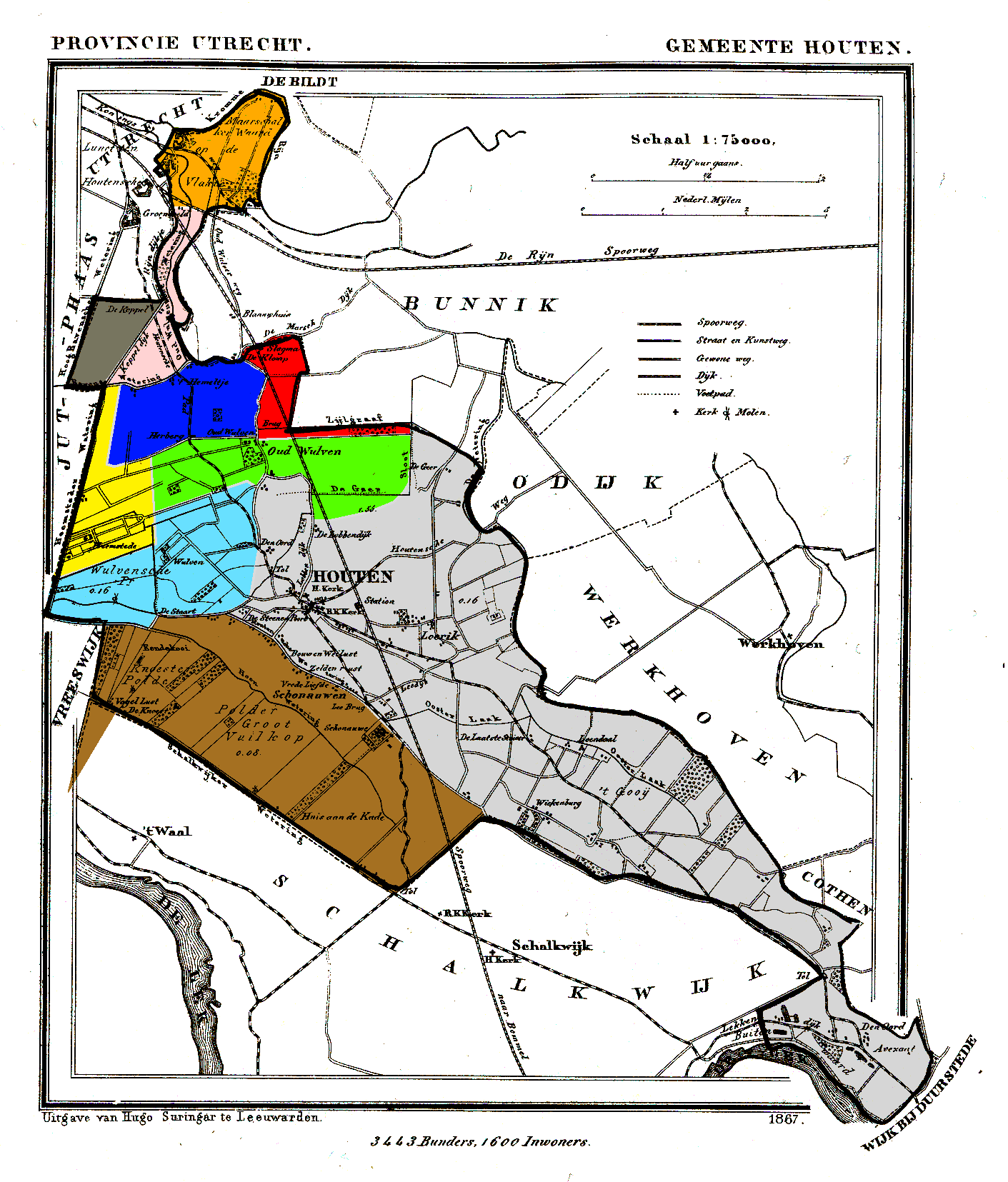
Houten in 1868. The heerlijkheden before 1795 are shown: Oud-Wulven (green), Waaijen (blue), Wulven (light blue), Heemstede (yellow), Grote and Kleine Koppel (pink and dark grey), Maarschalkerweerd (orange), and Slagmaat (red), and Odijk to the Northeast.
