= Bunnik =

Municipality in Utrecht, Netherlands

- Municipality
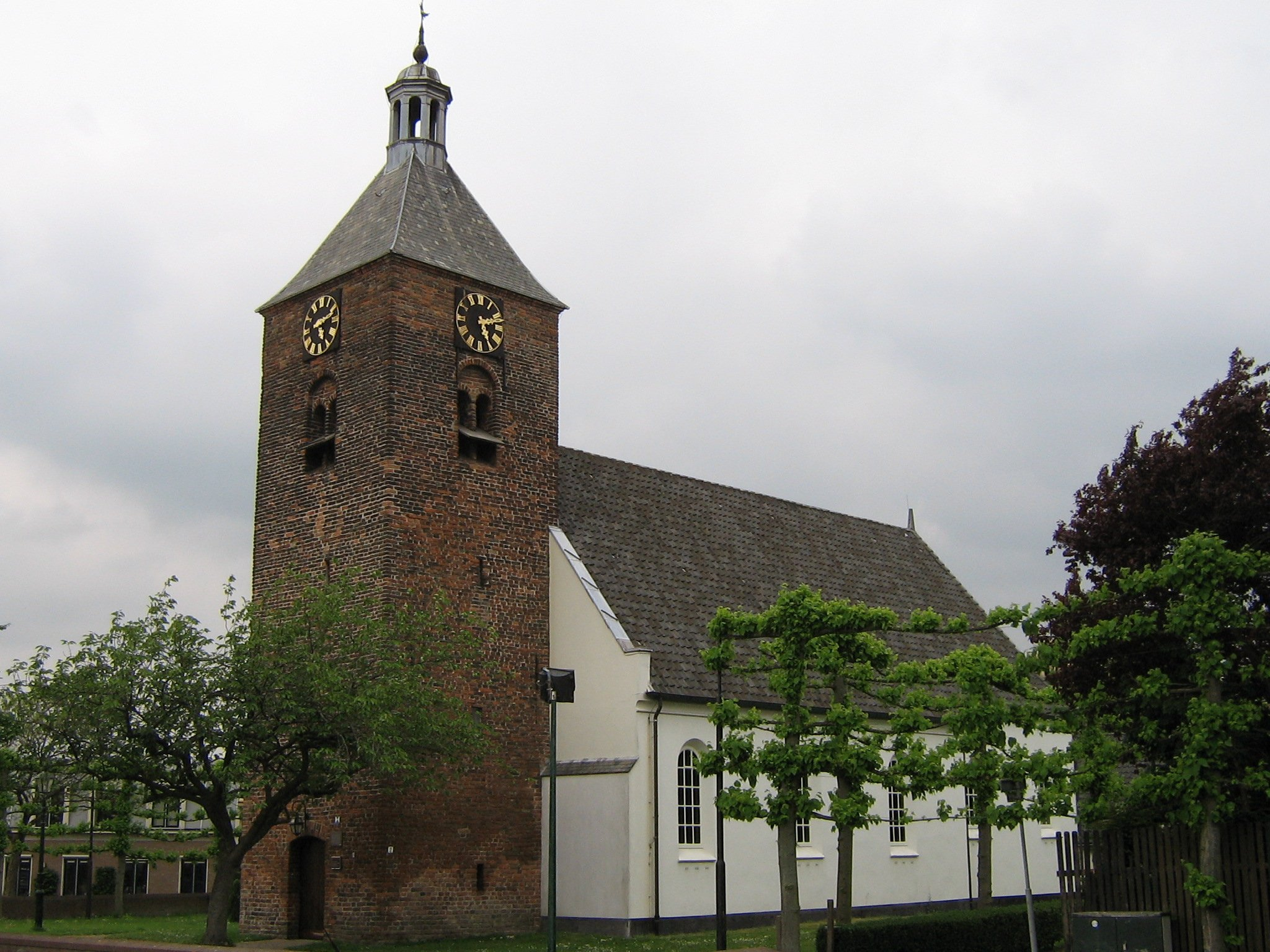
- Reformed Church in Bunnik

- Flag Coat of arms

- Location in Utrecht
- Coordinates: 52°3′N 5°14′E
- Country: Netherlands
- Province: Utrecht

Government
  - Body: Municipal council
  - Mayor: Ruud van Bennekom (PvdA)

Area
  - Total: 37.57 km^{2} (14.51 sq mi)
  - Land: 36.97 km^{2} (14.27 sq mi)
  - Water: 0.60 km^{2} (0.23 sq mi)
- Elevation: 3 m (9.8 ft)

Population (January 2021)
  - Total: 15,341
  - Density: 415/km^{2} (1,070/sq mi)
- Demonym: Bunniker(s)
- Time zone: UTC+1 (CET)
  - Summer (DST): UTC+2 (CEST)
- Postcode: 3980–3985
- Area code: 030
- Website: bunnik.nl

Bunnik (Dutch pronunciation: [ˈbʏnɪk]) is a municipality and village in the province of Utrecht, Netherlands. The recorded history of the village dates back nearly 2000 years, when the Romans constructed a fort at Fectio (now Vechten) with a harbour facing the river Rhine, which marked the border of the Roman Empire. The fort developed into a thriving trading centre, which continued to exist after the Romans abandoned the fort in the fourth century. Subsequently, the area was occupied by the Frisians and the Franks. In the 8th and 9th century, the villages of Bunninchem (Bunnik), Lodichem (Odijk) and Wercundia (Werkhoven) developed.

Bunnik is of interest for its surrounding nature area, consisting mainly of forests and farmlands. Additionally, Bunnik, hosts the oldest Youth Hostel in the Netherlands. The major European construction and services company Royal BAM Group has its headquarters in Bunnik.

== Population centres ==
The municipality of Bunnik contains the small towns and villages of Bunnik, Odijk, Werkhoven.

=== Topography ===
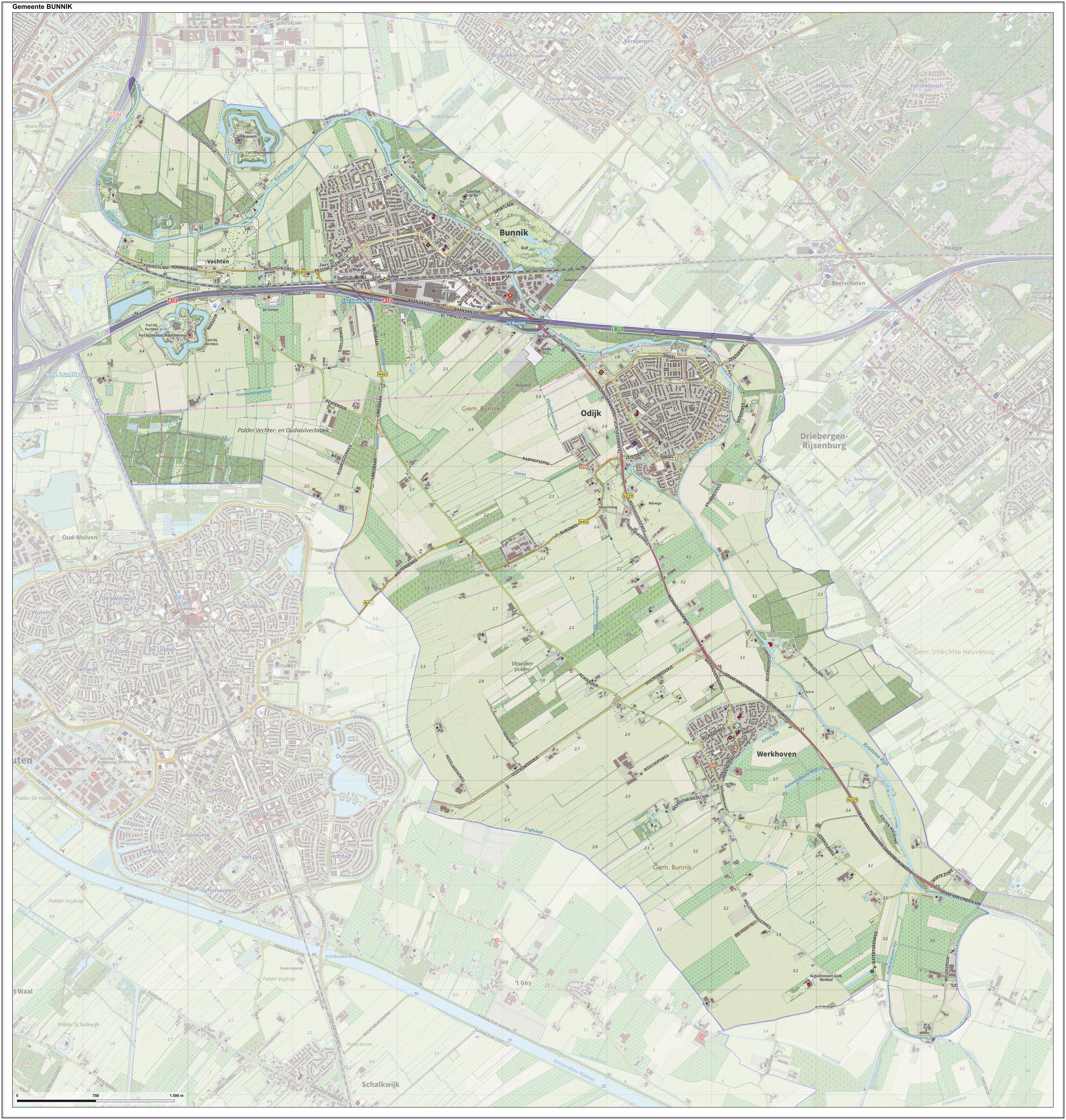

Map of the municipality of Bunnik, June 2015.

== Transportation ==
- Bunnik railway station

== Notable people ==
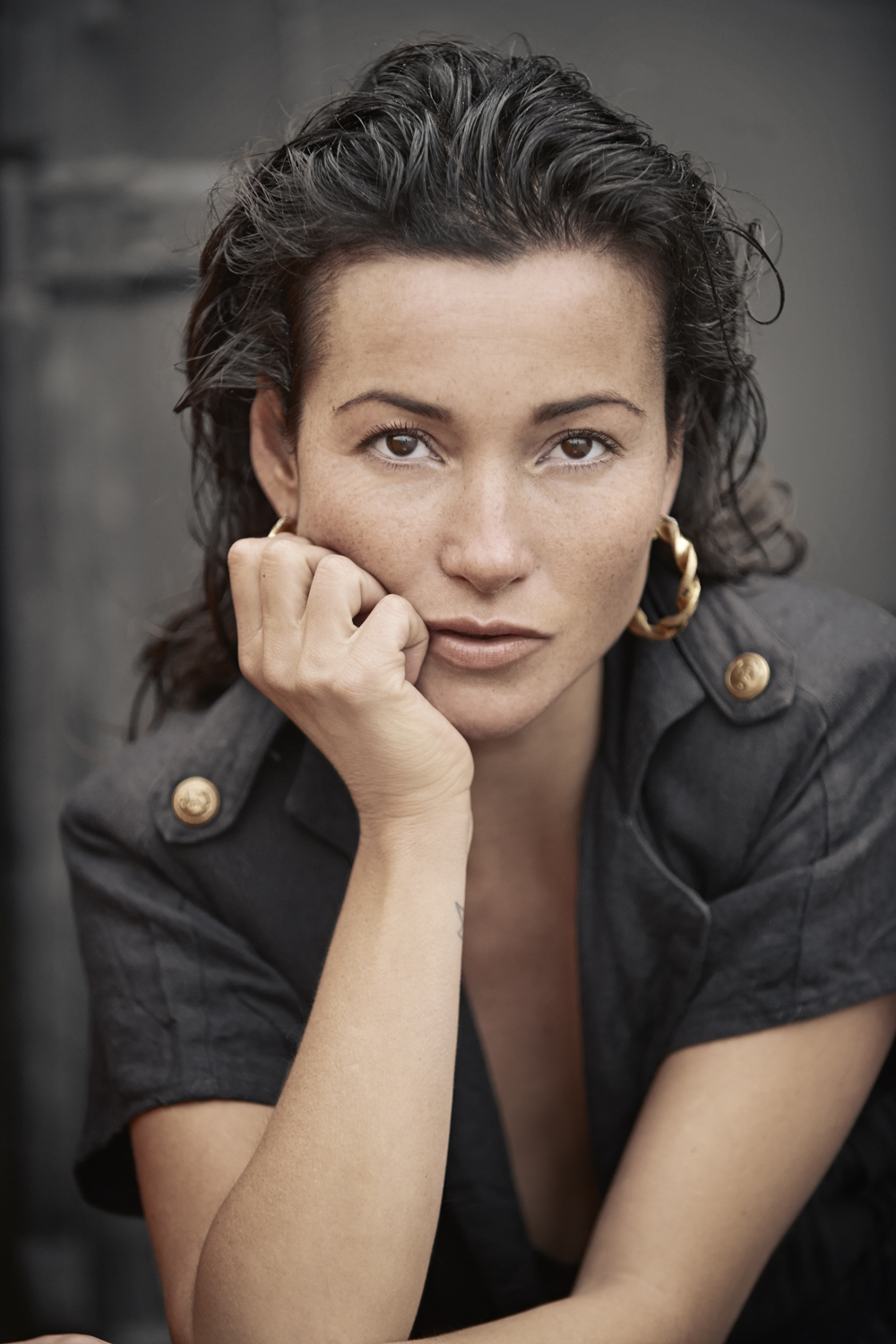
Birgit Schuurman, 2016

- Thea Beckman (1923 – 2004 in Bunnik), author of children's books
- Jacob Pieter van Braam (1737 in Werkhoven – 1803) an admiral
- Andreas Everardus van Braam Houckgeest (1739 in Werkhoven – 1801) a Dutch-American merchant in China
- John Oostrom (1930 in Werkhoven – 2023) the first Dutch-born Canadian parliamentarian
- Coby van Baalen (born 1957 in Werkhoven) an equestrian, team silver medallist at the 2000 Summer Olympics
- Katja Schuurman (born 1975 in Bunnik) an actress, singer and TV personality
- Birgit Schuurman (born 1977) a singer and actress, brought up in Bunnik
- Jaap Stockmann (born 1984 in Bunnik) a retired field hockey goalkeeper who played for the Dutch national team
- Jan Welmers (1937 – 2022 in Bunnik), composer and organist

== Gallery ==
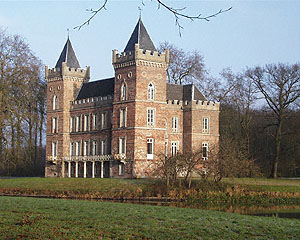
Kasteel Beverweerd

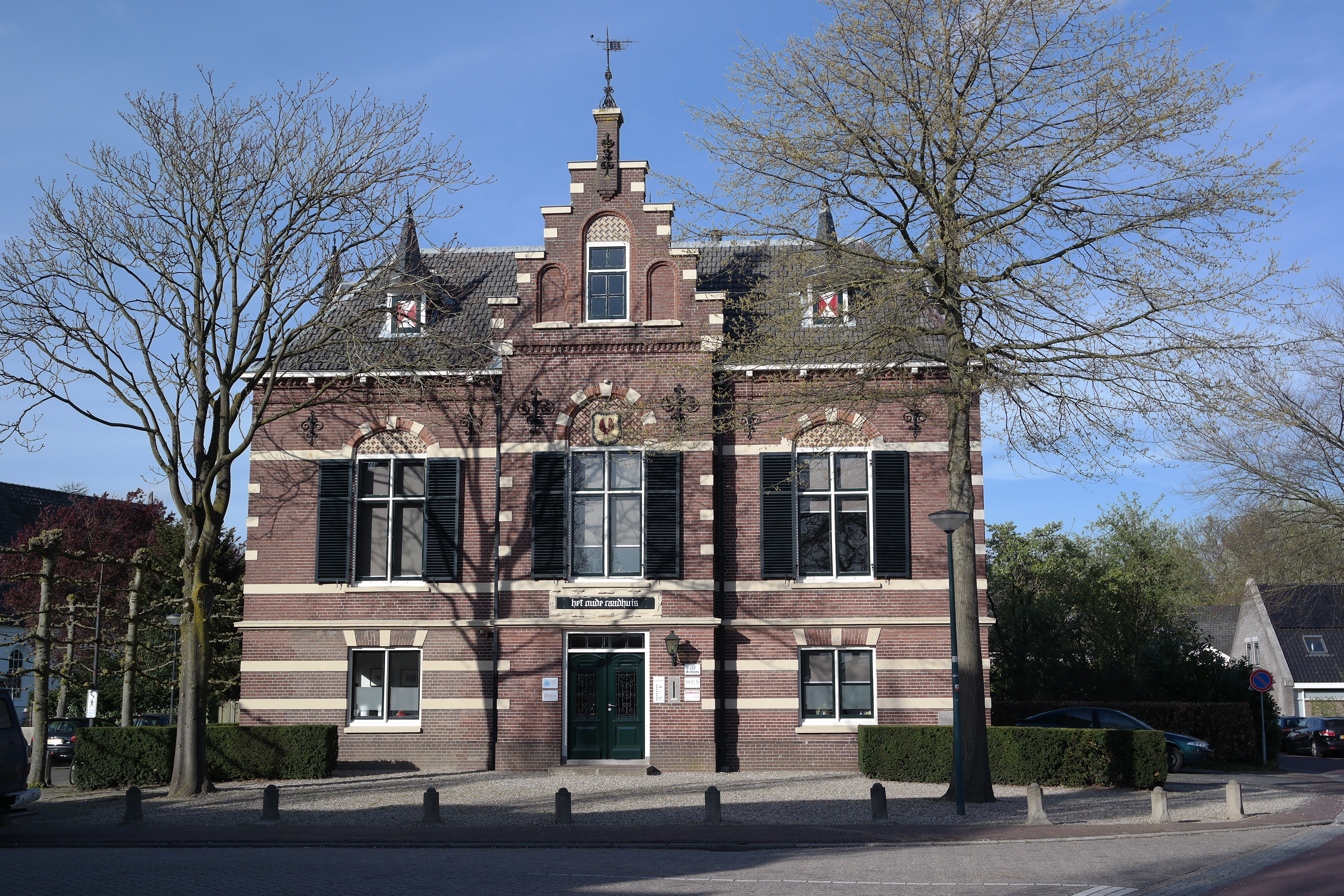
Former Bunnik Town Hall

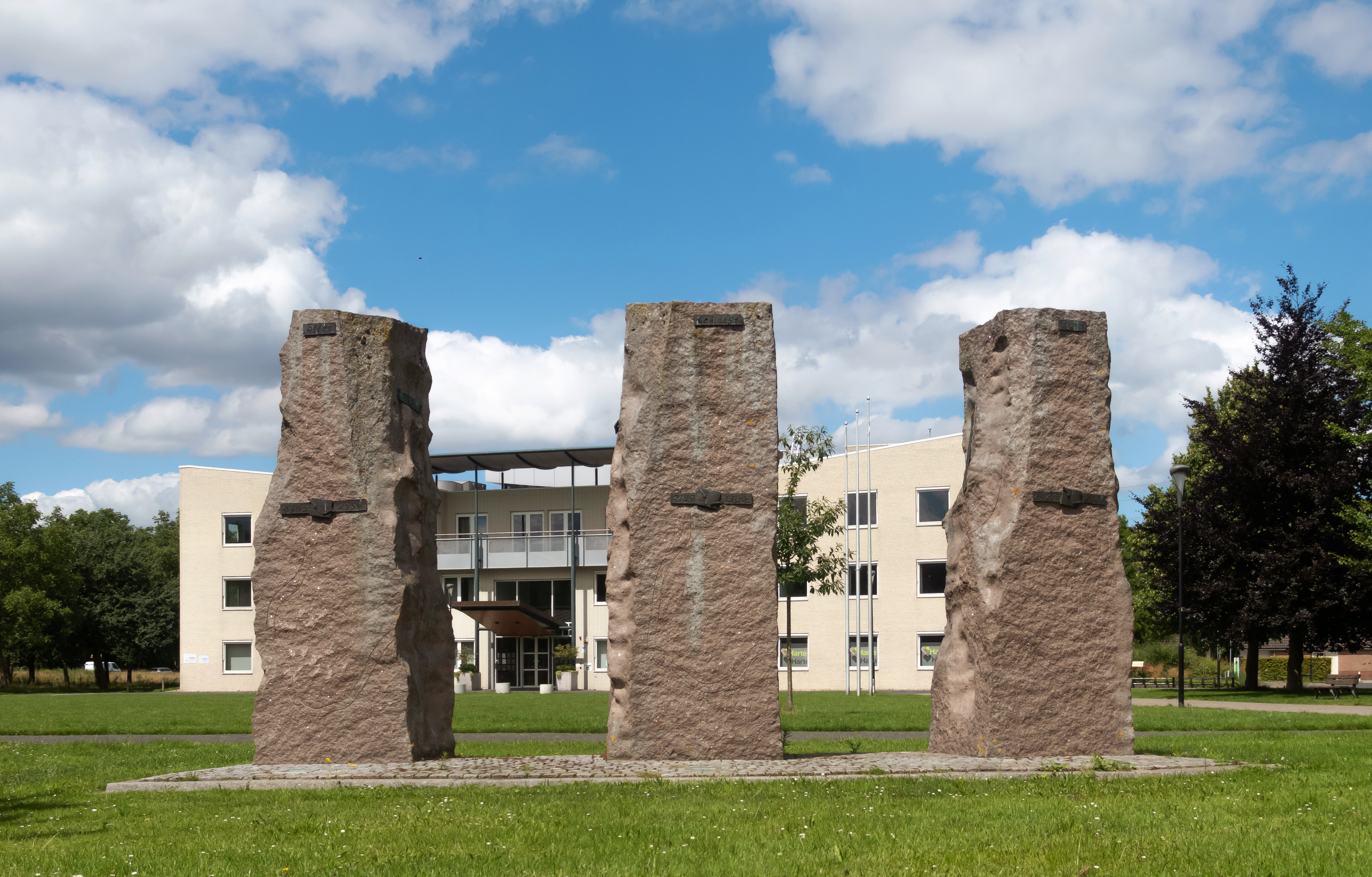
Odijk, art work (Three Stones) near the townhall designed by Hans Leutscher

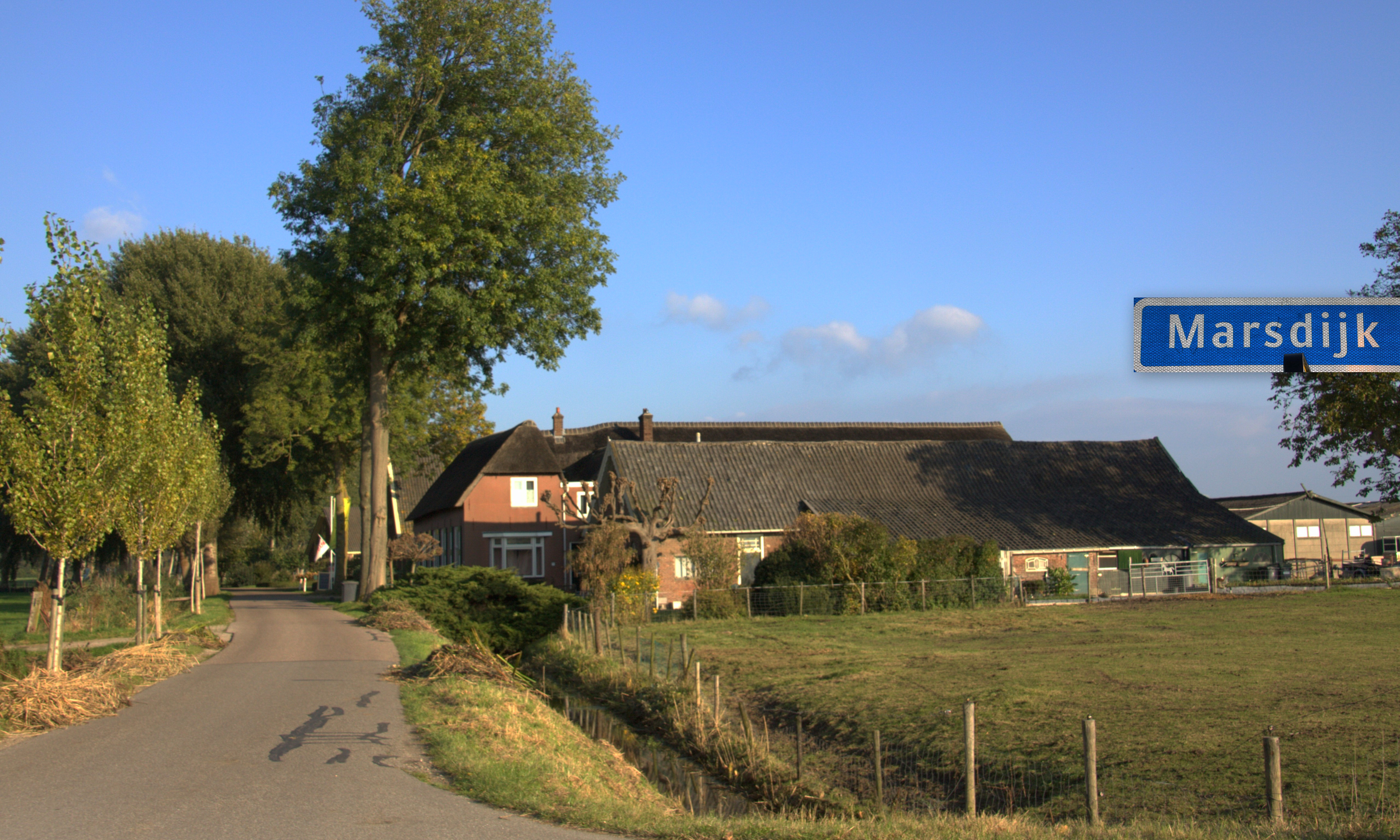
Marsdijk Bunnik seen from the Mereveldseweg

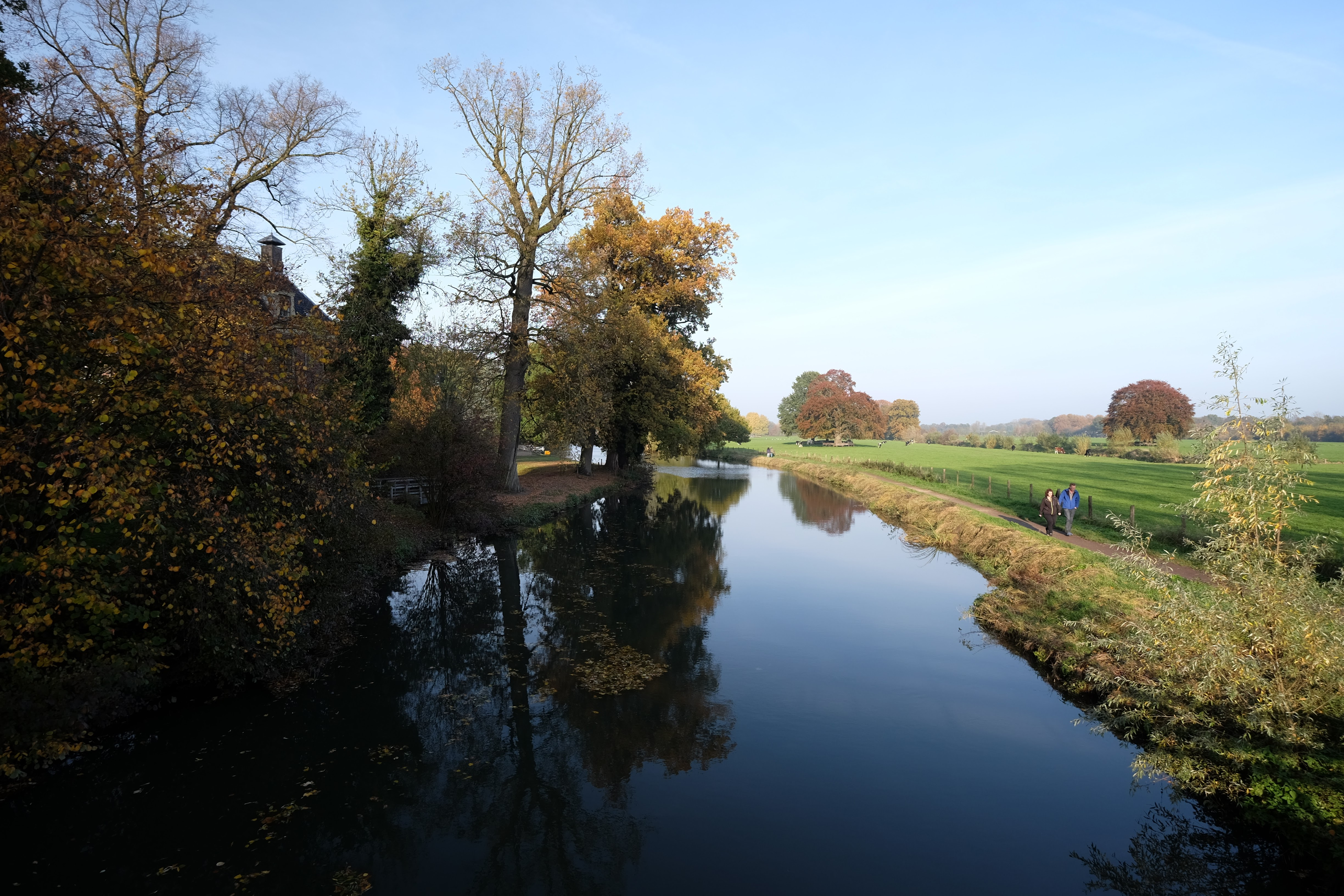
Bunnik, panorama
