= S116 (Amsterdam) =

City route in Amsterdam, the Netherlands

City route 116
- Stadsroute 116

Major junctions
- North end: E35 / A 10 / N 247 – Amsterdam

- South end: S 100 – Amsterdam

Location
- Country: Kingdom of the Netherlands
- Constituent country: Netherlands
- Provinces: North Holland
- Municipalities: Amsterdam

Highway system
- Roads in the Netherlands; Motorways; E-roads; Provincial; City routes

S116 is a Dutch city route in Amsterdam. It runs northbound from the city centre through the IJtunnel to exit 16 of the A10.
