= Babberich =

- Village
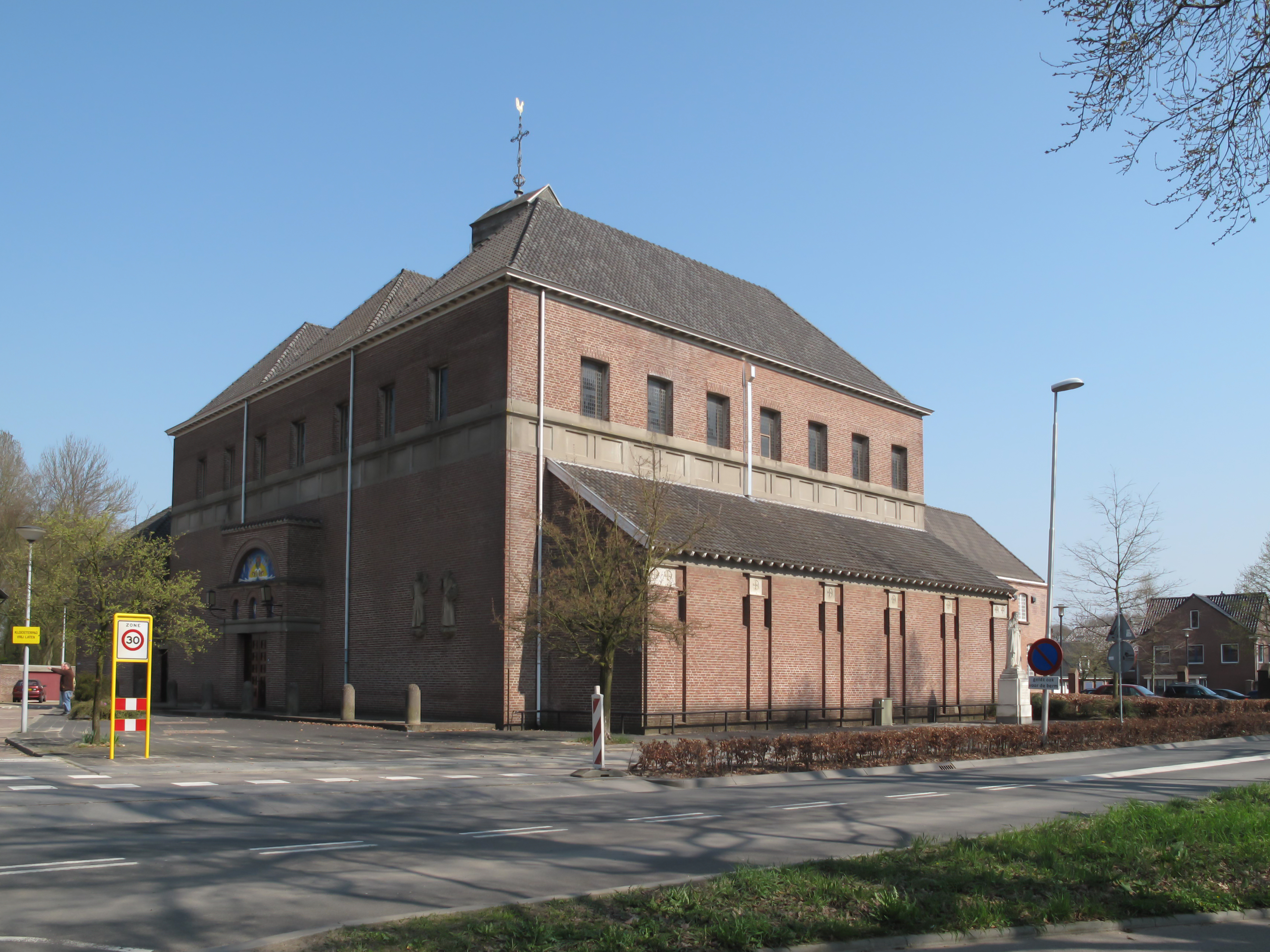
- Church of Babberich

- Location in the Netherlands Babberich (Netherlands)
- Coordinates: 51°54′22″N 6°6′40″E
- Country: Netherlands
- Province: Gelderland
- Municipality: Zevenaar

Area
  - Total: 8.26 km^{2} (3.19 sq mi)
- Elevation: 13 m (43 ft)

Population (2021)
  - Total: 2,235
  - Density: 271/km^{2} (701/sq mi)
- Time zone: UTC+1 (CET)
  - Summer (DST): UTC+2 (CEST)
- Postal code: 6909
- Dialing code: 0316

Babberich is a village in the Dutch province of Gelderland. It is in the municipality Zevenaar, about 3 km southeast of the centre of Zevenaar. It's located near the border with Germany. Until 1816, it was a part of the Duchy of Cleves.

== History ==
The village was first mentioned between 1357 and 1358 Babborch. The etymology is not clear. Huis Babberich has been recorded as early as 1363. In 1786, the current manor house was built. In 1816, Babberich became part of the Netherlands. In 1840, it was home to 1,144 people.

== Sports and music ==
The atmospheric rock band Crescent Moon is based here.

The football team SV Babberich is based here.

== Gallery ==
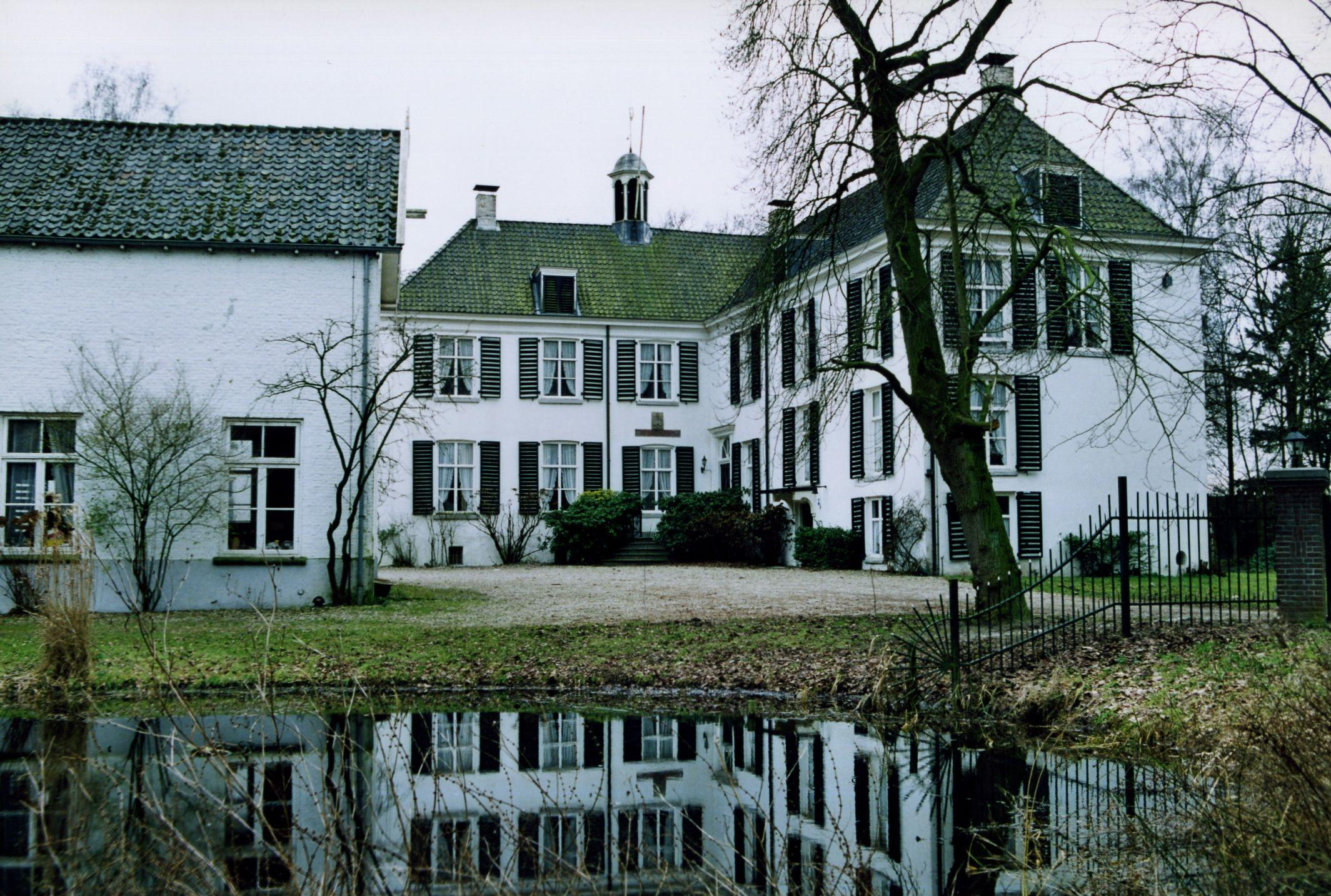
Huize Babberich

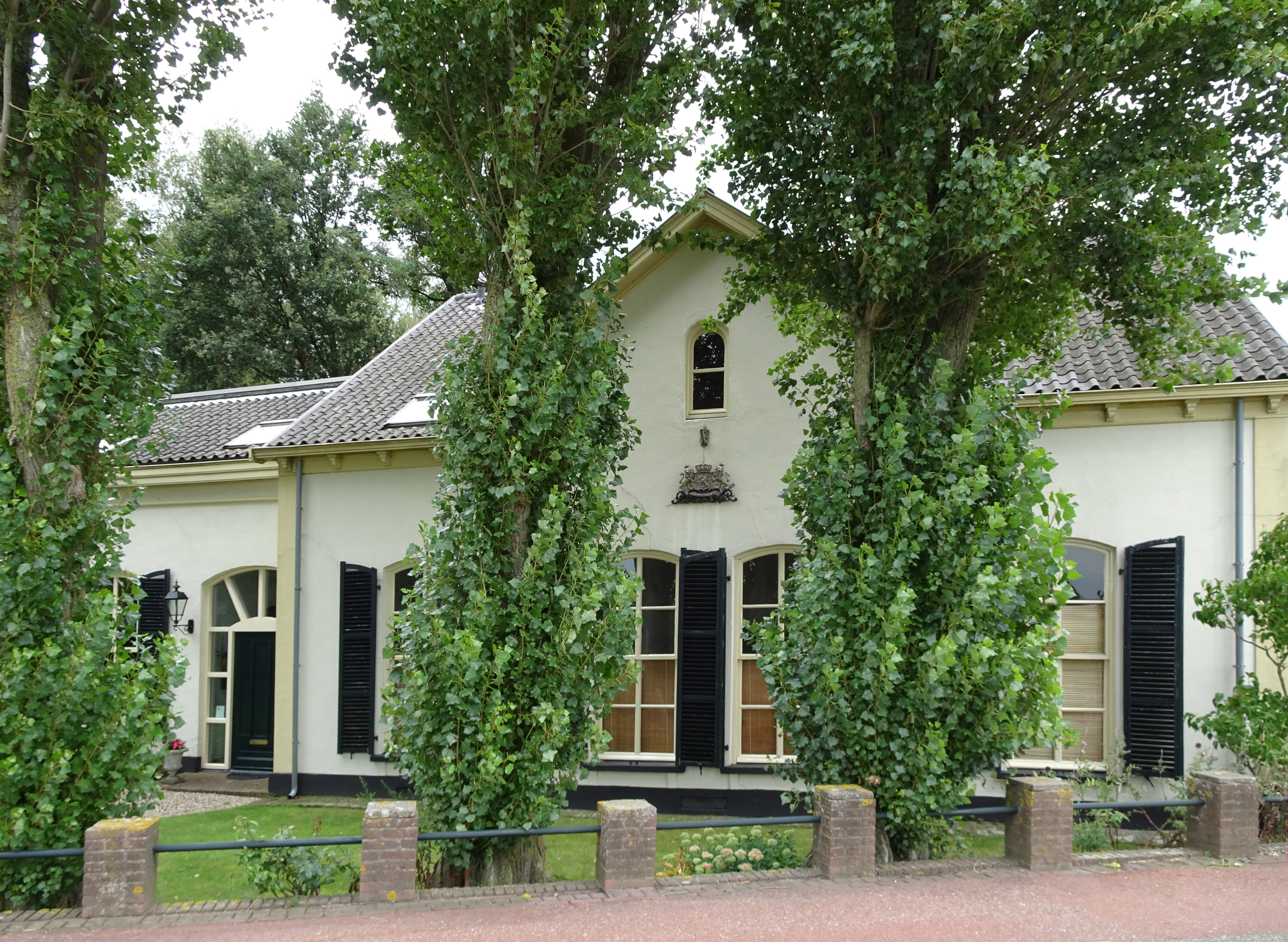
Former customs house

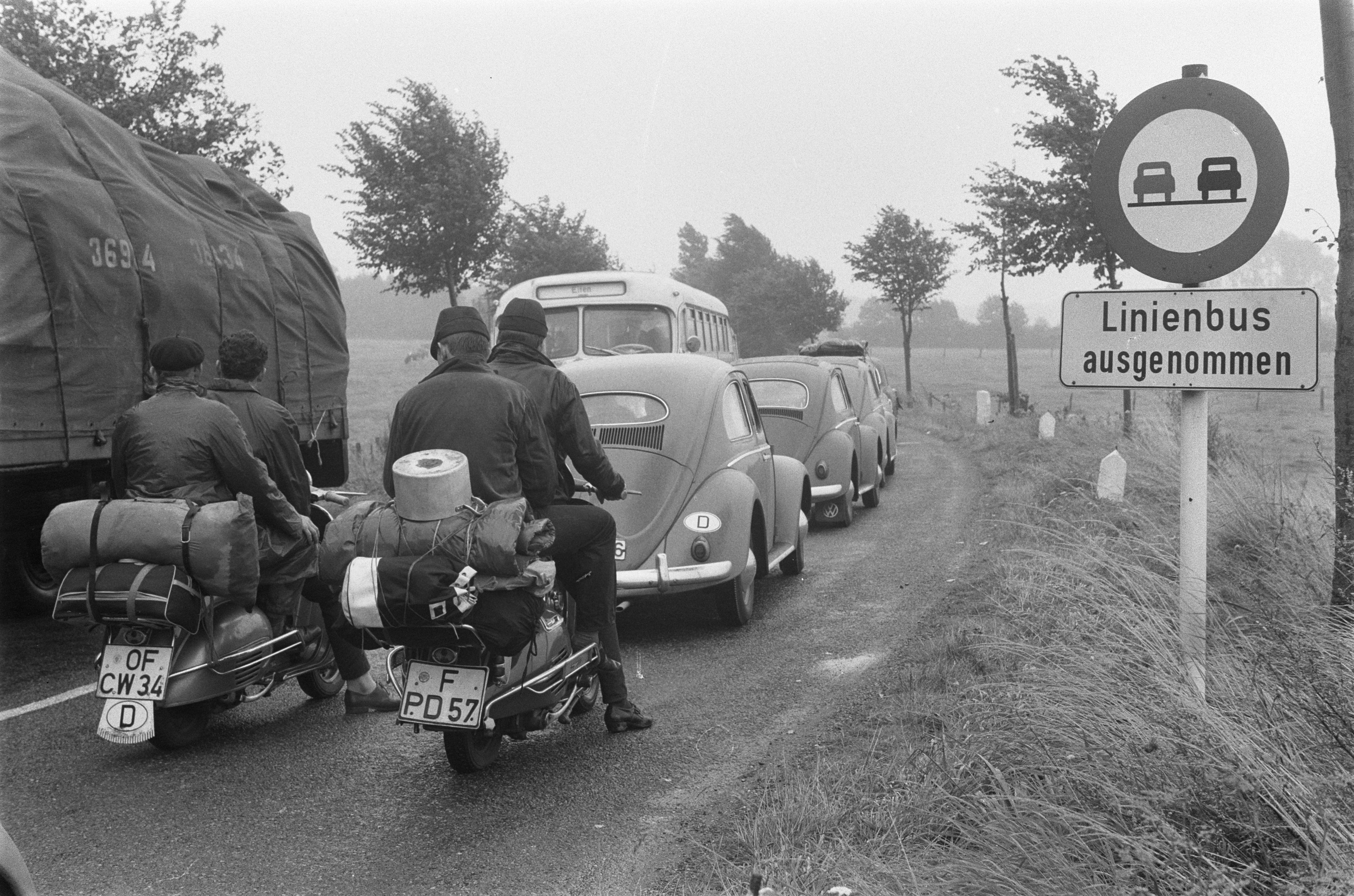
Holiday traffic jam towards to Dutch border (August 1961)

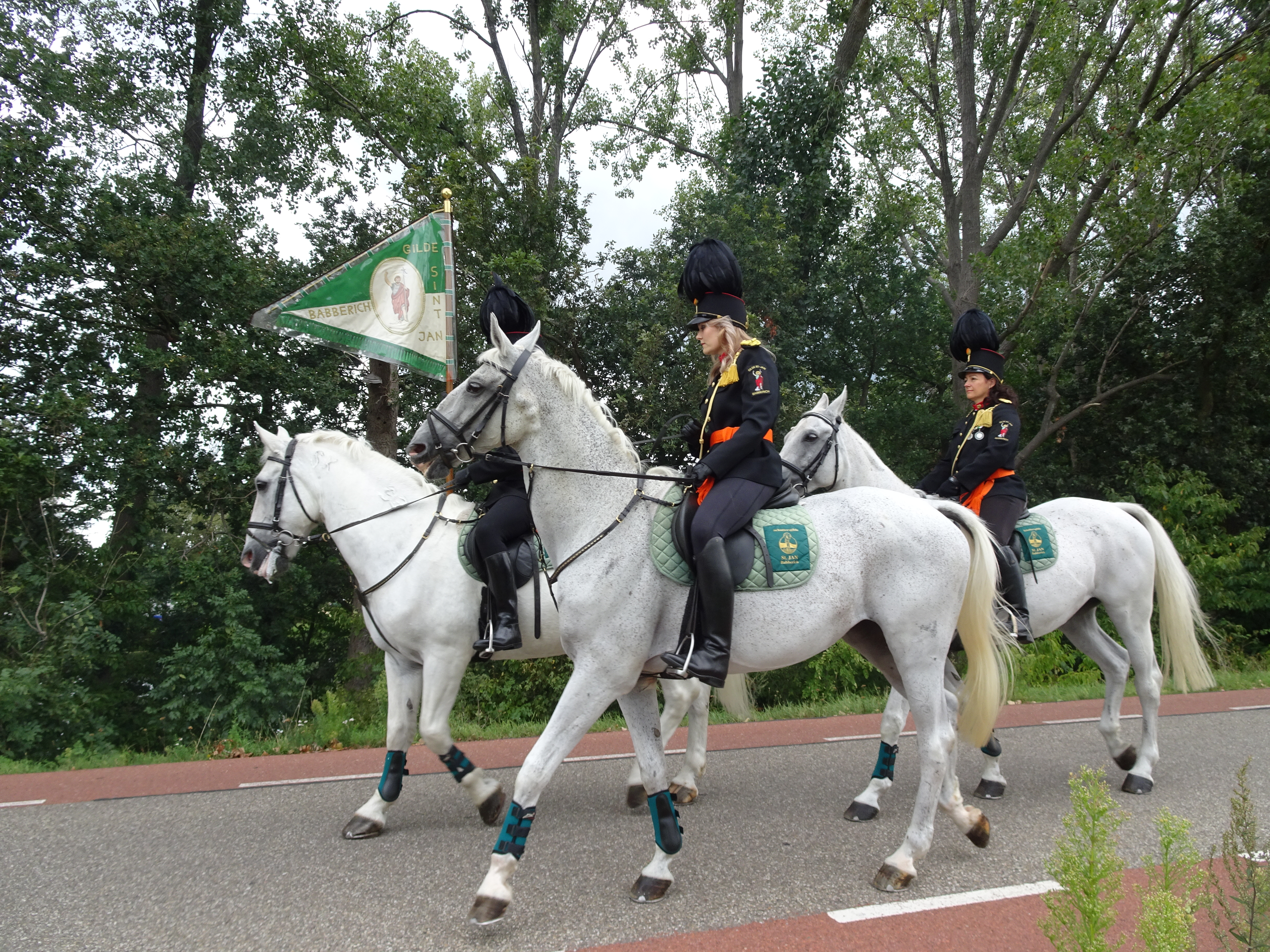
Parade of schutterij St. Jan
