= S114 (Amsterdam) =

City route in Amsterdam, the Netherlands

City route 114
- Stadsroute 114

Major junctions
- West end: S 100 – Amsterdam

- East end: E231 / A 1 – Diemen

Location
- Country: Kingdom of the Netherlands
- Constituent country: Netherlands
- Provinces: North Holland
- Municipalities: Amsterdam, Diemen

Highway system
- Roads in the Netherlands; Motorways; E-roads; Provincial; City routes

S114 is a city route in Amsterdam, Netherlands. It is the main connection for IJburg with the city center and Diemen. The route starts at the A1 at Diemen, crosses the Amsterdam-Rhine canal at Uyllander Bridge and the IJmeer at Benno Premsela Bridge. It leaves IJburg at Enneüs Heerma Bridge, crosses Zeeburgereiland and through the Piet Hein Tunnel connects with the S100 inner circle route.
