= Provincial road N224 (Netherlands) =

Road in the Netherlands

Provincial highway 224
- Provinciale weg 224
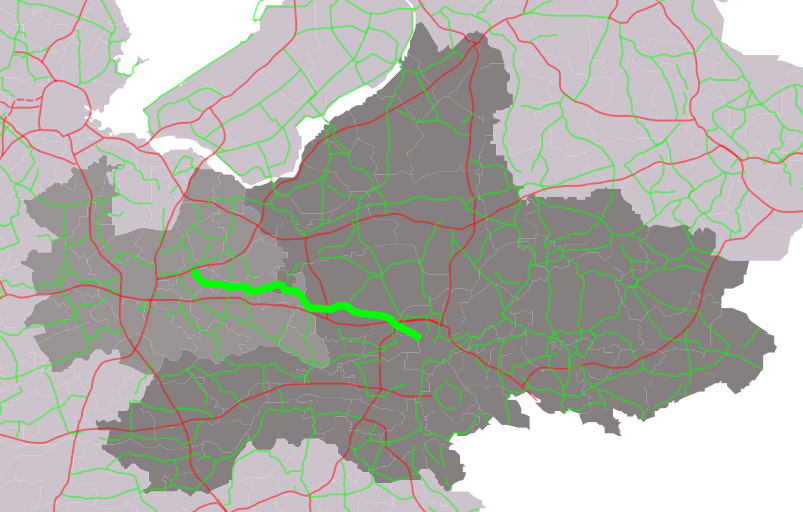

Major junctions
- West end: Zeist
- East end: Arnhem

Location
- Country: Kingdom of the Netherlands
- Constituent country: Netherlands
- Provinces: Utrecht, Gelderland

Highway system
- Roads in the Netherlands; Motorways; E-roads; Provincial; City routes

Provincial road N224 is a Dutch provincial road in Utrecht and Gelderland. It runs from Zeist to Ede and Arnhem.
