= European route E311 =

Road in trans-European E-road network

E311

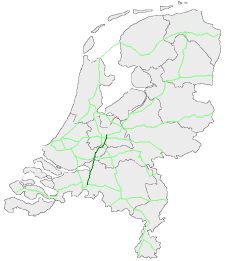
- European routes in the Netherlands with E311 in dark green

Major junctions
- From: Utrecht (Netherlands)
- To: Ginneken en Bavel (Netherlands)

Location
- Countries: Netherlands

Highway system
- International E-road network; A Class; B Class

E 311 is a European B class road in Netherlands, connecting the cities of Utrecht and Breda.

- Netherlands
  - Utrecht
  - Breda (Ginneken en Bavel)

== Highway connections ==
The E 311 has a total length of 99.3 kilometres, and serves as the connector between the E 30 and the E 19 (E 312). From north to south the following highways share junctions with the E 311:

- E30 (Highways 12 and 27) - Lunetten (Utrecht)
- E35 (Highway 12) - Lunetten
- E25 (Highway 2) - Everdingen
- E31 (Highway 15) - Gorinchem
- N97 (Highway 59) - Hooipolder
- E312 (Highway 58) - Sint Annabosch

The entire route is constructed as a motorway and is part of Highway 27 (Rijksweg A27).

Before the renumbering of the E-roads in the 1980s, this route was known as the E 37.
