= Diemerpark =

Park in Amsterdam, Netherlands

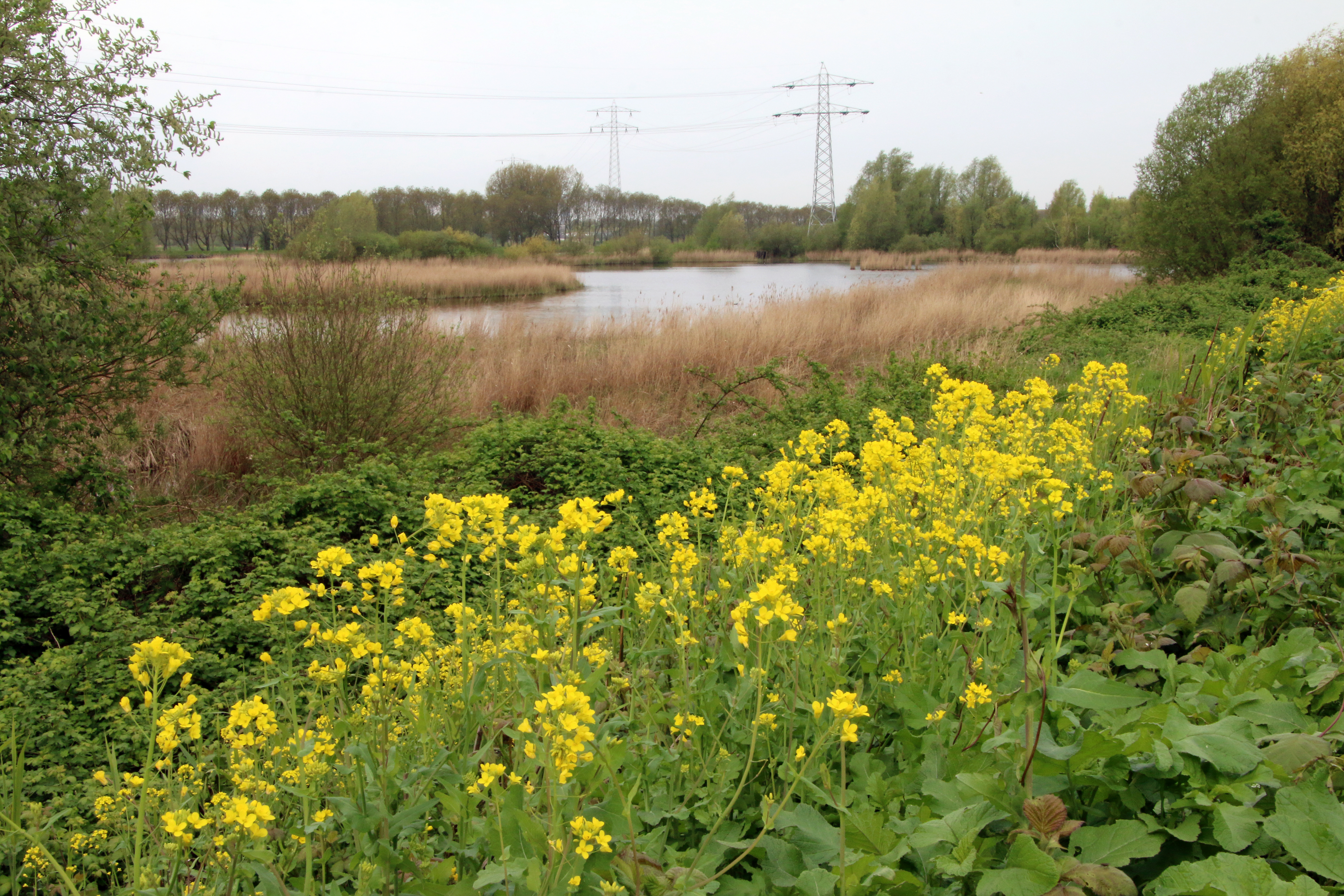
- The Diemerpark, Akkerswade
- Interactive map of Diemerpark
- Type: Urban park
- Location: Amsterdam, Netherlands
- Coordinates: 52°21′09″N 4°59′13″E
- Area: 90 ha (220 acres)
- Created: 2004
- Operator: Amsterdam-Oost
- Status: Open all year

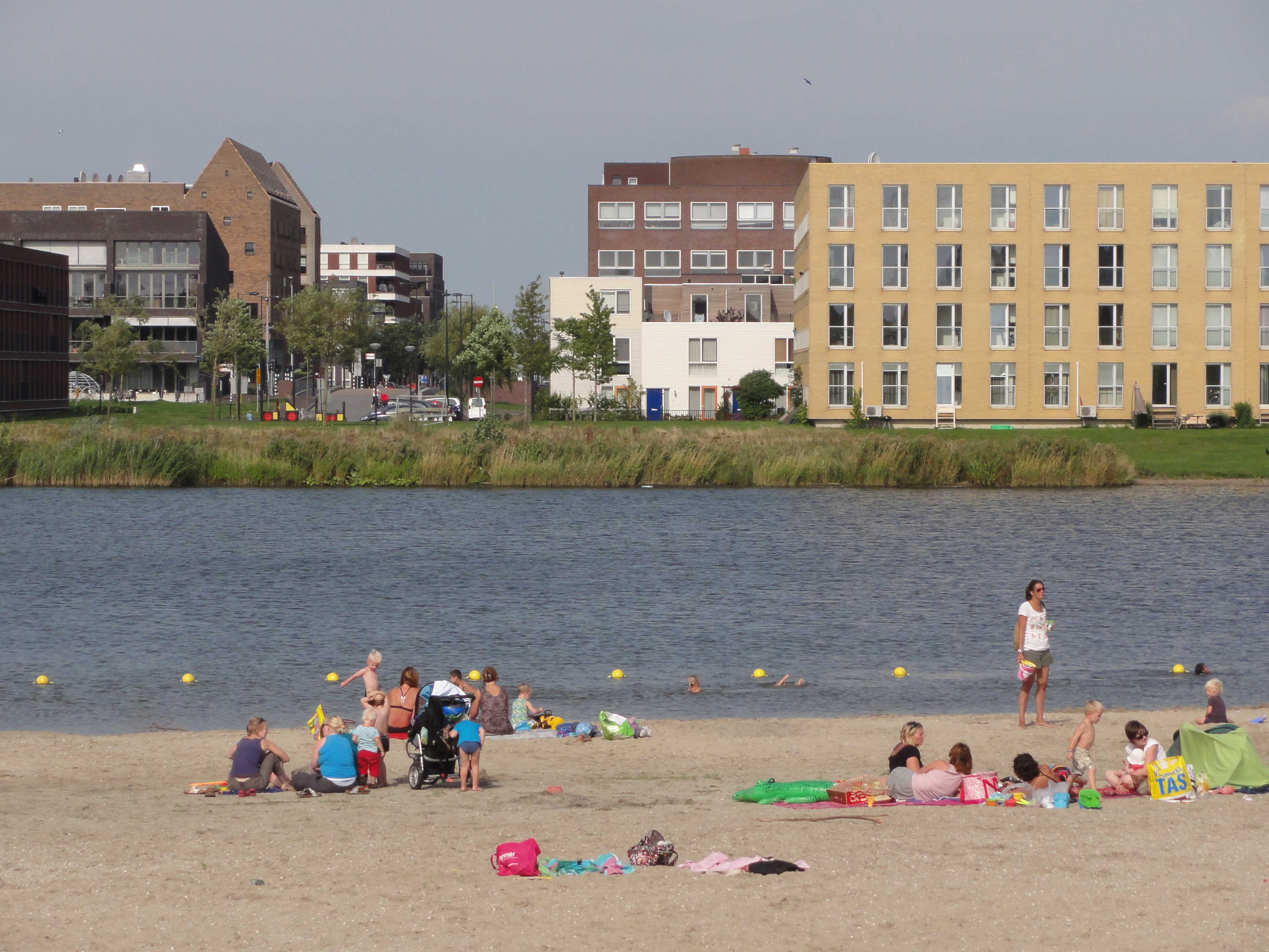
Beach on the IJmeer in the Diemerpark, with a view of IJburg

Diemerpark is the largest urban park in Amsterdam with an area of around 90 hectares, making it about twice as large as the famous Vondelpark in Amsterdam-Centrum. Diemerpark, located between IJburg and the Amsterdam-Rhine Canal, was opened in 2004 and offers numerous recreational opportunities for visitors.

== History ==
In the 12th century, the "Diemerzeedijk" (English: Diemerseadike) was built to protect the surrounding land against the floods of the Zuiderzee. However, the dikes bursted often. In 1932, the Afsluitdijk transformed the Zuiderzee into an inland lake without the devastating floods of the past. The area around the lake thus became a natural area with rich vegetation and many animal species.

In the 1960s and 1970s, the area of today's nature and urban park was used as a landfill for household and chemical waste. This made the Diemerzeedijk one of the most polluted places in the Netherlands. Until 1973, chemical waste was burned in a part of the area. This caused the area to become very polluted. Ten years later the dump was permanently closed. Soil remediation took place from 1998 to 2001. In 2004, the park was opened to visitors. The chemical waste was dumped illegally for years. The municipality of Amsterdam was able to avoid legal prosecution in a settlement procedure (Dutch: "schikking") by paying 100,000 euros to the Dutch state.

However, after the landfill was closed, a rugged nature reserve with a great biodiversity developed. Research showed that the pollution did not pose a direct danger to humans and animals, but because of the construction of IJburg, plans were made to clean up the area. Because of the extent of the pollution, the area was "wrapped" underground by sheet piles and covered with a waterproof top layer consisting of bentonite clay and foil. The park was built on top of that. This makes the park a kind of roof garden on the former landfill. As a result, visitors are not allowed to dig holes, and it is not possible to leave deep-rooted trees of more than 5 meters high there. The groundwater is pumped away and purified. A story can be read on the manhole covers.

At the entrances to the park, visitors are made aware that there are some restrictions on using the nature park: neither humans nor dogs are allowed to dig on the site, the installation of poles or tent pegs is prohibited and dogs must be kept on a leash. According to the municipality of Amsterdam, the groundwater is not contaminated and therefore harmless to trees and plants. The southeastern part of the park is largely inaccessible to visitors as it consists of swamp. There are now a large number of animals in the natural area, around 200 species of birds, grass snakes, shrews, nightingales, bluethroats, kingfishers and others. In addition, around 200 plant species have been counted and some mammals have returned to the nature park, including deer, bats and stoats. Reptiles such as the grass snake are harmless to visitors.

== Events ==
The sixth theatre festival took place on September 6, 2010, with street, music, puppet theatre and dance performances. On the west-side is a sports venue with 3 football pitches and 3 hockey fields. There are also hiking and cycling trails, a small beach and open-air theatre. The last festival took place on September 9, 2012.

== Access ==
The park is connected via bridges to the Rieteilanden of IJburg. It is also accessible via the Nescio Bridge over the Amsterdam-Rhine Canal or via the Diemerzeedijk.
