= IJtram =

Amsterdam tram line 26

IJtram Amsterdam tram line 26
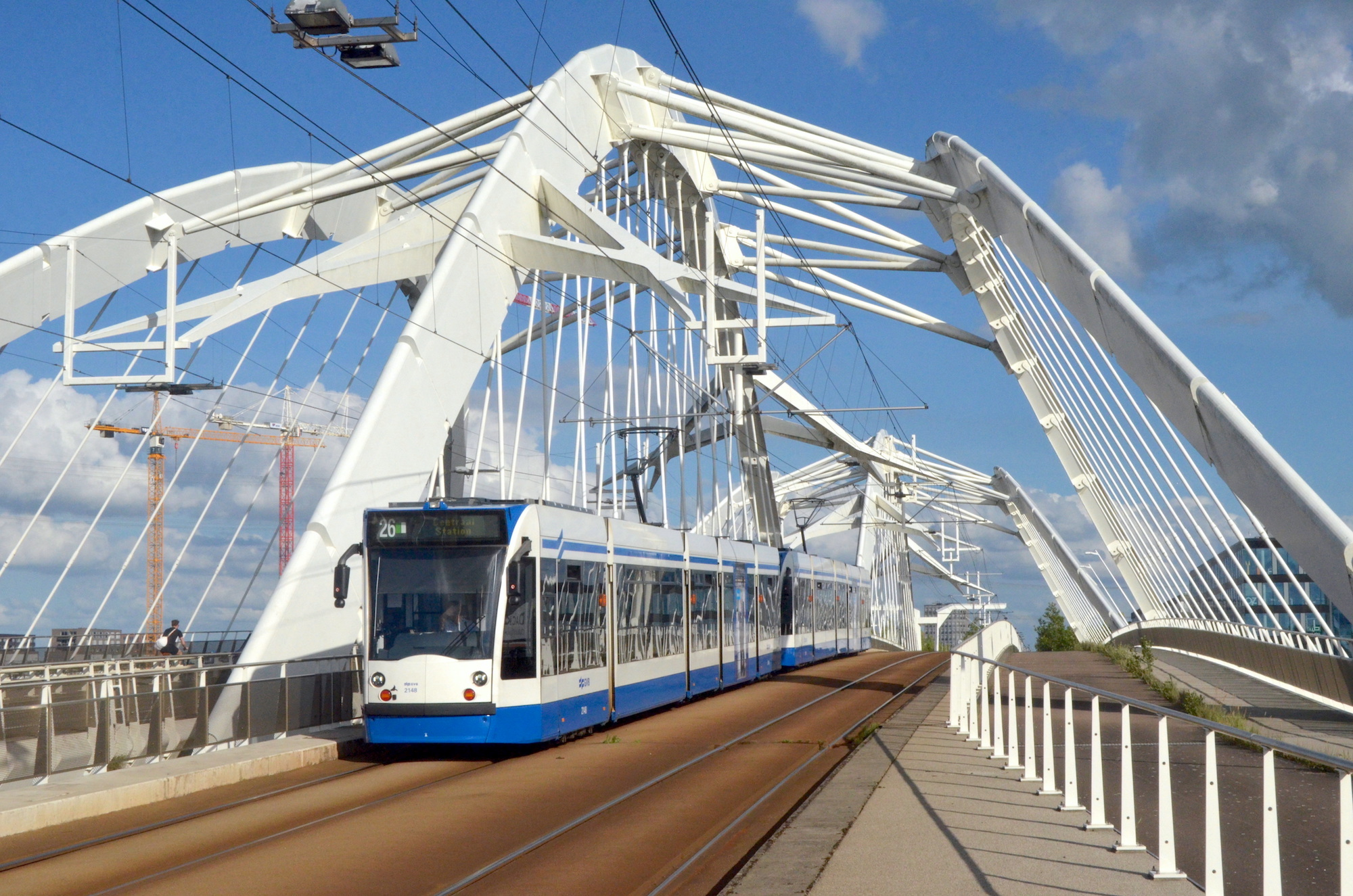
- Coupled pair of Combino trams on Enneüs Heerma Bridge

Overview
- Locale: Amsterdam
- Termini: Amsterdam Centraal station; IJburg
- Website: GVB: Line 26

Service
- System: Amsterdam tram
- Route number: 26
- Operator: Gemeente Vervoerbedrijf (GVB)
- Rolling stock: Combino

History
- Opened: 31 May 2005

Technical
- Line length: 10 kilometres (6.2 mi)
- Number of tracks: 2
- Track gauge: 1,435 mm (4 ft 8 1/2 in)
- Electrification: 600 V DC overhead

Amsterdam tram line 26, popularly known as the IJtram, is a tram line operating between Amsterdam Centraal station and the IJburg district in Amsterdam, the Netherlands. The IJtram was the busiest tram line in Amsterdam, carrying 30,000 riders per day in 2019. The 10-kilometre (6.2 mi) line has 14 stops and a scheduled end-to-end travel time of 25 minutes. It is of existential importance to the IJburg district, as it is the only public transport connection to the city centre for a suburb that is growing to a population of 45,000. When it is interrupted a free replacement bus 76 operates.

== Infrastructure ==
From the eastern side of Stationsplein, the square in front of Amsterdam Centraal station, line 26 runs eastbound beside the streets De Ruijterkade and Piet Heinkade within the Eastern Docklands area. The line continues through a short tunnel under Piet Heinkade, to enter the Rietlandpark stop, which lies in an open pit requiring tram riders to use stairs or lifts to go between the street and platform levels. Eastbound from Rietlandpark, trams pass through the 1.5-kilometre (0.93 mi) Piet Hein Tunnel to surface on Zeeburgereiland (NL:eiland = EN:island) where there is a tram storage yard. Proceeding further east, the tram line crosses the Enneüs Heerma Bridge onto Steigereiland and then crosses another bridge (Brug 2002) onto Haveneiland to terminate at the IJburg stop.

The IJtram runs in a right-of-way separated from road traffic except for level crossings at cross-streets and some mixed traffic at the line's two terminal loops at Amsterdam Centraal station and at the IJburg stop. The only rail connection between the IJtram and the rest of the tram system is at Centraal station; because of this, diversions to other tram lines are not possible in the event of a disruption along the line.

The line uses coupled pairs of unidirectional Combino trams, with each pair having a total length of 60 metres (200 ft). Coupled trams have a crew of two, a driver on the first tram and a conductor on the second. Both sell tickets, but the GVB encourages passengers without tickets to board the second tram. Trams on the line can be scheduled to run as frequently as every 4 minutes.

For safety reasons, only one coupled pair of trams is allowed in the Piet Hein Tunnel per direction of travel. In the event of an emergency, this restriction gives emergency workers easier access to the site. Trams require 3 minutes to ride through the tunnel, and trams must enter and leave the tunnel on schedule to avoid a bottleneck at the tunnel entrance. All trams using the tunnel must be equipped with ATB, a Dutch implementation of Automatic Train Control.

Centraal station has two stops for the IJtram. The regular stop is on the eastern half of Stationsplein on the south side of the station. An "emergency" stop (noodhalte) is located on the east or "IJ" side (IJzijde) of the station, which is used only when the regular stop is not available due to special events or construction projects.

The IJtram has its own tram storage yard (IJtramstalling) on Zeeburgereiland near the Bob Haarmslaan tram stop. It can store up to 32 trams and handle the coupled pairs of trams used on the line. The yard has a carwash and a sand filling station for trams. Major tram maintenance must be done elsewhere. Every 12 weeks, each tram must be sent to the Havenstraat depot for maintenance, and every 24 weeks to the GVB workshops in Diemen to grind flat wheels round.

== History ==
On 31 May 2005, the IJtram opened, operating as tram line 26. Trams operated every 10 minutes in rush hours and every 15 minutes in the off-hours. A park and ride facility (P+R Zeeburg) also opened which, along with local residents along the line, provided ridership for the new line. Also, the IJtram storage yard (IJburgstalling) had opened on Zeeburgereiland to store up to 18 trams.

On 8 December 2017, line 26 became the first tram line in Amsterdam to stop accepting cash for fare payment on board the tram. Payment could still be made via OV-chipkaart or by a credit or debit card having a personal identification number. Because of the tunnel and the line's stand-alone status, the GVB considered line 26 to be ideal for the introduction of cashless payment on trams. GVB busses had been cashless since March 2017.

Starting July 2018, the line was running up to 15 trams per hour during the morning and afternoon rush hours.

In October 2019, an alternative turning circle for the IJtram was completed on the IJ side of Centraal Station for use when events such as Koningsdag or Gay Pride block the regular stop on Stationsplein. Work on the loop had started in March 2008, and was completed in time for track replacement on Stationsplein in 2020. The cost to construct the loop was 7 million euros.

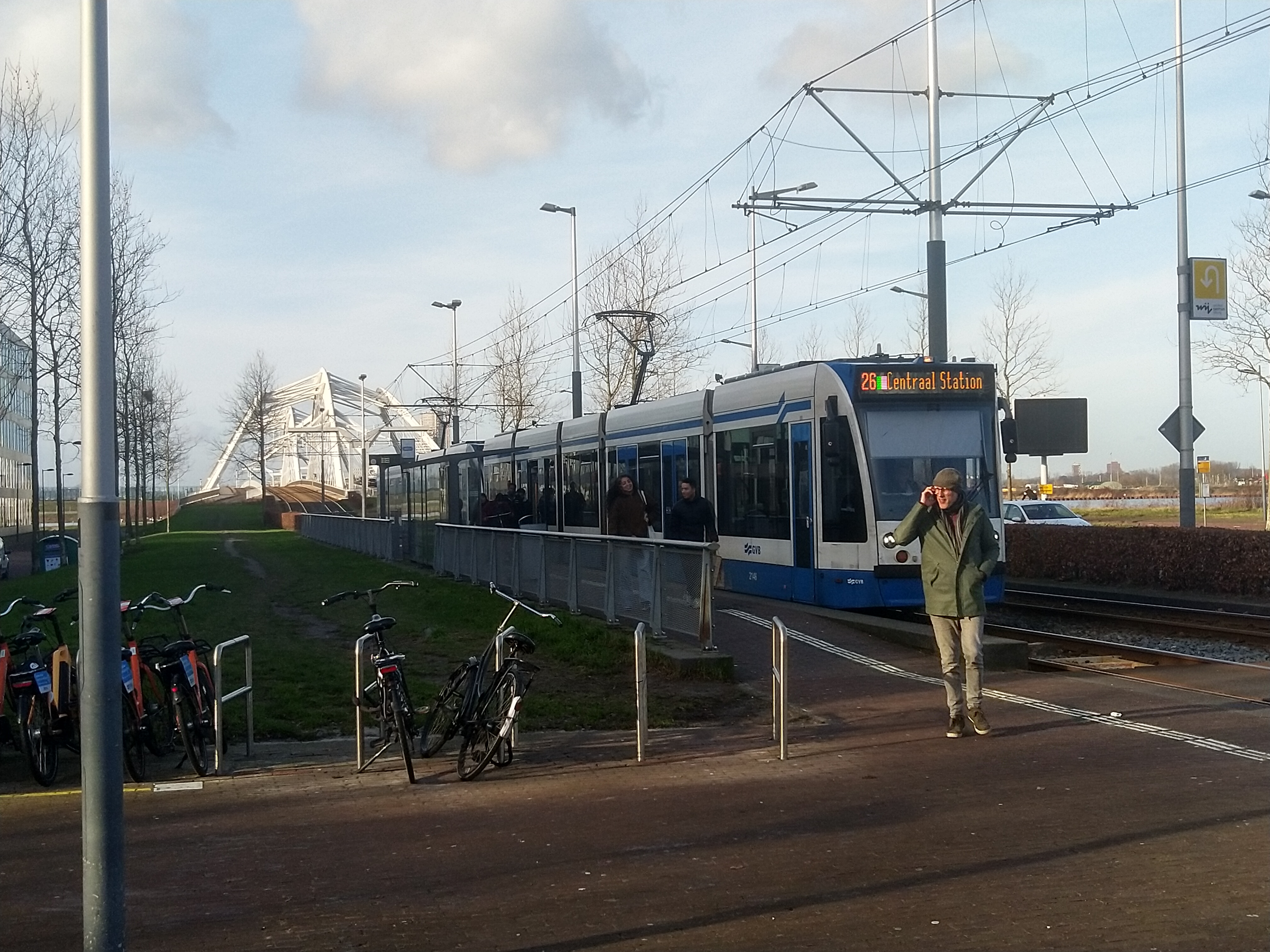
Coupled 26 tram at Steigereiland stop in IJburg, Amsterdam, with Enneüs Heermabrug in background (27 Jan 24). It is showing the wrong destination.

On 28 September 2020, the GVB started operating coupled pairs of trams on the IJtram. Test running of coupled pairs had started in 2017. Due to growth in the number of residents in the IJburg area plus riders from the park-and-ride facility on Zeeburgereiland, the line had reached its capacity using single trams. Coupled trams doubled that capacity. Implementing coupled trams during the COVID-19 pandemic, which reduced ridership, the GVB operated nine coupled pairs with a tenth pair held in reserve.

Also on 28 September 2020, the IJtram storage yard (IJburgstalling), reopened after a renovation to increase its capacity to 32 trams and to handle coupled pairs of trams.

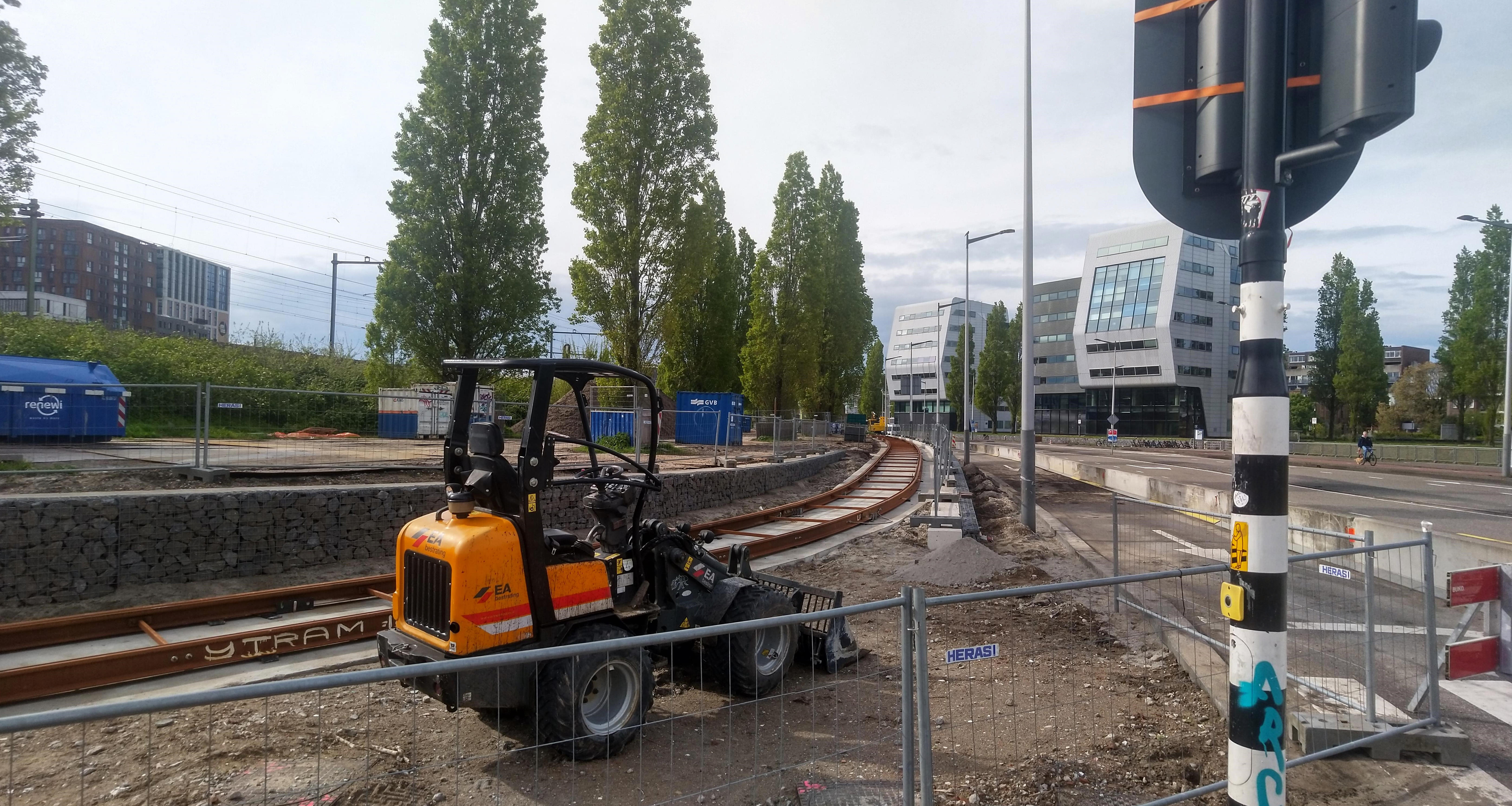
Newly-built link between Amsterdam tramlines 26 and 7 at Rietlandpark (27 Apr 24)

Between mid 2024 and 2029, ProRail will be rebuilding the railway bridges east of Centraal Station, thus preventing the passage of trams under them. Thus, IJtrams needed to divert to the turning circle on the IJ side of Centraal Station. In the first half of 2024 a temporary single track was laid at Rietlandpark connecting the IJtram with the route of tram 7 in Czaar Peterstraat to allow IJtrams to reach the depot. The IJ turning circle was widened to better accommodate the diversion.

On 31 August 2026, the line was extended to Strandeiland with three new stops at Centrumeiland, Buiteneilandlaan and Franz Kafkasstraat (new terminus). Very few people lived along the extension when it opened, as buildings in the area were still largely under construction. The municipality estimated that the area would eventually have 20,000 residents.

== Expansion ==
By 2018, there were proposals, costing at least 330 million euros, to expand tram service to IJburg to handle traffic from 8,000 planned new residences. In one proposal, the IJtram would be extended to Centrumeiland and Strandeiland to be completed in two phases in 2023 and 2028. Another proposal was to establish a tram connection south from Zeeburgereiland over a new bridge near the existing Amsterdamsebrug (Amsterdam Bridge) which was not strong or wide enough for a new tram line. Instead of a new tram line, bus service was also considered. Subsequently, an extension of the tram line to Strandeiland was decided. As of May 2022, the GVB said the extension would require the purchase of 13 additional trams. In 2023, construction started on the extension and includes two new bridges. Trams started to operate on the three-stop extension to Strandeiland on 31 August 2026. A further extension of the line to Pampusbuurt has a expected opening in 2035.

== Gallery ==
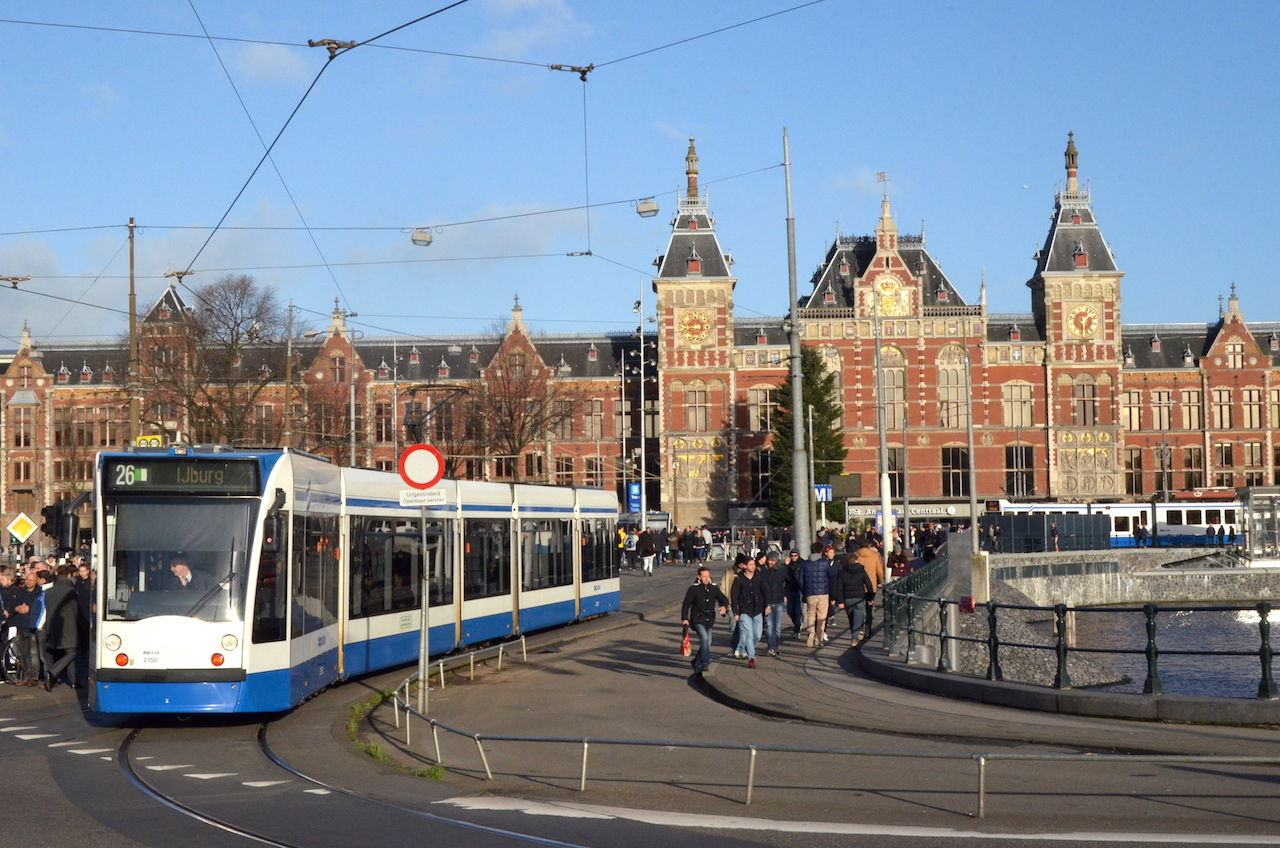
Line 26 tram running around a loop in front of Centraal station

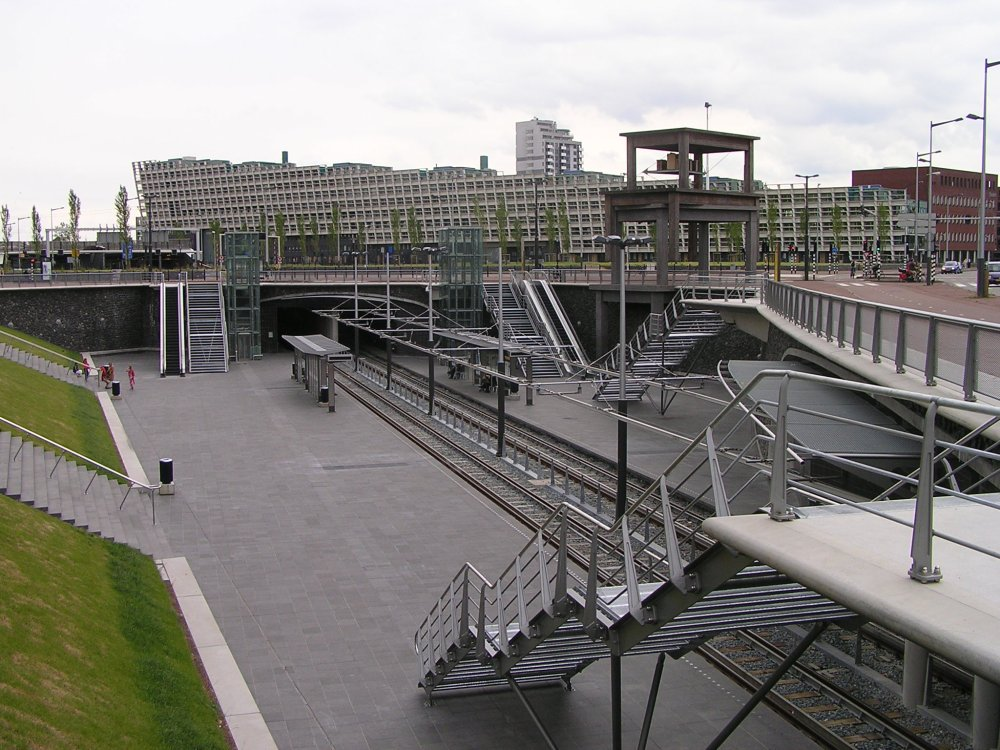
Rietlandpark tram stop lying between two tunnels along line 26

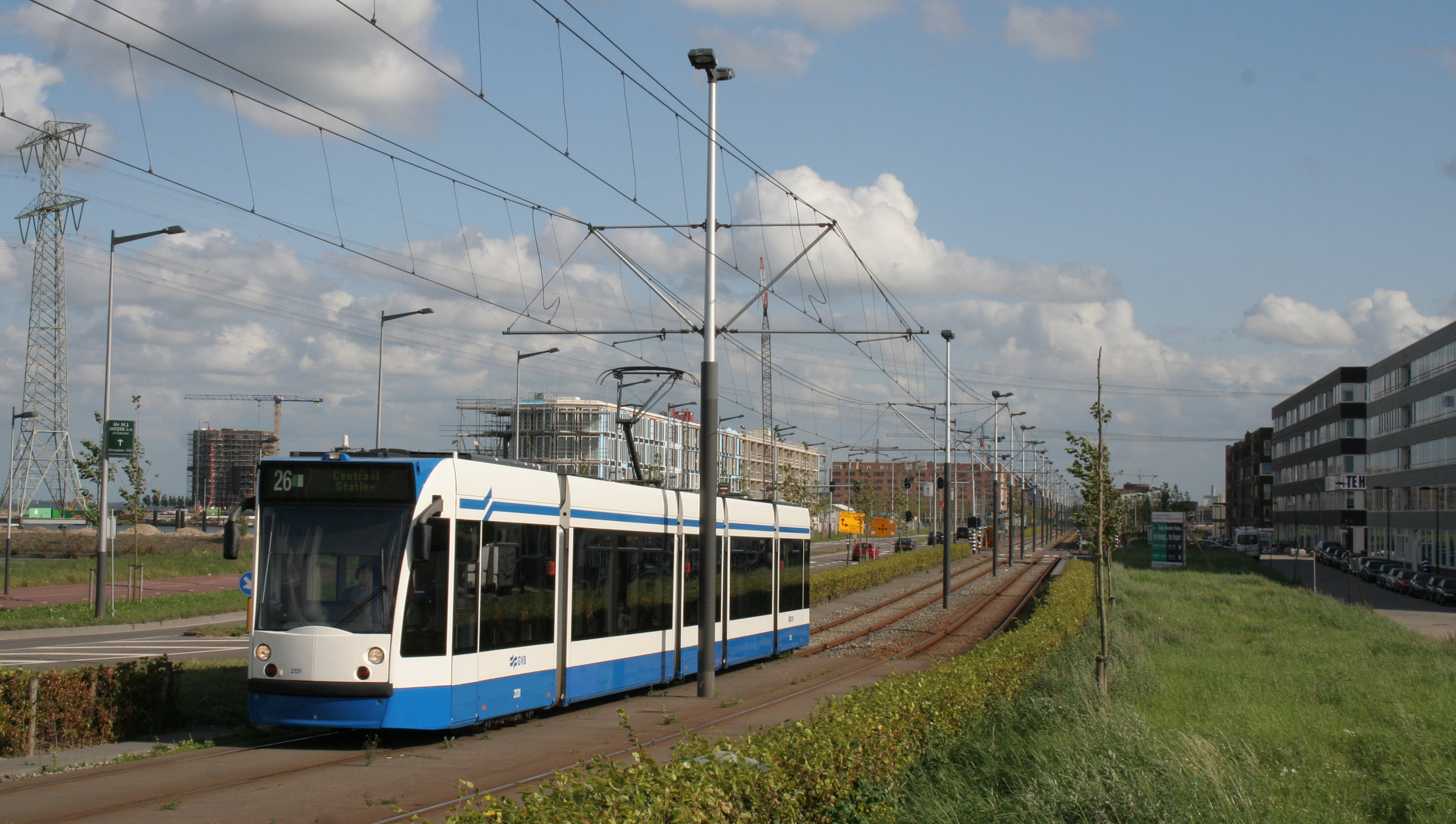
Line 26 running beside IJburglaan on Steigereiland

Turning loop on Strandeiland

== See also ==
- Amsteltram: Amsterdam tram line 25 also uses coupled pairs of trams on a right-of-way separated from road traffic.
