= Enneüs Heerma Bridge =

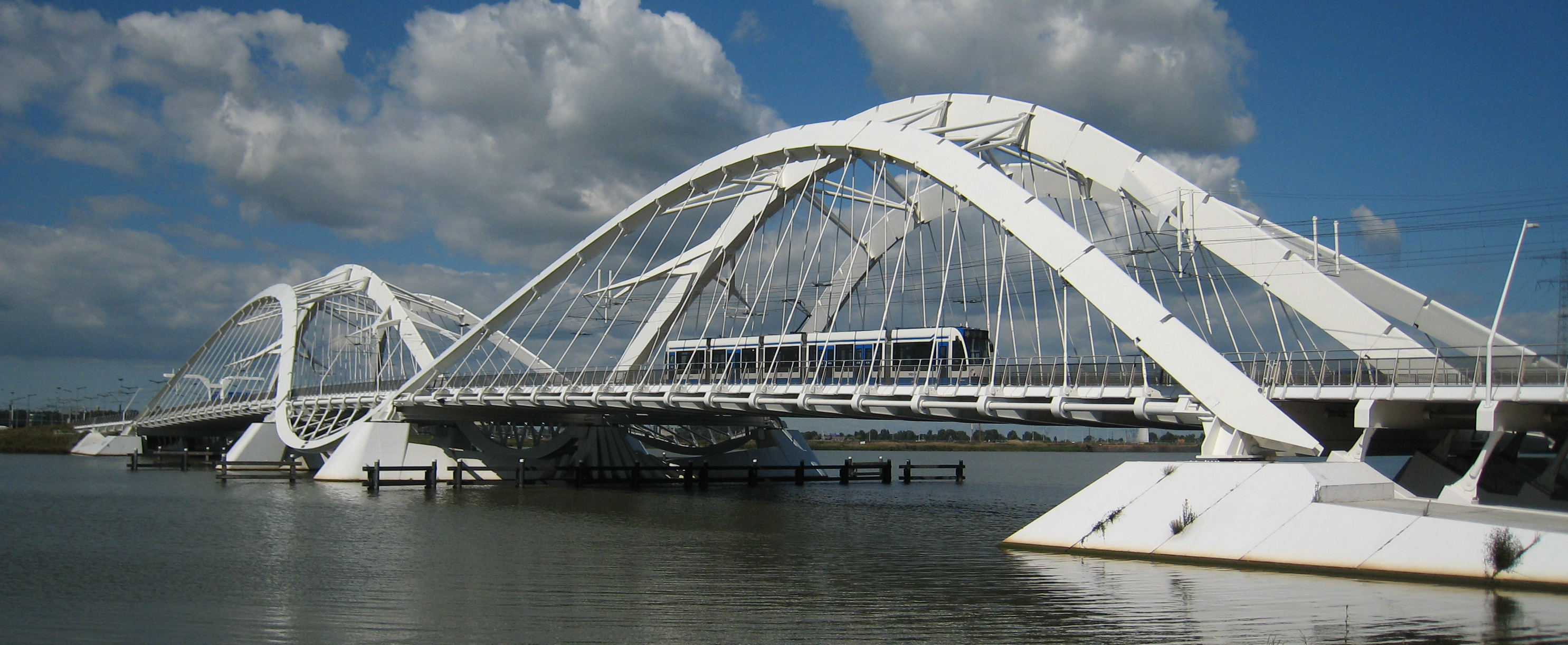
- Coordinates: 52°21′54″N 4°58′36″E
- Carries: Road traffic and light rail
- Locale: Amsterdam, Netherlands

Characteristics
- Material: Steel
- Total length: 230 metres (750 ft)
- Width: 38 metres (125 ft)
- Height: 26 metres (85 ft)

History
- Designer: Grimshaw Architects
- Construction cost: NLG 55,000,000 (€26,500,000)
- Opened: 2001

Location
- Interactive map of Enneüs Heerma Bridge

The Enneüs Heerma Bridge (Dutch: Enneüs Heermabrug) is a bridge in Amsterdam, Netherlands located in the new neighbourhood of IJburg, built on seven artificial islands in the IJmeer. It connects the district of Zeeburgereiland, on the eastern edge of the city, with Steigereiland, to the south.

The bridge is named after Enneüs Heerma, who served as Leader of the Christian Democratic Appeal, alderman in Amsterdam and State Secretary twice under Prime Minister Ruud Lubbers. Alongside the Nescio Bridge which is a cycle and footbridge connecting IJburg to East Amsterdam, it is one of the neighbourhood's best known landmarks.

== Construction ==
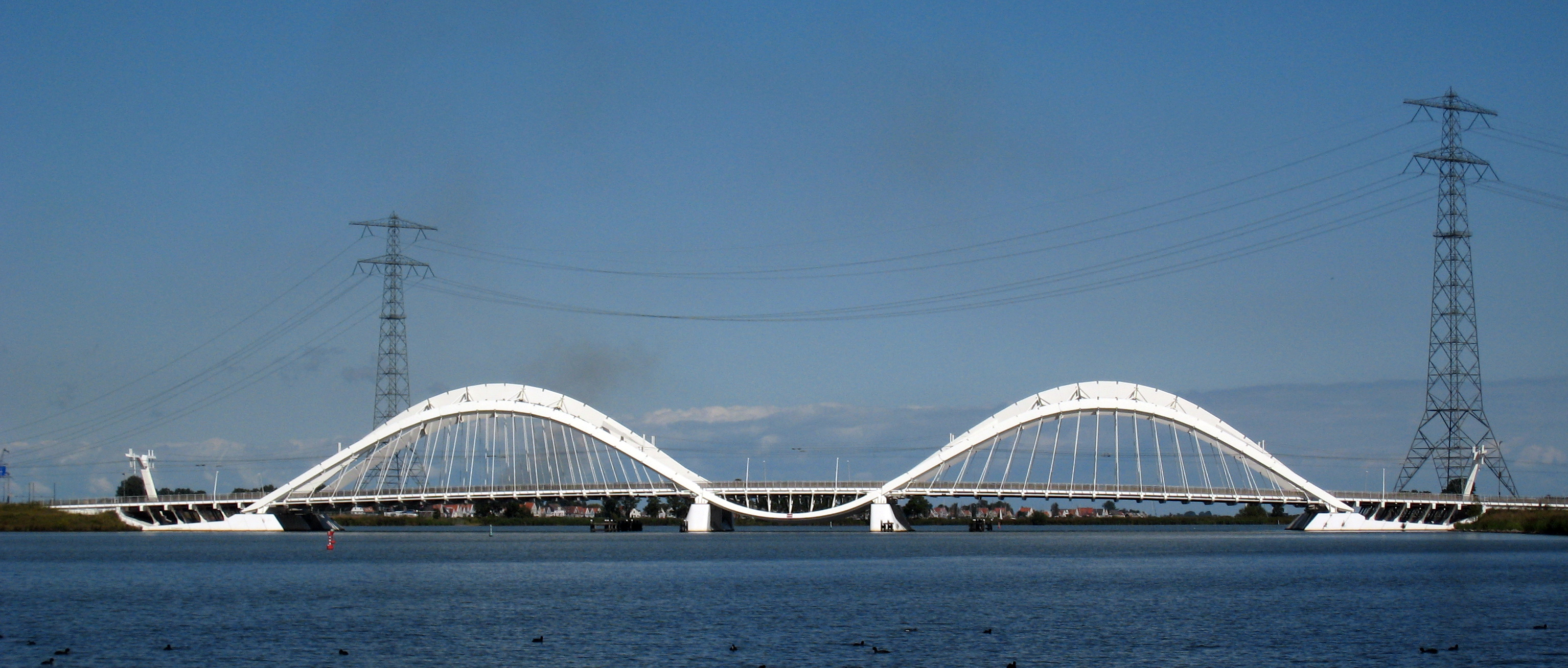
Side view of the Enneüs Heerma Bridge

Made of steel, with a length of 230 metres (750 ft), a width of 38 metres (125 ft), and a height of 26 metres (85 ft), the suspended deck of the bridge serves to carry a traffic road and a light rail (tram) line. It is the main connection between IJburg and the A10 and can be reached by tram 26, the IJtram, from Amsterdam Centraal station.

Completed in 2001, the bridge was designed by Grimshaw Architects. The classic gables of Amsterdam’s canal houses inspired the arches and lateral gables and the wavy patterns refer to water. The segmented appearance is based on the skeleton of a crab. The shallowness of the water at the bridge site made it impossible to use floating cranes to lift the pre-assembled arches of the bridge into position during construction. The problem was solved by using pontoons and crawler cranes.
