= Steigereiland =

- Neighborhood of Amsterdam
- Interactive map of Steigereiland
- Country: Netherlands
- Province: North Holland
- COROP: Amsterdam
- Time zone: UTC+1 (CET)

Steigereiland is a neighborhood of Amsterdam, Netherlands.

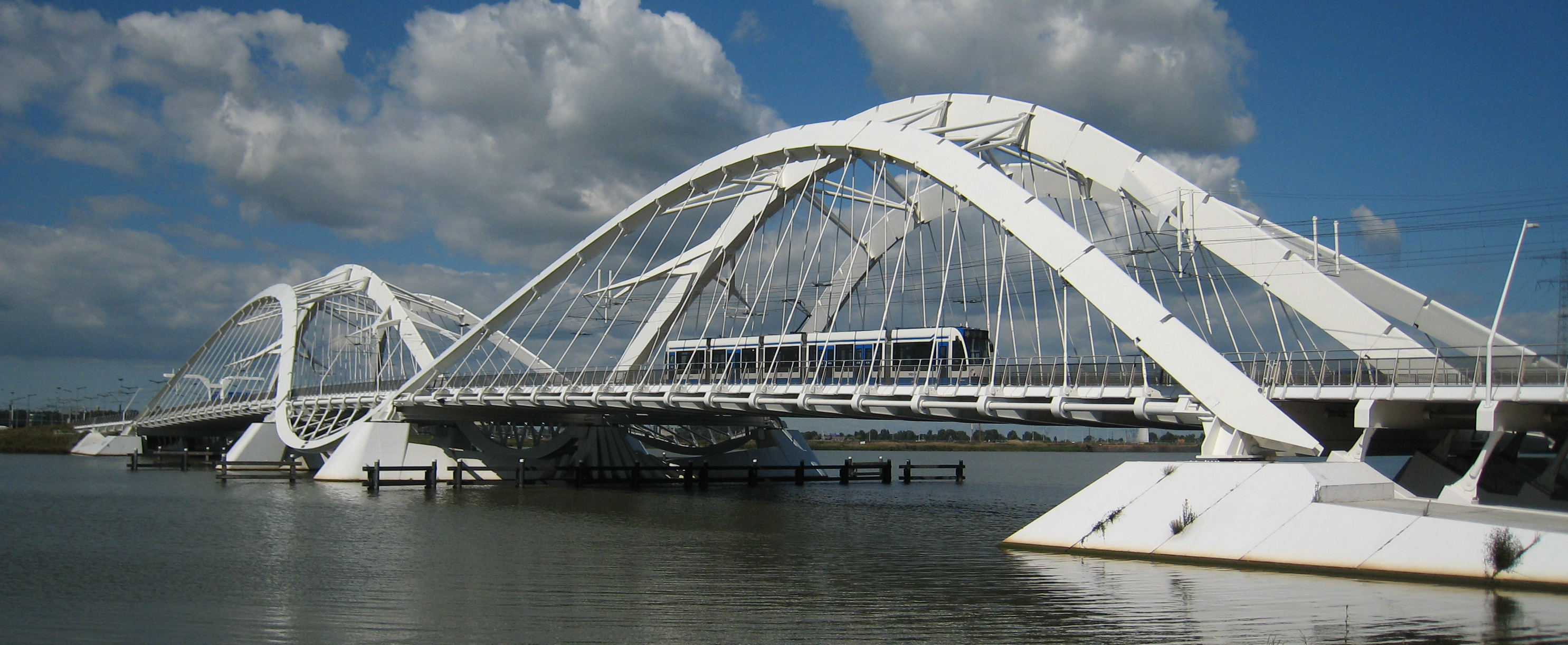
IJtram (line 26) crossing the Enneus Heerma Bridge which connects Steigereiland to Zeeburgereiland.

Steigereiland is the first of the IJburg Islands when approaching from central Amsterdam. The island comprises three neighbourhoods - Noodbuurt, Zuidbuurt and Waterbuurt - the last of which is home to a number of floating houses. Steigereiland is connected to Zeeburgereiland by the Enneüs Heermabrug.

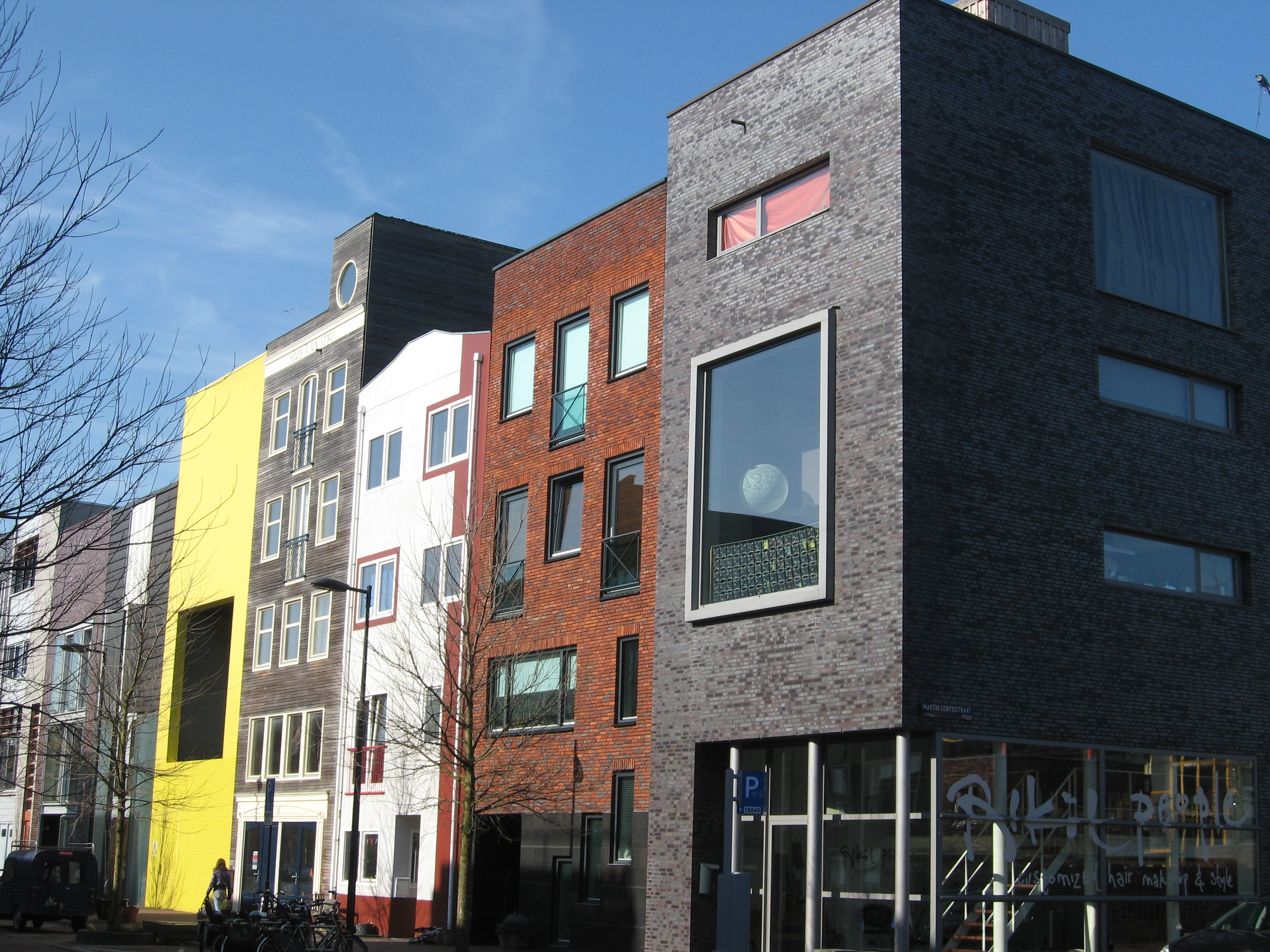
Self-build houses in Steigereiland Zuid

Once fully constructed, there will be around 2000 buildings on Steigereiland, including a number of self-build projects concentrated in the southern part of the island - these buildings are designed and constructed individually, resulting in a diverse array of architectural styles.

Steigereiland is served by tram line 26, the IJtram, which runs from the end of the neighbouring Haveneiland to its terminus at Central Station.
