= Nescio Bridge =

Nescio Bridge Nesciobrug
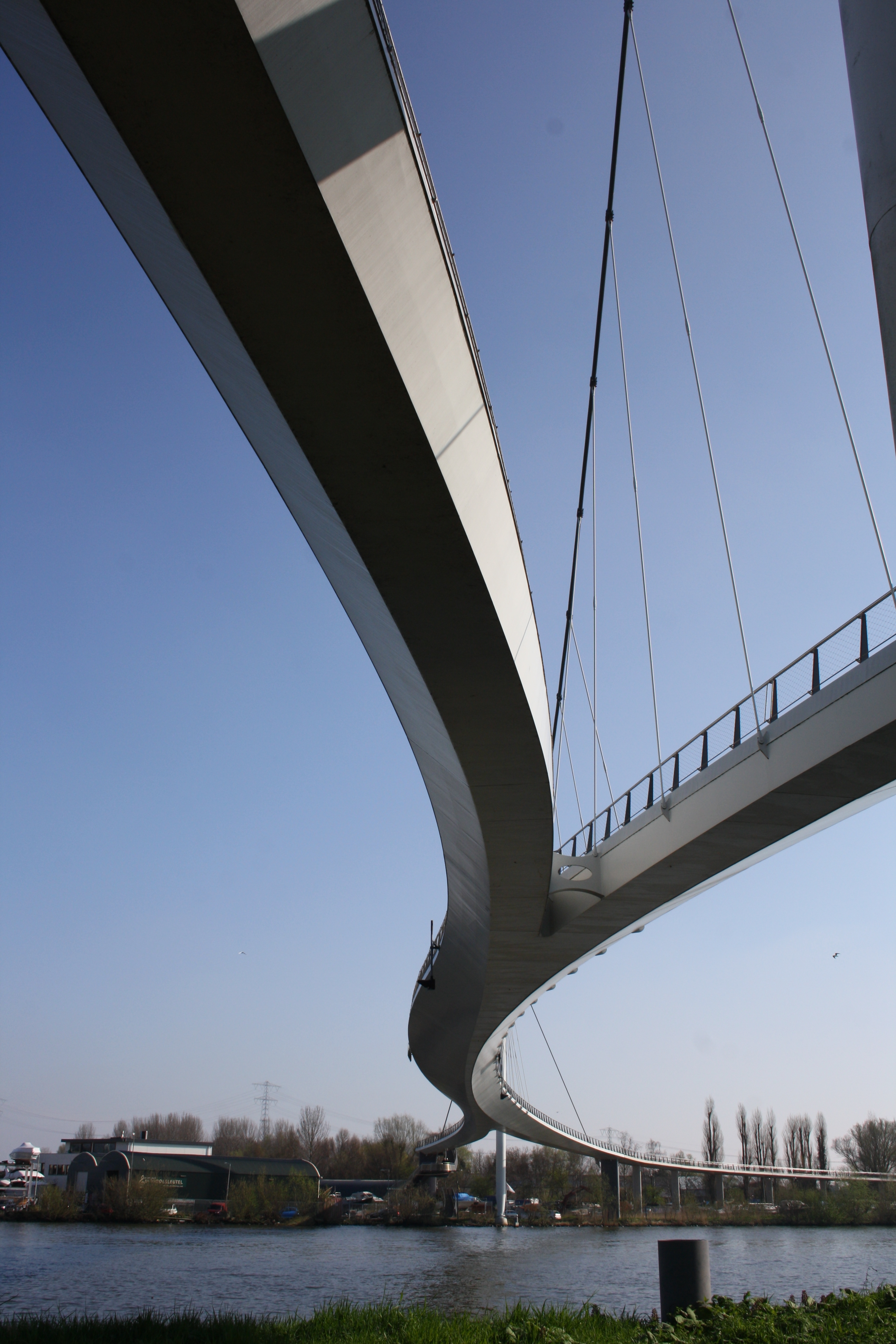
- View of the bridge from underneath
- Coordinates: 52.3555°N 4.9711°E
- Carries: cyclists, pedestrians
- Crosses: Amsterdam–Rhine Canal
- Locale: Amsterdam IJburg neighbourhood
- Other name(s): Palingbrug (literally "Eel bridge")
- Named for: Dutch writer Nescio
- Owner: City of Amsterdam
- ID number: Amsterdam bridge № 2013

Characteristics
- Material: Main span: steel ramps: concrete
- Total length: 780 m (2,559 ft)
- Longest span: 163.5 m (536 ft)
- Clearance below: 10 m (33 ft)

History
- Architect: Wilkinson Eyre Architects
- Engineering design by: ARUP; Grontmij
- Constructed by: VolkerWessels
- Fabrication by: Heerema Fabrication
- Construction end: 2006
- Construction cost: € 9.5 million or € 12.2 million
- Opened: 7 June 2006 for cyclists

Location
- Interactive map of Nescio Bridge

The Nescio Bridge (or Nesciobrug in Dutch) is a cycle and footbridge in the Netherlands. This curved, steel suspension bridge, located in Amsterdam, is the country's first suspension bridge that carries only a cycle track and footway, and at almost 800 metres length it is also one of the country's longest cycle and footbridges. Additionally, it is the longest single cable suspension bridge in the Netherlands.

The bridge was designed by Jim Eyre of London-based Wilkinson Eyre Architects, in cooperation with two multinational engineering consultancy firms: London-based ARUP group and Netherlands-based Grontmij. The design stands out by using a single, self-anchored cable.

The bridge has won several awards, including the 2007 IstructE Pedestrian Bridges Award, the 2007 Arthur G. Hayden Medal (Note: ‘For a single recent outstanding achievement in bridge engineering demonstrating innovation in special use bridges such as pedestrian, people-mover, or non-traditional structures.’) from the International Bridge Conference in Pittsburgh, and the 2006 Dutch national award for building in steel (the Nationale Staalprijs).

== Location ==
The Nescio Bridge spans the Amsterdam–Rhine Canal, connecting the new residential area of IJburg, built on artificial islands in Lake IJ, with the mainland, landing very near Amsterdam Science Park, between East Amsterdam and North Diemen. On the IJburg side, the bridge touches down on the Diemerzeedijk, a 13th-century clay dike on which Dutch writer Nescio frequently made long walks that he recounted in his work, hence the occasion for the bridge's name.

== Design and construction ==
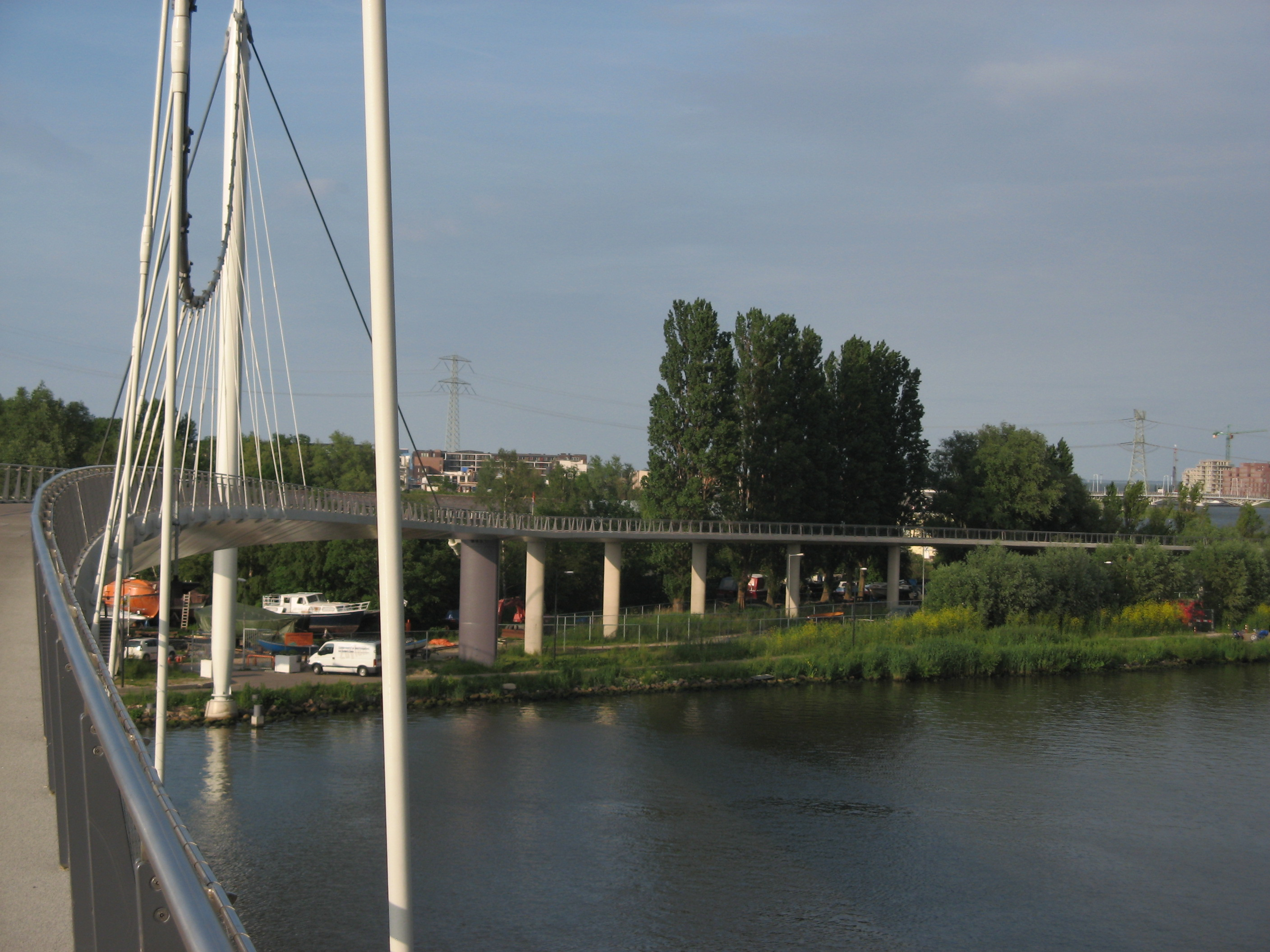
The swooping cycle ramp at the northern (IJburg) side of the bridge.

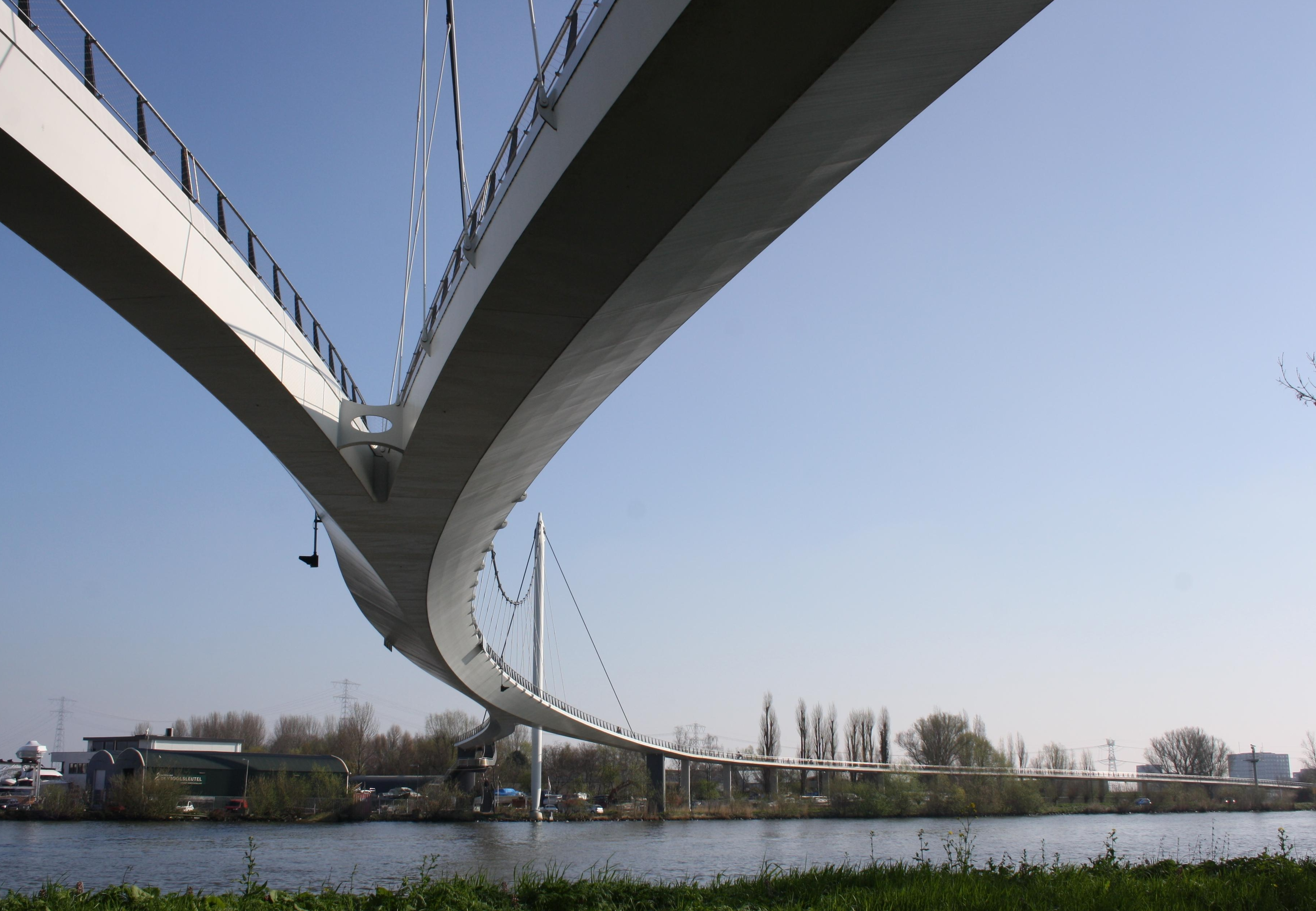
Towards the shores, the cycle and pedestrian tracks split, and each veer off in their own directions.

Because the Amsterdam–Rhine Canal is one of the most heavily used inland waterways in Europe, that connects the Port of Amsterdam, the fifth busiest port in Europe, via the river Rhine to its hinterland, the bridge had to offer sufficient clearance to commercial shipping traffic for unrestricted passage. In order to achieve the needed 10 m (33 ft) clearance, while at the same time providing a conveniently shallow gradient for cyclists, the bridge has long approaches at both ends. On the north end, the long access ramp was fitted in by a long curve onto the Diemerzeedijk, whereas the southern end terminates in an expansive spiral cycle ramp. The footbridge section connects to the shore with a spiral staircase at either end.

The main span was constructed off-site as a single steel structure of approximately 180 m (591 ft) long, weighing some 510 t (502 long tons; 562 short tons). In order to obstruct the busy shipping traffic on the canal as little as possible, it was hoisted into place within half a day on 9 July 2005. The cross-section of the bridge changes fluently from a deep triangular section at mid-span, where stiffness is needed, to a shallow section that merges into the concrete approaches. The angle of its sides makes it 'stealthy' to marine radar, again to ensure that it doesn't impede commercial shipping. Additionally, tuned mass dampers have been fitted, to prevent the bridge from wobbling as people walk across.

Suspension bridges are comparatively rare in the Netherlands, because the generally soft Dutch soil makes it difficult to properly anchor the main cables at the ends. On the Nescio Bridge this was solved by anchoring the cables to the bridge itself.

== See also ==
- The Hovenring, a circular cable-stayed bridge and bicycle roundabout near Eindhoven in the Netherlands.
- The Milky Way Bridge in Purmerend, another visually distinctive cycle and footbridge in the Netherlands.
- The Enneüs Heerma Bridge, the main road bridge to IJburg, also carrying tramways.
