= S114 =

S114 may refer to:

- County Route S114 (New Jersey), a county route in Bergen county
- S114 road in Amsterdam
- Greek submarine Papanikolis (S-114) (1972–1992), a Balao class submarine
