= Piet Hein Tunnel =

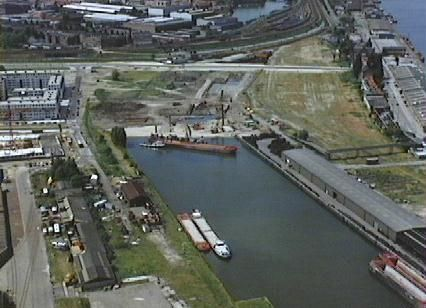
Construction of the tunnel in 1993.

The Piet Hein Tunnel (52.372962°N 4.947633°E) is a 1.9 km long tunnel under the IJ in Amsterdam, the Netherlands. It provides a road link running east–west between the city center and the A10 ring-road, and since May 2005 also provides a tram link between the Amsterdam Centraal railway station and Haveneiland, IJburg. Completed in 1997, the tunnel, approaches and related buildings were designed by the hypermodernist Dutch architectural firm Van Berkel + Bos, and was named after the Dutch naval hero Piet Hein.
