= Hovenring =

Suspended bicycle roundabout

Coordinates: 51°26′0.18″N 5°25′9.49″E

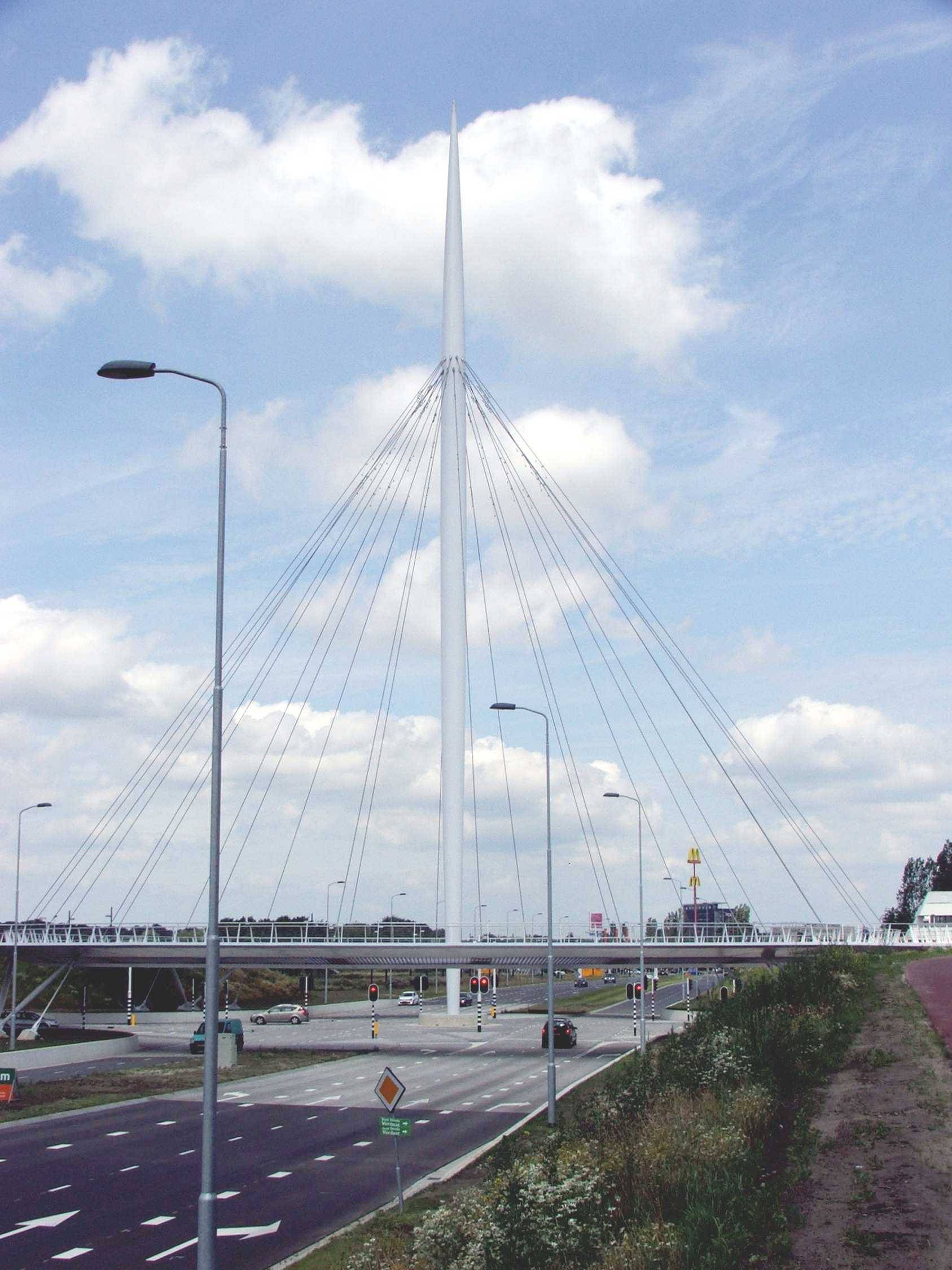
Hovenring

The Hovenring is a suspended cycle path roundabout in the province of North Brabant in the Netherlands. It is situated between the localities of Eindhoven, Veldhoven, and Meerhoven, which accounts for its name, and is the first of its kind in the world.

== History ==
The Hovenring was first conceived in 2008, when increased traffic between Eindhoven and Veldhoven was starting to overwhelm the capacity of the roundabout on the crossing of the roads known as Heerbaan in Veldhoven and the Meerenakkerweg (Heistraat).

In order to improve the flow of traffic and improve safety, it was decided to completely separate motorized and bicycle traffic. In addition, it was decided to transform the roundabout for cars into a regular crossing of streets, to improve the flow of traffic. This left a decision to be made about what to do about the bicycle traffic. The city council of Eindhoven decided that they wanted to develop an eye-catching project, in keeping with ambitions of the Brainport top technology region (a knowledge economy-driven cooperative of the municipalities in the Eindhoven metropolitan area).

The design for the Hovenring was made by the ipv Delft design agency. The name was chosen through a competition held among the population of Eindhoven and Veldhoven. Literally the name means "ring of the Hovens", referring to Eindhoven, Veldhoven and Meerhoven (the residential area of Eindhoven where the Hovenring is). In addition, the name refers to the suspended ring of the Hovenring, as well as to the ring and needle (the central pylon) of lights that are formed by the lights that adorn the construction. With the addition of the lights, the name also refers to Eindhoven's unofficial designation of "city of lights".

The construction started on 11 February 2011. The new crossing was opened on 30 December 2011. About a week later, the crossing was again closed for all traffic, because the suspension cables were found to vibrate in a manner that was considered harmful. The Hovenring was finally opened to the public on 29 June 2012.

== Construction ==
=== Design ===
The Hovenring is officially a roundabout, but in fact it is a circular cable-stayed bridge with the 72 metres (236 ft) diameter deck suspended from a single 70 metres (230 ft) tall central pylon by 24 cables. The entire construction is made of steel.

=== Vibration issues ===
The suspension bridge had to be closed almost immediately after delivery due to unexpected vibrations in the cables caused by the wind. An investigation of the problem was undertaken during the next several weeks by professors of civil and mechanical engineering from the Eindhoven University of Technology, the Delft University of Technology and professor Alberto Zasso of the Politecnico di Milano.

It was finally determined that the problem was vortices of wind forming in the lee of the cables, causing far heavier vibrations than expected during design. A solution was found by applying additional dampers on the cables. Unfortunately this caused an extra delay of a month in the opening of the bridge, since the contractor initially mounted the dampers incorrectly.

== Comparison ==
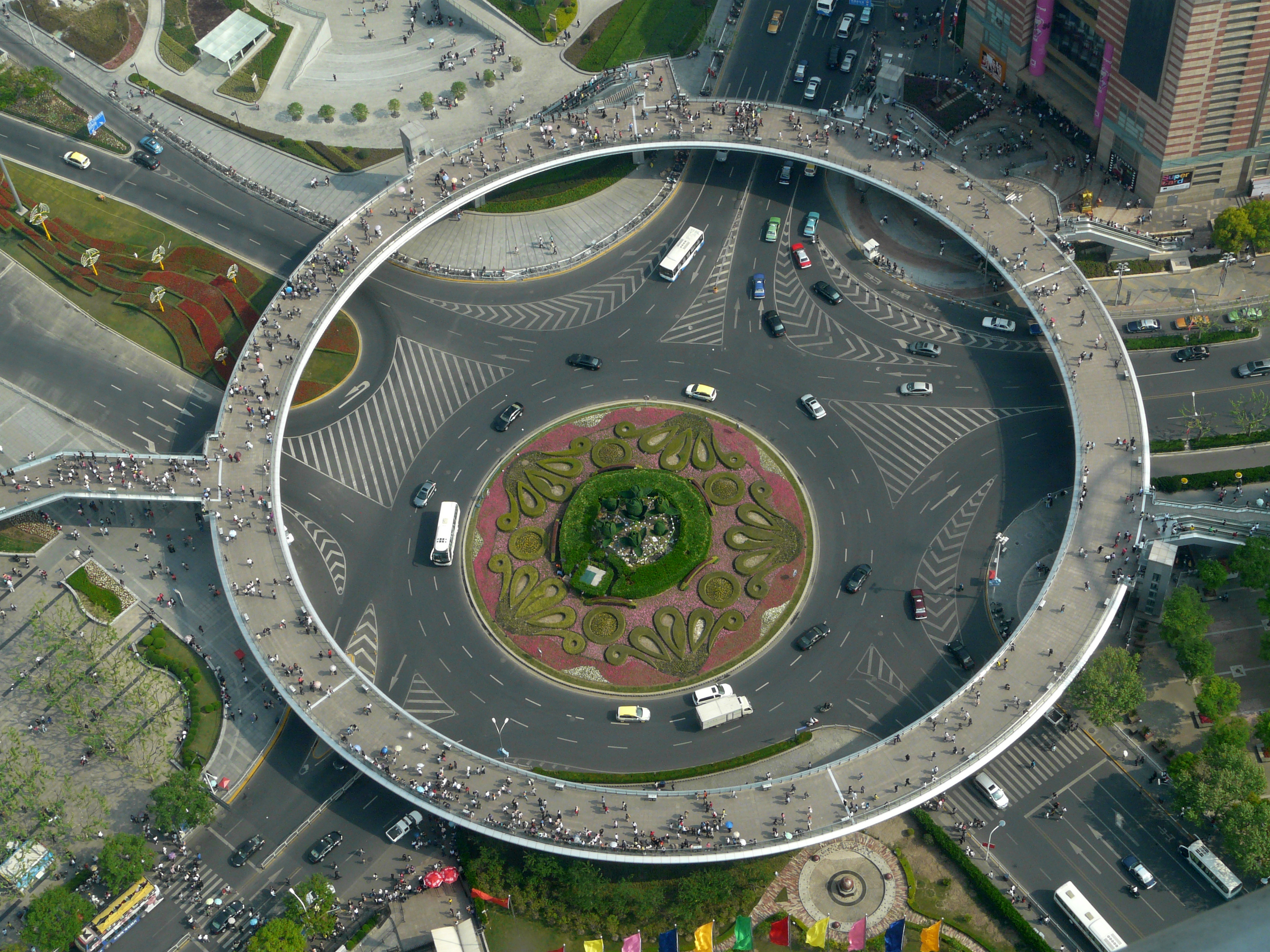
Circular Pedestrian Bridge in Lujiazui, China

An important predecessor to the Dutch design is the cycle overpass roundabout of Tjensvollkrysset in Stavanger, Norway. Opened in 2010, it bears remarkable resemblance to the Hovenring, sharing for instance its 72 m diameter.

The construction is out of concrete rather than steel, and support is more conventional. Considering the Eindhoven ring was designed from 2008 onwards, the designs may very well have been conceived independently of each other.

A comparison must also be made with the 2011 circular pedestrian overpass of Lujiazui in the Pudong district of Shanghai and with a similar overpass from 2012 in Rzeszów, Poland.

== Gallery ==
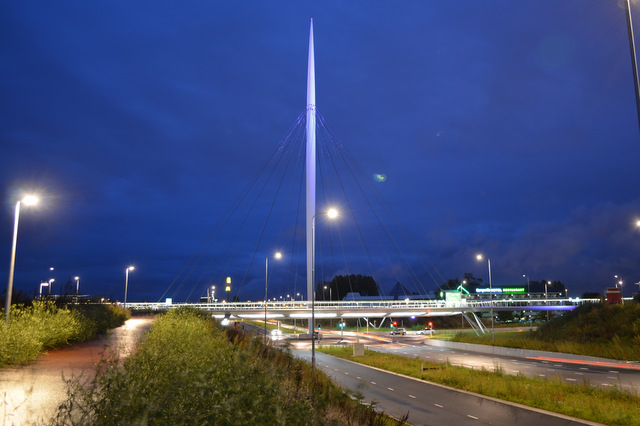
Full view of Hovenring at night

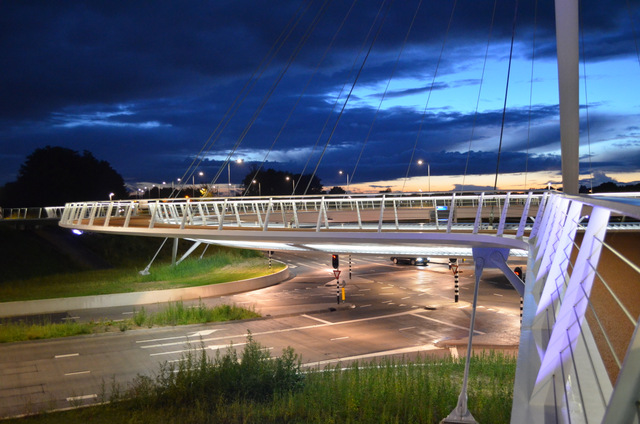
Side view of Hovenring at night

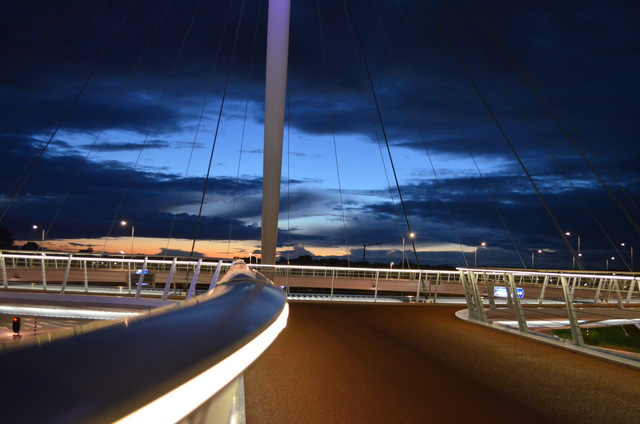
Hovenring at night up close

== See also ==
- More photos of Hovenring
- Nescio Bridge, an international award-winning suspension bridge for cyclists and pedestrians in East Amsterdam.
