= IJburg =

Neighbourhood in Amsterdam, Netherlands

Coordinates: 52°21′18″N 4°59′52″E

- Neighbourhood of Amsterdam
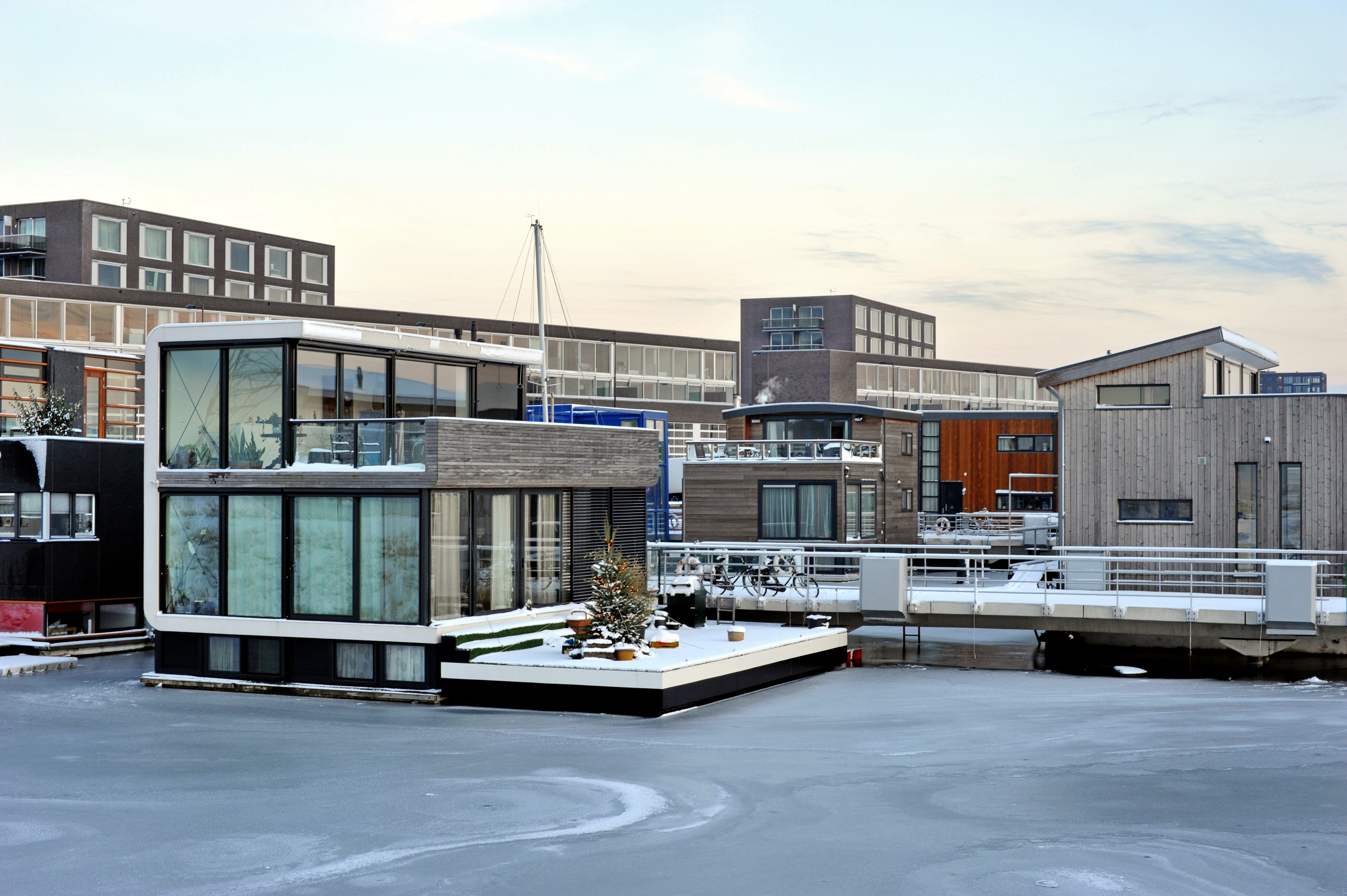
- Houses in IJburg nearby frozen water during winter 2010

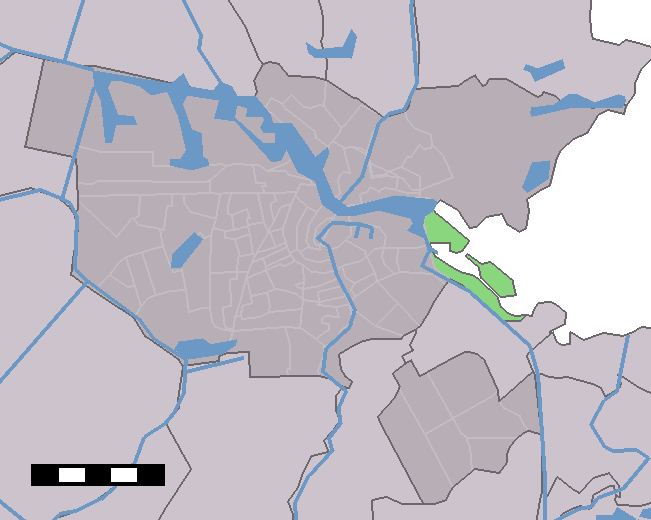
- Location of IJburg (green) in Amsterdam
- Country: Netherlands
- Province: North Holland
- Municipality: Amsterdam
- Borough: Oost

Area
  - Total: 915.99 ha (2,263.5 acres)
  - Land: 376.63 ha (930.7 acres)

Population (2025)
  - Total: 26,107
  - Density: 10,088/km^{2} (26,130/sq mi)

IJburg (Dutch pronunciation: [ˈɛibʏr(ə)x]) is a residential neighbourhood under construction in Amsterdam, Netherlands. It is situated in the IJmeer and is being built on artificial islands which have been raised from the lake. The Haveneiland, Rieteilanden, Steigereiland and Centrumeiland are already inhabited as of 2004. It is part of Amsterdam-Oost and lies adjacent to Diemerpark, one of the city's largest parks.

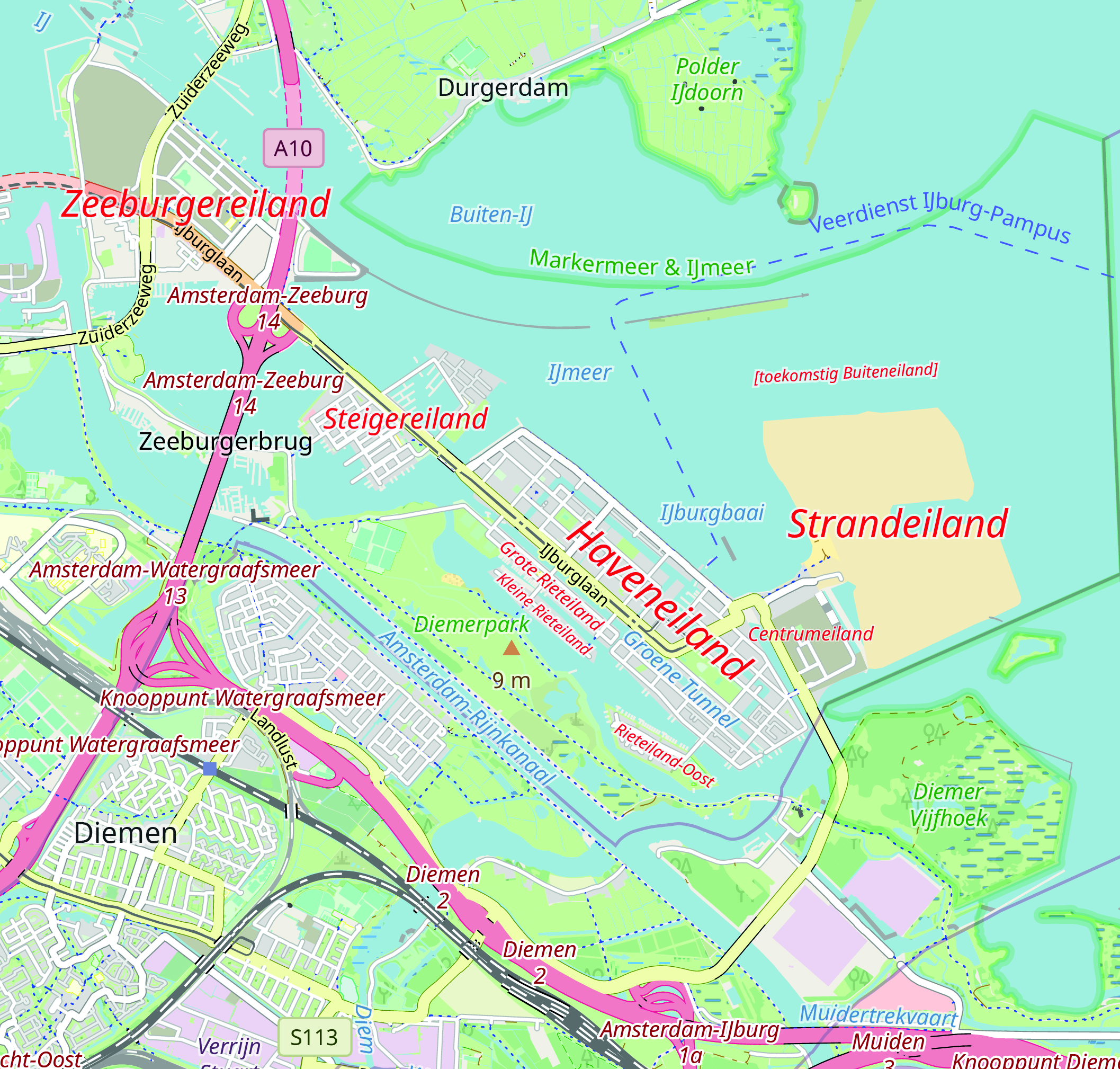
Map showing the constituent islands of IJburg (October 2020)

== History ==
=== Planning (1965–1997) ===
In 1965, the architects Jo van den Broek and Jacob B. Bakema designed the Pampus Plan for a town in the IJmeer intended to house 350,000 residents, most of whom were to come from crowded Amsterdam. But national plans changed and people were instead encouraged to move from the city to the expanding towns in the neighbouring areas such as Purmerend, Hoorn and the new city of Almere. The Bijlmermeer neighbourhood was also constructed south of the city and Diemen was expanded.

Policy changes in the 1980s resulted in the development of construction nearer to the city. Amsterdam is located between Schiphol and important nature reserves and polders near the river Amstel in Amstelveen and Landelijk Noord, the only location possible for development was Nieuw-Oost (New East).

The municipality approved the building of the neighbourhood in 1996. Opponents of the plan called for a referendum because of the possible negative effects for the ecosystem of the IJmeer. A referendum was held on 19 March 1997 and although the majority of votes (133,000) were against construction, they fell short of the 155,000 vote threshold. The construction was thus allowed to proceed.

=== Construction (1997–present) ===
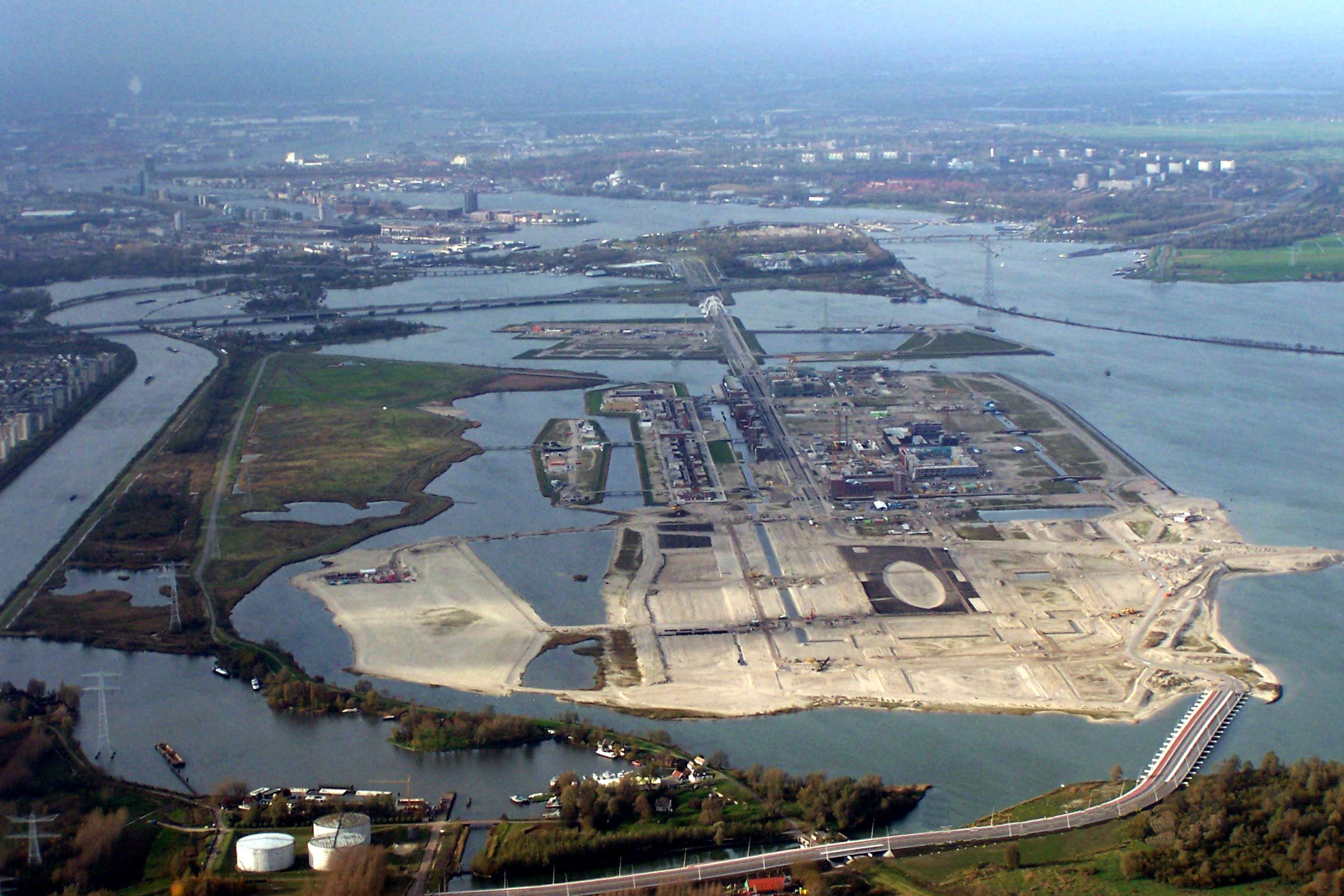
Aerial photograph of IJburg under construction (November 2004)

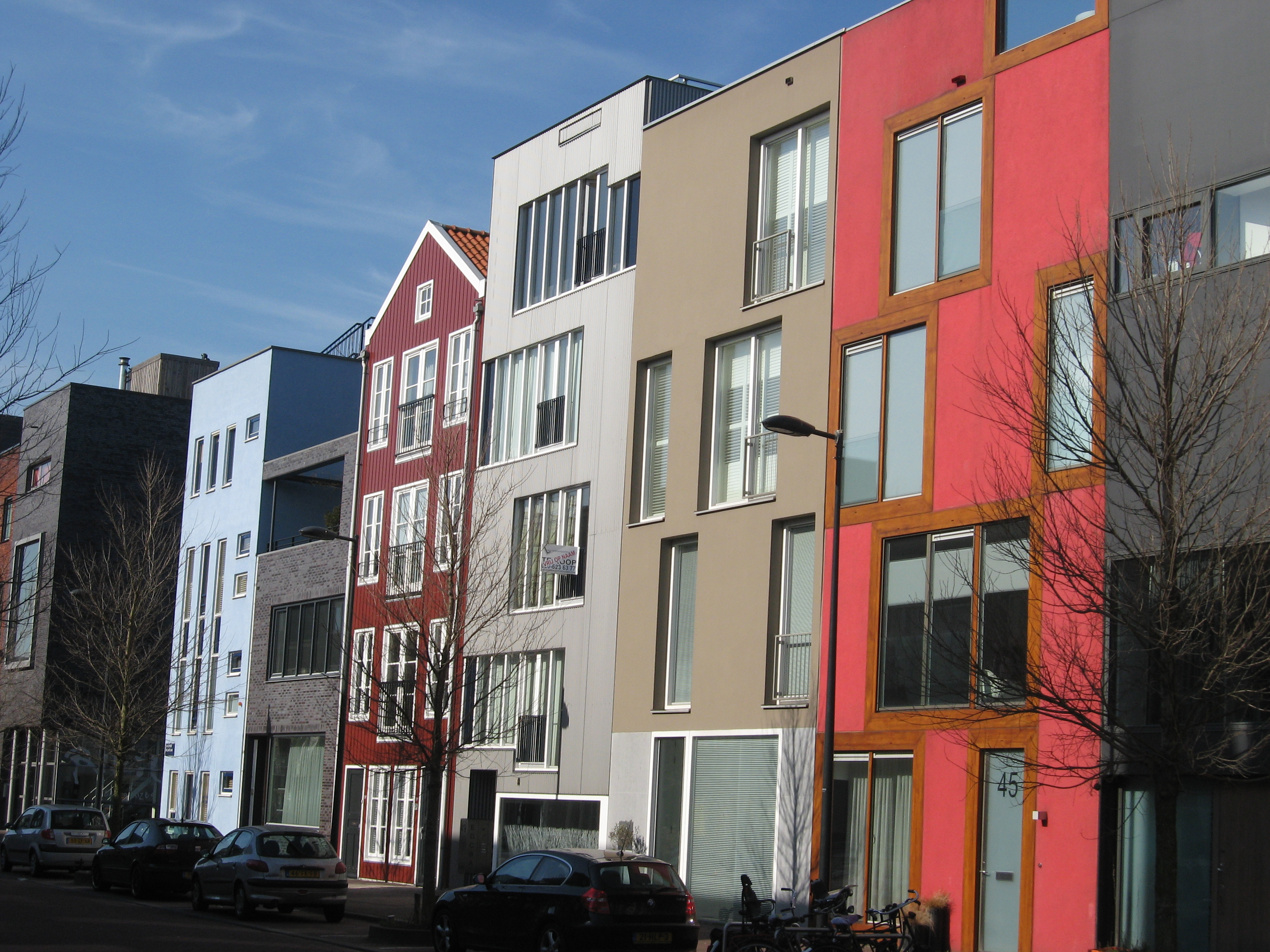
Houses in Jan Olphert Vaillantlaan on Steigereiland

The first residents moved into their houses on Rieteiland in Spring 2008. New groups of houses were built on Rieteiland. A temporary beach was also built on Strandeiland, the biggest of all the IJburg islands. The north-east part of the Haveneiland island is being extended to accommodate new buildings.

When complete, the IJburg neighbourhood will have 20,000 homes for 50,000 residents with schools, shops, leisure centres, restaurants and a beach and provide employment for 12,000 people.

== Geography ==
=== Islands ===
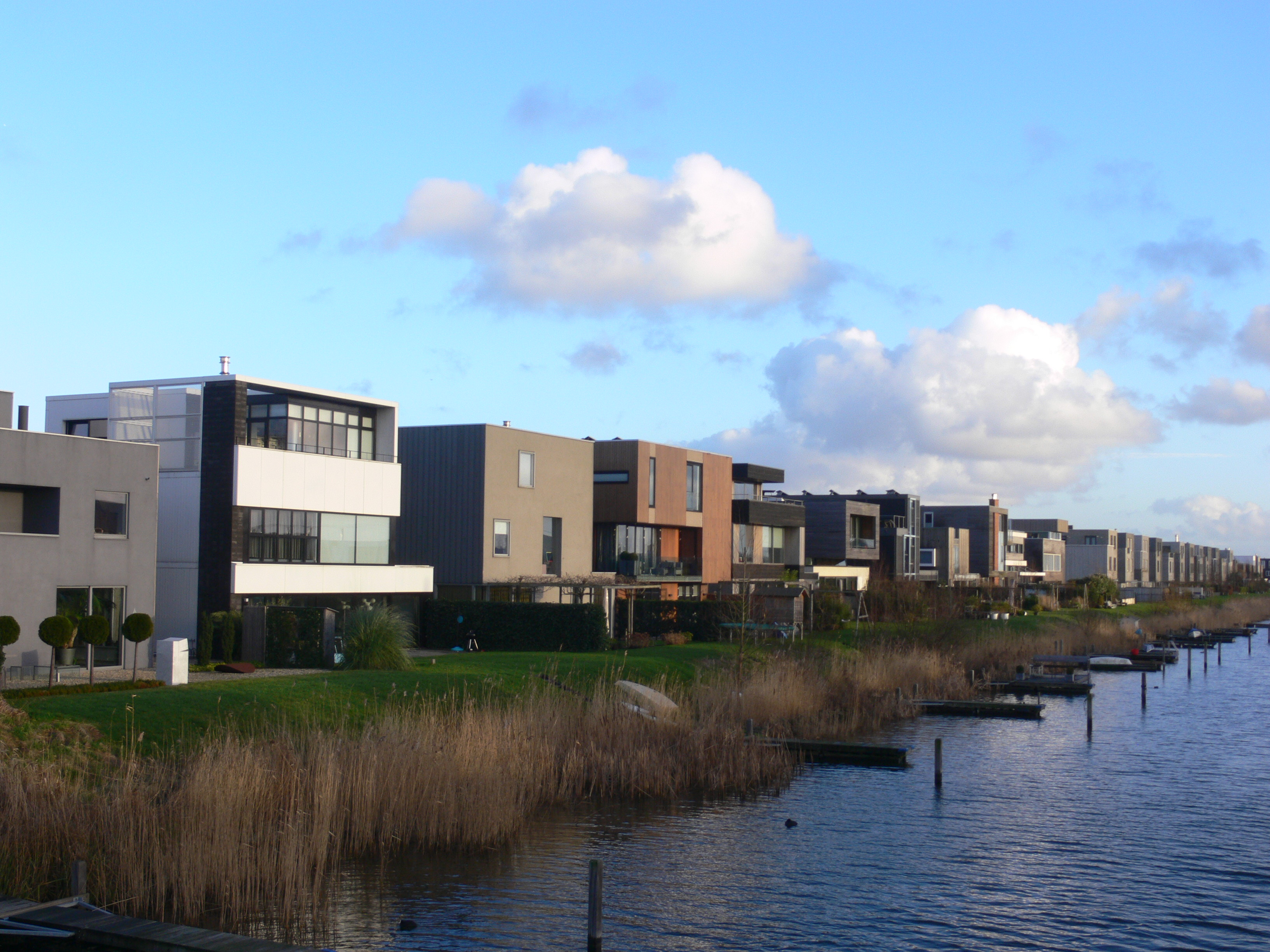
Individual houses in IJburg

IJburg consists of six artificial islands built in the IJmeer. They are Steigereiland (Jetty island), Haveneiland West and East (Marina island) and the three Rieteilanden (Reed islands), Large, Small and East. The construction of, and building on these six islands was Phase 1.

Three more islands are planned to be constructed during Phase 2. These islands will be called Centrumeiland (Centre island), Strandeiland (Beach island), and Buiteneiland (Outer island). Construction of these was temporarily delayed by a Superior Administrative Court decision to annul the building permit for Phase 2 due to lack of consideration for the local environment. However, as of 2020, building activities had restarted, and homes on Centrumeiland were under construction, while Strandeiland was being raised from the lake.

=== Parks and beach ===
A park is situated on Haveneiland, the Theo van Gogh park. A much larger park, the Diemerpark, was created parallel to the Rieteilanden and is connected by bridges. It has a small sandy beach on the lake, overlooking IJburg.

A larger sandy beach called Strand IJburg (IJburg Beach) was created on the western side of Strandeiland. There are plans to move this temporary beach and make it permanent.

=== Public transport ===
The islands are connected via a main thoroughfare, IJburglaan (IJburg Avenue), served by the IJtram (tram line 26) to Centraal Station. It is designed as a fast tram, with relatively widely-spaced stops, and is the only route in Amsterdam which carries non-folding bicycles (a maximum of two at a time). Demand has steadily risen as IJburg has grown, and peak frequency is now as high as 15 trams per hour. Headway is now at its minimum, since for safety reasons only one tram in each direction is allowed in the Piet Heintunnel at any one time. To increase capacity further, in 2020 GVB has converted to operation with pairs of trams coupled together. The bottleneck has also been eased by the introduction of bus service 66 which connects IJburg to Bijlmer ArenA via the only other road connection, the Benno Premselabrug at its southeastern end. A bicycle ferry between Zeeburgereiland and the Oostelijke Havengebied, numbered F9, opened in January 2023. Longer-term plans are under development to connect IJburg to the Indische Buurt by extending tram 3 or 14 from the Flevopark terminus, Proposals to build a metro line from Amsterdam to Almere via a tunnel under IJburg have also gained some political support.

=== Bridges ===
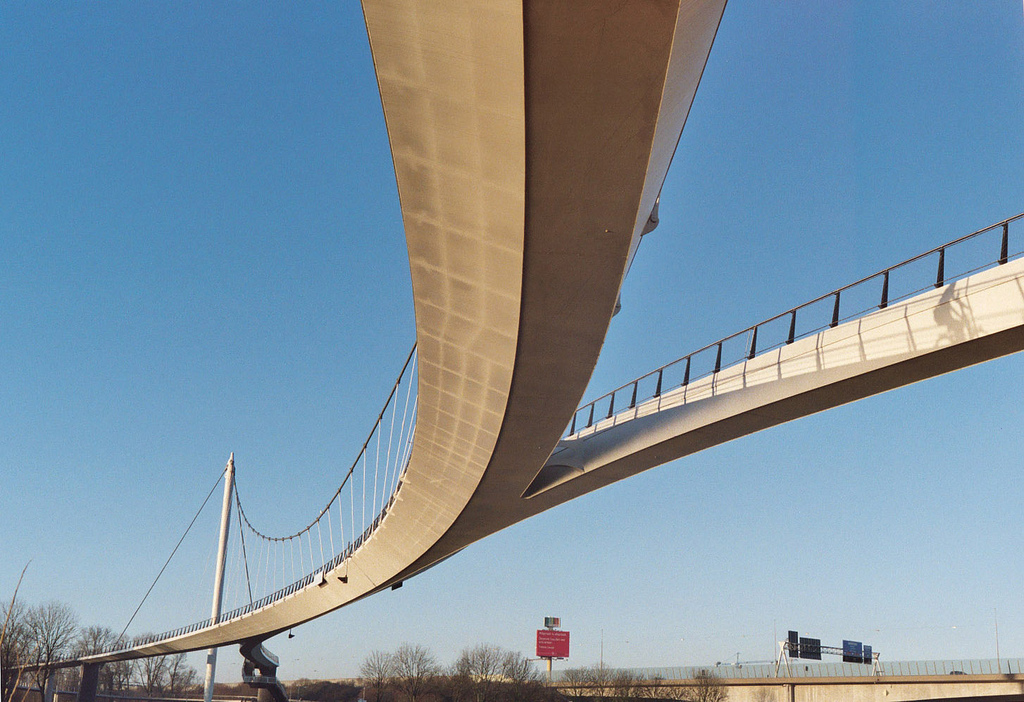
The Nescio Bridge, designed for pedestrians and cyclists only

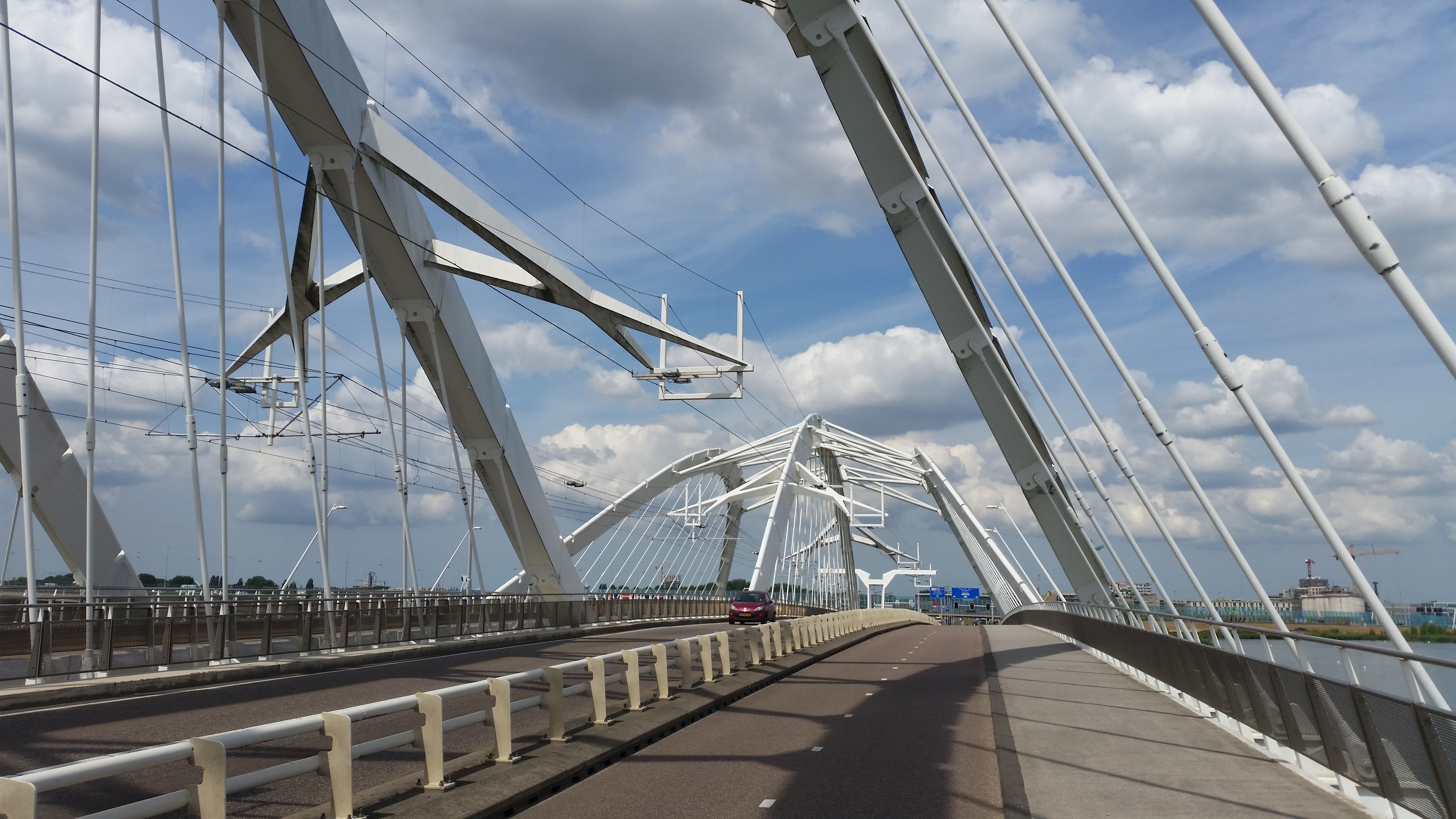
The Enneüs Heerma Bridge for cars, pedestrians, cyclists and tram traffic

Since IJburg is in the IJmeer, many bridges are required. The first bridge built was the Enneüs Heerma Bridge and connects Zeeburgereiland with Steigereiland. This bridge is the main route to IJburg and is also used by the tram. The bridge, designed by the English architect Nicholas Grimshaw was built in 2000 and with two spans of 75-metre (246 ft), is one of the biggest bridges in Amsterdam.

Bridge 2002 was designed by the same architect and is a smaller version of the Enneüs Heerma Bridge. This bridge connects Steigereiland to Haveneiland and is also used by the tram.

In 2004, the eastern end of IJburg was connected to Diemen by the Benno Premsela Bridge.

IJburg's pedestrians and cyclists also have their own bridge connecting them to the Ooster Ringdijk and Watergraafsmeer, called the Nescio Bridge, of which the southern end terminates in an expansive spiral cycle ramp. It is named after the writer Frits Grönloh, whose pen name was Nescio (Latin for "I do not know").
