= Milky Way Bridge =

Pedestrian/cycling bridge in Holland

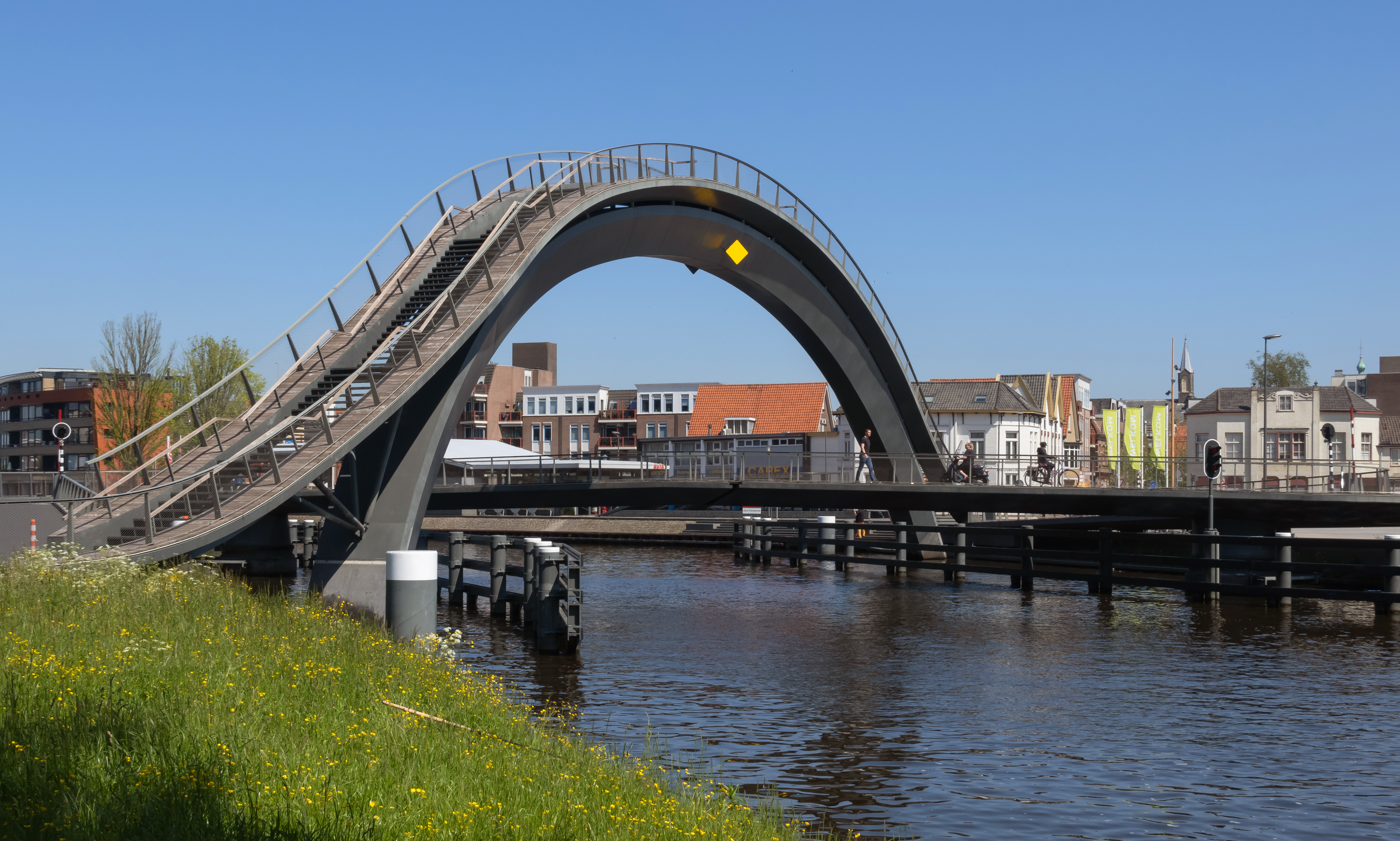
the Milky Way Bridge

The Milky Way Bridge, or Melkwegbrug, is a pedestrian/cycling bridge in Purmerend, Netherlands. It was designed by NEXT Architects and opened in 2006.

52.5073°N 4.9436°E
