= Amsterdam–Rhine Canal =

Canal in the Netherlands

Coordinates: 52°9′8″N 5°0′23″E

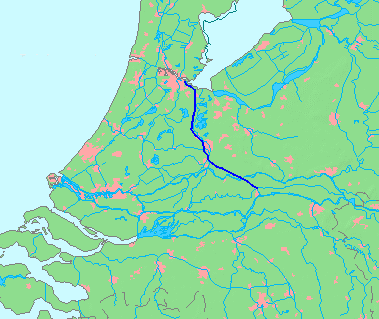
- Map of the Amsterdam–Rhine Canal
- Interactive map of Amsterdam–Rhine Canal

Specifications
- Length: 72 km (45 mi)

History
- Date completed: 1952

Geography
- Start point: Amsterdam, Netherlands
- End point: Waal river near Tiel, Netherlands

The Amsterdam–Rhine Canal (Dutch: Amsterdam-Rijnkanaal) is a canal in the Netherlands that was built to connect the port and capital city of Amsterdam to the main shipping artery of the Rhine. The canal is 72 km in length, over 100 meters wide and 6 meters deep. Its course follows a generally south-easterly direction as it goes through the city of Utrecht towards Wijk bij Duurstede where it intersects the Lek branch of the Rhine and then continues on to the river Waal near Tiel, with a branch, the Lek Canal, to the Lek near Nieuwegein. The canal is one of the busiest in the world. 91,495 vessels (including 5,541 recreational vessels) sailed through the canal in 2016, carrying a total of 77,172,454 tons of cargo.

== Construction ==
The Merwede Canal, which was the predecessor to the Amsterdam-Rhine Canal, ran from Amsterdam to Gorinchem. Excavation for the Merwede began in 1883 and by 1892 the canal was operational, however the volume of shipping traffic and the fact that ships had become larger, meant that the Merwede Canal was no longer suitable for its desired use. Seven different plans were produced to replace the Merwede Canal, from 1915 onward, until an eighth and final plan was created by a young (and later notorious) engineer employed by the provincial water board, Anton Mussert. The construction of the Amsterdam-Rhine Canal began in 1933. The canal between Utrecht and the Lek Canal was completed first in 1938. The northern part of the Amsterdam-Rhine, between Amsterdam to Douwe Egberts in Utrecht, ran through the widened bed of the old Merwede Canal, with the southern part being newly constructed past Houten and Wijk bij Duurstede to Tiel. The Second World War slowed work on the new canal, with it being officially opened by Queen Juliana on the 21 May 1952. As ships grew larger still, it was necessary to widen the canal. Work to do this was completed between 1965 and 1981. Planned construction work includes the widening of the Demka bend, for safety purposes, which is expected to complete in 2030.

== Bridges ==
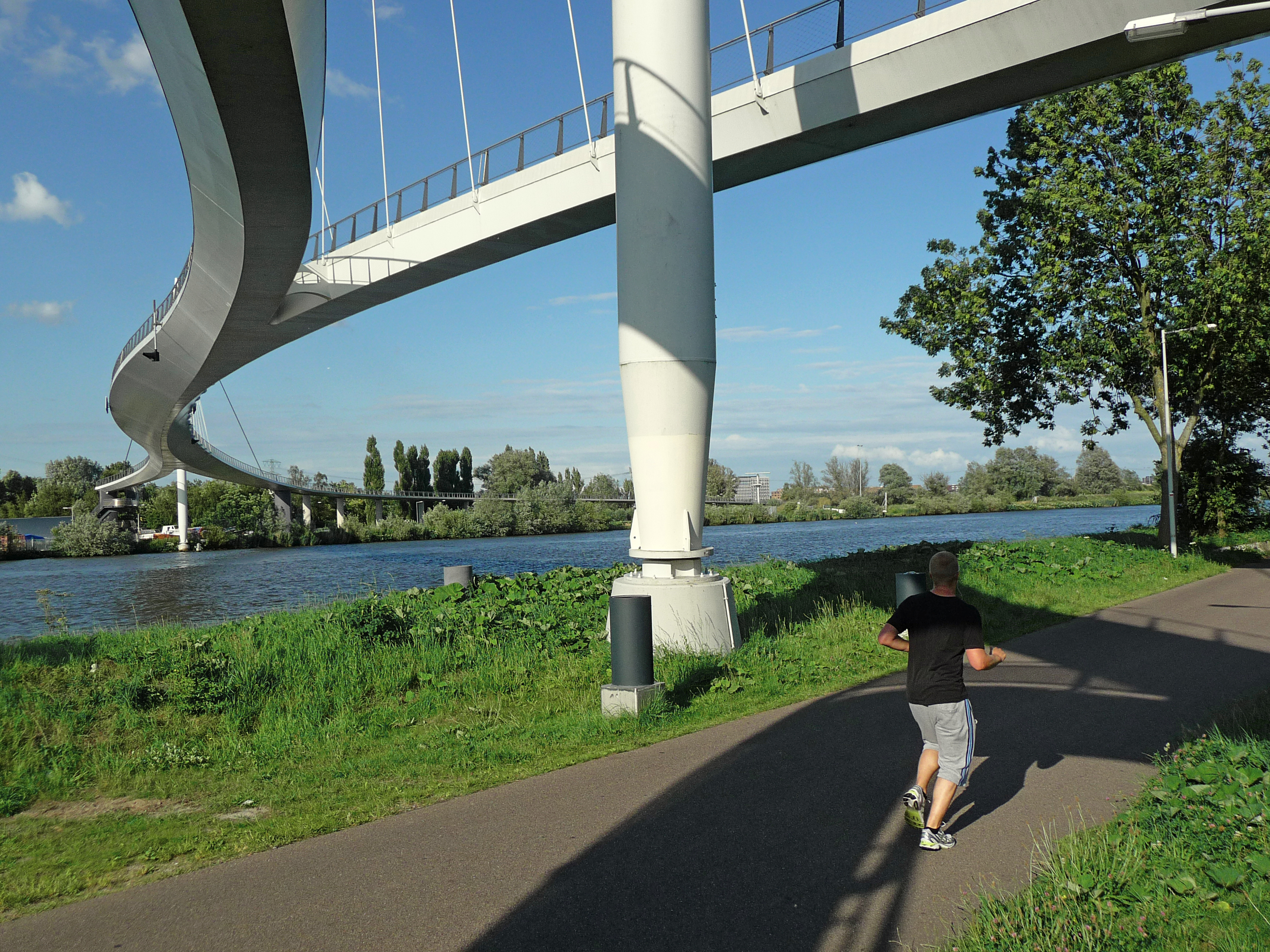
Nescio Bridge (2011)

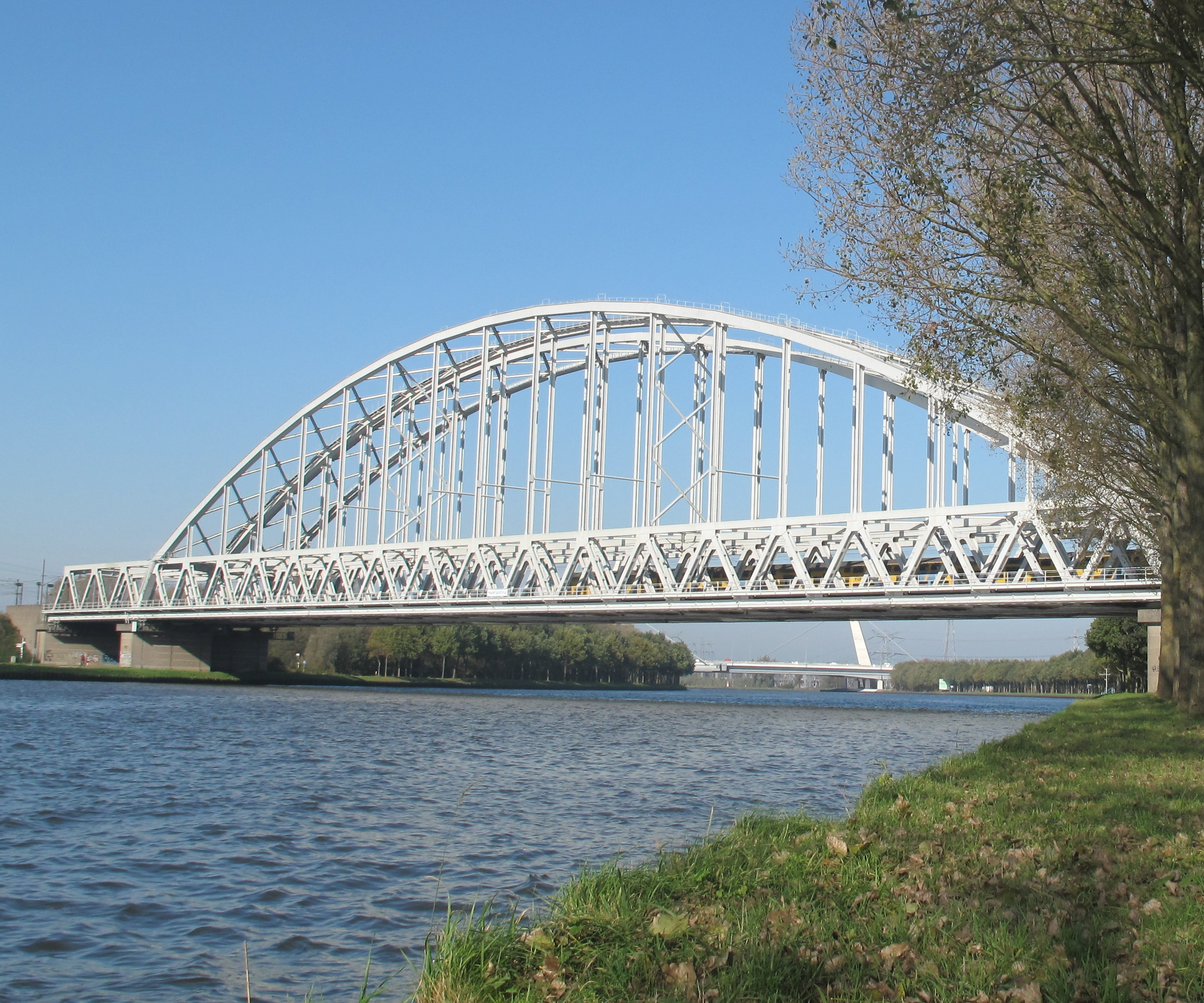
Muiderspoorbrug

There are a number of bridges over the canal, including:

- Amsterdam Bridge, a road traffic bridge that connects Zeeburgereiland with Zeeburgerdijk.
- Zeeburgerrug, a road traffic bridge that forms part of the Amsterdam Ring Road.
- Nescio Bridge, for cyclists and pedestrians, which is the longest cycle bridge in the Netherlands.
- Uyllander Bridge, that connects Diemen with Ijburg.
- Muider Bridge, which is part of the A1.
- Bethlem Bridge, that connects Amstelveen with Muiden.
- Muiderspoorbrug, for the Amsterdam-Zutphen railway line.
- Weesper Bridge, a road traffic bridge.
- Line Bridge, for cyclists and pedestrians.
- Loenerslootse Bridge, for road traffic that connects local roads in Loenersloot.
- Breukeler Bridge, for road traffic.
- Maarsser Bridge, which is also known as 'The High Bridge'.
- Demka Railway Bridge, which carries railway traffic on the Amsterdam-Arnhem railway line.
- Dafne Schippers Bridge for cyclists and pedestrians.
- Galecopper Bridge, that forms part of the Utrecht Ring Road.
- Schalkwijk Railway Bridge, carrying railway traffic on the Utrecht to Boxtel railway line.
- Princess Irene Locks, for road traffic that is part of the lock complex.
- Princess Marijke Lock Bridge, for road traffic that is located on the Prinses Marykesluisweg.
- Rooijenstein Bridge, for road traffic that connects roads in Zoelen.

== Temporary closures ==
=== Collision ===
On the 22 October 2010, there was a collision on the Amsterdam-Rhine Canal, involving a freight ship and a passenger boat. This resulted in shipping being stopped briefly.

=== Electrical cabling ===
Shipping was halted on the 17 February 2025, after electrical cables became entangled in a barge, resulting in two electrical cables carrying 150,000 volts falling into the water. Shipping was stopped to allow these to be safely removed.
