= Rieteilanden =

Neighborhood of Amsterdam in the Netherlands

Coordinates: 52°21′12″N 4°59′34″E

- Neighborhood of Amsterdam
- Interactive map of Rieteilanden
- Country: Netherlands
- Province: North Holland
- COROP: Amsterdam
- Time zone: UTC+1 (CET)

Rieteilanden (Dutch pronunciation: [ˈrit.ɛiˌlɑndə(n)]) is a neighborhood of Amsterdam, Netherlands.
