= Zeeburgereiland =

- Neighborhood of Amsterdam
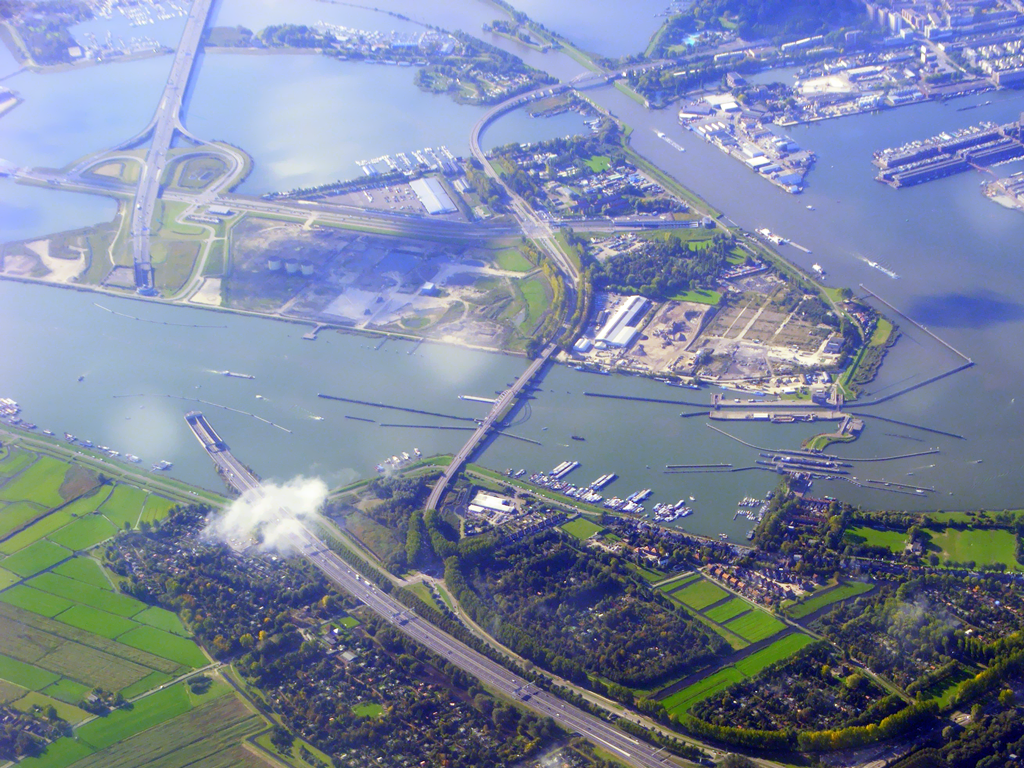
- Zeeburgereiland
- Interactive map of Zeeburgereiland
- Coordinates: 52°22′N 4°58′E
- Country: Netherlands
- Province: North Holland
- COROP: Amsterdam
- Time zone: CET (UTC+01)
  - Summer (DST): CEST (UTC+02)

The Zeeburgereiland is a triangular island on the east side of Amsterdam, in the Dutch province of North Holland. It lies between the Oranje Locks and the Diemerzeedijk and on the east is bordered by the IJ. Formerly an industrial area, the island is being redeveloped as part of the IJburg new neighbourhood. It is crossed by the A10 motorway and, since 2005, the IJ Tram line of the Amsterdam Tram system.
