= European route E22 in the Netherlands =

European route E 22
- Europese weg E22
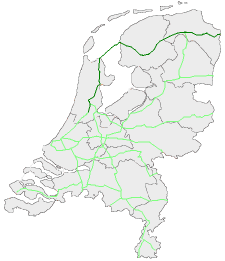
- European routes in the Netherlands with E 22 in dark green

Route information
- Maintained by Rijkswaterstaat
- Length: 249 km (155 mi)
- Existed: 16 September 1950–present

Major junctions
- West end: E19 / A 4 / A 10 in Amsterdam
- A 5 in Amsterdam; E35 / A 10 in Amsterdam; A 7 / A 8 in Zaandam; N 31 near Zurich; A 6 in Joure; A 32 in Heerenveen; N 31 in Drachten; A 28 in Groningen; N 33 near Zuidbroek
- East end: E22 / A 280 at Germany border

Location
- Country: Kingdom of the Netherlands
- Constituent country: Netherlands
- Provinces: North Holland, Friesland, Groningen

Highway system
- International E-road network; A Class; B Class
← E19	→ E25

European route E 22 (E 22) is a west–east European route, running from Holyhead in the United Kingdom, through the Netherlands, Germany, Sweden and Latvia, to Ishim in Russia.

The highway is maintained by Rijkswaterstaat.

== Route description ==
In the Netherlands, E 22 starts in southwestern Amsterdam at De Nieuwe Meer Interchange where A4 starts its course and branches off from the A10, the ring road around Amsterdam. E 22 runs north concurrent with Ring A10. After a few exits A5 joins E 22/A10 just before E 22/A10, concurrent, pass under the North Sea Canal using a group of tunnels called the first and second Coen Tunnel. Through the Coen Tunnels, E 22/A10/ have extra lanes only used in rush hour. Shortly after they get to Coenplein-Noord Interchange, where Ring A10 continues east and E 22 branches of to the northwest, now concurrent with A8. After the first and only exit of the section where E 22 and A8 run concurrently, A8 has extra lanes used in rush hour only, these extra rush hour lanes are also present on the next road, A7, until Purmerend, that crosses A8 at Zaandam Interchange, and that E 22 starts running concurrently with from there on to the northeast. From Purmerend, the E 22/A7 runs about 50 kilometres (31 mi) north, passing by Hoorn and Medemblik, until it reaches Den Oever, where the southwestern end of the Afsluitdijk is located. E 22/A7 continues over the Afslutidijk for about 30 kilometres (19 mi) with no exits, with the Wadden Sea on the left and the IJsselmeer on the right. After running over the Afsluitdijk, the road continues to the southeast, passing by Bolsward and Sneek until it reaches the town of Joure. In Sneek though, A7 turns into N7 to function as the southern part of the ring road around Sneek, with a lowered speed limit. In Joure, A6 joins E 22/A7 from the south on a traffic circle which also functions as an exit allowing traffic from Joure to enter the motorway. It is the last traffic circle in the Netherlands on a motorway with no grade separated ramps, though it will be upgraded from 2015 to 2017 to half a stack interchange.

From Joure E 22/A7 continues to the north east, passing by Heerenveen and Drachten, where near both cities it crosses A32 and N31 respectively, both of the interchanges are built as cloverleaf interchanges. After passing by Drachten, the road continues to Groningen, where it touches the border between the Groningen and Drenthe provinces, but doesn't enter Drenthe. In Groningen, A7 becomes N7 and functions as the southern part of the ring road around Groningen, and is designed as freeway with some at grade intersections, and traffic lights at Julianaplein Interchange, where E 232/A28 arrives from the south and has its northern terminus here in Groningen. N7 continues running to the east in Groningen until it reaches N46 at Interchange Euvelgunne, where you have to make a right to stay on E 22/N7 going to the southeast. From here on, it is only about 40 kilometres (25 mi) to the German border. Before that, it passes by Hoogezand-Sappemeer and Winschoten, and between the two it crosses N33 at a partial cloverleaf interchange. Continuing east it finally arrives at the town of Nieuweschans, located at the Dutch side of the border. This is the eastern terminus of A7, and E 22 continues east in Germany, here concurrent with the German A280.

== History ==
=== European route alignment history ===
- In 1950, when the e-roads were first aligned, part of E10 and part of E35 followed the current alignment of E22 in the Netherlands. E10 from Amsterdam to Groningen, though in Friesland following N31 / A31 instead of N7 / A7 as E22 does nowadays. And E35 from Groningen to the German border. E22, back then, ran from Berlin in Germany to Przemysl in the USSR.
- In 1954, E10, originally running from Paris, through Brussels, Antwerpen, Breda, Rotterdam, Amsterdam, Leeuwarden and Groningen, now had its Northern terminus in Amsterdam and thereby no longer followed any section of the current E22 in the Netherlands.
- In 1963, E10 was back to its 1950 alignment, putting its northern terminus back in Groningen and following the current alignment of E22.
- In 1975, E22 was realigned from its route that it followed then, from Germany to the USSR, to its current alignment from Amsterdam to the German border east of Groningen (the part in the Netherlands). E10, the road that used to follow E22's current alignment was no longer in use (it would be used in a few years, but not on E22's current alignment). E35 was realigned to a totally different course from Hook of Holland to Arnhem in the Netherlands (and to Cologne, Frankfurt am Main, Basel and Rome beyond that).

=== Dutch underlying road construction history ===
In 1950, when E10 and E35 followed the course of current E22, most of the underlying road wasn't constructed yet. There were only the N7 from Hoorn-Noord to Lambertschaag, from Middenmeer in North Holland to Bolsward in Friesland over the Afsluitdijk, from Sneek to Heerenveen and from Sappemeer to Scheemda, and the provincial road S14 from Zaandijk to Purmerend-Zuid, all with at grade intersections and one lane in each direction.

==== In North Holland ====
From 1966 to 1975, motorway A10, the ring road around Amsterdam was constructed with grade separated intersections and mostly three lanes in each direction between E22's western terminus in the Netherlands at Interchange De Nieuwe Meer and Interchange Coenplein (now known as Interchange Coenplein-Noord), where E22 will stop following A10 and starts running over A8's alignment to the northwest. Between 1966 and 1968 A8, the road E22 runs concurrently with between Amsterdam and Zaandam, was constructed with grade separated intersections and two lanes in each direction. In 1959, a missing link between two parts of N7 was constructed, from Lambertschaag to Middenmeer, with at grade intersections and one lane in each direction. Between 1976 and 1982, the last missing link in N7/A7 in North Holland was constructed as A7, in parts, between Purmerend-Zuid and Hoorn-Noord, with grade separated intersections and two lanes in each direction. By 1985, the entire road from Interchange Zaandam to Zurich, east of the Afsluitdijk, the part of N7/A7 in North Holland, was upgraded to A7 with grade separated intersections and two lanes in each direction.

Between 2007 and 2014, a second tunnel, the second Coentunnel, under the IJ was constructed, widening A10 here to three lanes in each direction with two additional reversible lanes to help traffic flow in rush hour.

A8 between Coenplein Interchange and Zaandam Interchange was widened to three lanes in each direction in 1990, and then widened again to four lanes in each direction in 2013. In 2015, a fifth southbound lane was added between Zaandam Interchange and Coenplein Interchange, and northbound between a gas station just north of exit Oostzaan and Zaandam Interchange, which are narrower and only opened in rush hour.

==== Between Zurich and Joure ====
In Friesland, N7 was extended east beyond Bolsward to Nijland as A7 with grade separated intersections and two lanes in each direction. Between 1972 and 1978, all of N7 between Zurich and Joure Interchange was opened and/or upgraded to A7 with grade separated intersections and two lanes in each direction, except for the section that was the southern part of the ring road around Sneek, which remained N7 with a much lower maximum speed, though with grade separated intersections as well. The part of N7 that functions as the ring road around Sneek was upgraded again between 2008 and 2010, and now has two lanes in each direction.

==== Between Joure and the German border ====
Between 1956 and 1960, N7 was extended east from Heerenveen to Groningen, and the part between Sappemeer and Scheemda was also extended in both directions between 1955 and 1957 and would then run between Hoogezand and Winschoten, all with at grade intersections and one lane in each direction. In 1969 N7 was opened between Winschoten and the German border near Nieuweschans with grade separated intersections and one lane in each direction. Between 1972 and 1973, the missing link between Groningen and Hoogezand was opened as A7 with grade separated intersections and two lanes in each direction, though with a slightly different course through Groningen than it has nowadays, it used to go over the Europaweg, until Euvelgunne Interchange was opened in 2009. Between 1972 and 1983, N7 between Heerenveen and western Groningen was upgraded to A7 with grade separated intersections and two lanes in each direction. Between 1988 and 1993, N7 between Hoogezand and the German border was upgraded to A7 with grade separated intersections and two lanes in each direction. It was also then realigned to go north of Scheemda instead of through it. In 2009, as before mentioned, Euvelgunne Interchange was opened, and N7 would now approach this interchange from the west and then go south to Engelbert, with two lanes in each direction, grade separated intersections, but a lowered speed, meaning it would still be called N7.

== Future ==
Owing to increasing numbers of commuters, a number of upgrades will be seen before 2030 from the western terminus of E22, where it is concurrent with A10, to the city of Purmerend, comprising the roads A10, A8 and A7. The Coentunnels currently only use 8 of their 10 lanes, when A7 and A8 will be upgraded, all lanes in the Coentunnel might have to be used to funnel through all the extra traffic. A8 will see an upgrade to six lanes in each direction between Coenplein Interchange and Zaandam interchange. Between Zaandam Interchange and exit Purmerend Zuid, A7 will be upgraded from its current two lanes in each direction to four lanes in each direction. Money for the project is already reserved by the Dutch government and will be available in 2023.

Interchange Joure, where A6 meets E22, that is concurrent with A7 there, is currently build as a traffic circle. It has no grade separated parts which results in some traffic being favoured over other traffic. This is why a new interchange is being constructed between 2015 and 2017, which will be half a stack interchange. It will be placed southwest of the current traffic circle and traffic from A6 from the south will get onto A7 without having to use an exit, thus being the dominant route. When arriving from the west on A7/E22, this means you have to use ramps to stay on A7/E22. A new exit, Joure, will be created just south of where the current traffic circle is now, since an exit used to be incorporated in the traffic circle.

== Exit list ==
Province	Municipality	km	mi	Exit	Name	Destinations	Notes
North Holland	Amsterdam			—	De Nieuwe Meer Interchange	E19 / A 4 west / A 10 east – Rotterdam, The Hague, Utrecht, Hengelo	No connection to E 22 in the United Kingdom; south end of A10 overlap
North Holland	Amsterdam			7	Amsterdam-Slotervaart	S 107 (Henk Sneevlietweg) – Amsterdam-Slotervaart	
North Holland	Amsterdam			6	Osdorp	S 106 (Cornelis Lelylaan) – Osdorp	
North Holland	Amsterdam			5	Amsterdam-Geuzenveld	S 105 (Jan van Galenstraat) – Slotermeer, Geuzenveld, De Baarsjes	
North Holland	Amsterdam			4	Amsterdam-Bos en Lommer	S 104 (Bos en Lommerplein) – Bos en Lommer, Slotermeer	
North Holland	Amsterdam			3	Westerpark	S 103 (Haarlemmerweg) / N 200 west (Haarlemmerweg) – Haarlem, Bos en Lommer, Westerpark	Northbound exit and southbound entrance only
North Holland	Amsterdam			2	Amsterdam-Sloterdijk	S 102 (Basisweg / Transformatorweg) – Amsterdam-Sloterdijk, Amsterdam-Centrum, Haarlem	
North Holland	Amsterdam			1	Amsterdam-Hemhavens	N 203 / S 101 – Rotterdam, Zaandam	
North Holland	Amsterdam			—	Coenplein-Zuid Interchange	A 5 – Rotterdam, Haarlem	Northbound entrance and southbound exit only
North Holland	Amsterdam			—	Coenplein-Noord Interchange	E35 west / A 10 west – Utrecht, Amersfoort, Volendam	North end of A10 overlap; south end of A8 overlap
North Holland	Oostzaan			1	Oostzaan	N 516 (Kolkweg) / S 118 south (Verlengde Stellingweg) – Zaanstad, Oostzaan	
North Holland	Zaanstad			—	Zaandam Interchange	A 7 west / A 8 north – Alkmaar, Beverwijk, Zaanstad	North end of A8 overlap; west end of A7 overlap
North Holland	Wormerland			2	Zaandijk	N 515 west (Leeghwaterweg) / S 153 west (Leeghwaterweg) – Zaandijk	
North Holland	Wormerland			3	Wijdewormer	Oosterdwarsweg	
North Holland	Purmerend			4	Purmerend-Zuid	N 235 (Laan der Continenten) – Purmerend-Zuid, Ilpendam	
North Holland	Purmerend			5	Purmerend	N 235 east (Zuiddijk) / Zuiddijk – Purmerend, Zuidoostbeemster, Oosthuizen	
North Holland	Purmerend			6	Purmerend-Noord	N 244 – Purmerend-Noord, Middenbeemster, Alkmaar, Volendam	
North Holland	Koggenland			7	Avenhorn	N 243 west / N 247 south – Avenhorn, Heerhugowaard, Hoorn-West, Zuid-Scharwoude	
North Holland	Hoorn			8	Hoorn	Provincialeweg	
North Holland	Hoorn			9	Hoorn-Noord	N 302 east (Westfrisiaweg) – Hoorn-Noord, Enkhuizen, Lelystad	
North Holland	Medemblik			10	Wognum	N 241 west (A.C. de Graafweg) / Tender – Wognum, Nibbixwoud, Benningbroek, Opmeer, Schagen	
North Holland	Medemblik			10a	Abbekerk	Tuinstraat / Broerdijk / Reigerweg	
North Holland	Medemblik			11	Medemblik	N 239 (Dijkweg) – Medemblik, Opperdoes, Lambertschaag	
North Holland	Wieringermeer			12	Middenmeer	N 242 west (Alkmaarseweg) – Middenmeer, Schagen	
North Holland	Wieringermeer			13	Wieringerwerf	N 240 (Westerterpweg / Oosterterpweg) / Havenweg – Wieringerwerf, Slootdorp	
North Holland	Wieringen			14	Den Oever	N 99 west (Rijksstraatweg) / Stontelerweg – Den Helder, Den Oever	
IJsselmeer / Wadden Sea				Afsluitdijk			
Friesland	Súdwest Fryslân			—	Zurich Interchange	N 31 north – Harlingen, Leeuwarden	
Friesland	Súdwest Fryslân			15	Zurich	Houwdijk / Viaduct	
Friesland	Súdwest Fryslân			16	Witmarsum	Weersterweg / Van Aylvaweg	
Friesland	Súdwest Fryslân			17	Bolsward	N 359 (Sudergoawei) / Oude Rijksweg – Bolsward, Workum	
Friesland	Súdwest Fryslân			18	Bolsward-Oost	Kloosterlaan	
Friesland	Súdwest Fryslân			19	Nijland	Tsjaerddyk / Hottingawei	
Friesland	Súdwest Fryslân			—	—	—	West end of N7 road designation
Friesland	Súdwest Fryslân			20	IJlst	State As	
Friesland	Súdwest Fryslân			21	Sneek-Centrum	N 354 south (Lemmerweg) / Lemmerweg – Sneek-Centrum, Hommerts, Woudsend	
Friesland	Súdwest Fryslân			21a	Industrie Woudvaart	Akkenwinde / Selfhelpweg	Westbound exit and eastbound entrance only
Friesland	Súdwest Fryslân			22	Sneek-Oost	N 354 north / Oppenhuizerweg / Lorentzstraat / Burgemeester Rasterhofflaan – Sneek-Oost, Oppenhuizen, Leeuwarden	
Friesland	Súdwest Fryslân			—	—	—	East end of N7 road designation
Friesland	Skarsterlân			23	Joure-West	Woudfennen	
Friesland	Skarsterlân			—	Joure Interchange	A 6 south / Geert Knolweg – Lemmer, Emmeloord	
Friesland	Skarsterlân			24	Joure	Geert Knolweg	
Friesland	Skarsterlân			25	Oudehakse	De Dolten / Nije Fjildwei	
Friesland	Heerenveen			26	Heerenveen-West	Wetterwille / Weinmakker / Nije Fjildwei	Westbound exit and eastbound entrance only
Friesland	Heerenveen			—	Heerenveen Interchange	A 32 – Heerenveen, Zwolle, Leeuwarden	
Friesland	Heerenveen			26a	Tjalleberd	Zestienroeden / Pastoriesingel	
Friesland	Opsterland			27	Tijnje	N 392 (Koaibosk) – Tijnje, Gorredijk	
Friesland	Opsterland			28	Beetsterzwaag	Beetsterweg	
Friesland	Smallingerland			29	Drachten-Centrum	Zuiderhogeweg	
Friesland	Smallingerland			30	Oosterwolde	N 381 south – Oosterwolde, Ureterp	
Friesland	Smallingerland			30a	Drachten	N 31 north – Drachten, Burgum, Dokkum, Leeuwarden	
Friesland	Opsterland			31	Frieschepalen	N 358 north (De Scheiding) / De Scheiding – Frieschepalen, Surhuisterveen, Buitenpost	
Groningen	Marum			32	Marum	N 980 north (Noorderweg) / Noorderweg / Noorderringweg / Parallelweg – Marum, Kornhorn, Grootegast	
Groningen	Marum			33	Boerakker	N 388 north (Boerakkerweg) / Boerakkerweg – Boerakker, Zuidhorn, Grijpskerk, Tolbert	
Groningen	Leek, Netherlands			34	Leek	N 372 south (Oude Postweg) / N 978 north (Oude Postweg) / Pasop / Blinkweg / Lage Traan / Kapteynlaan – Leek, Roden	
Groningen	Groningen			34a	Industrie Westpoort	Westpoortboulevard / Matsloot	
Groningen	Groningen			35	Hoogkerk	N 372 south (Ruskenveen) / Zuiderweg / Roderwolderdijk – Hoogkerk, Peize	
Groningen	Groningen			—	—	—	West end of N7 road designation
Groningen	Groningen			36	Ring Groningen-West	N 370 north (Laan 1940-1945) / Jan Evert Scholtenlaan / Laan Corpus Den Hoorn / Paterswoldseweg / Muntinglaan – Groningen-West, Groningen-Centrum, Winsum, Zuidhorn	
Groningen	Groningen			36a	Groningen-Stadspark	N 370 north – Groningen-Corpus den Hoorn	Westbound exit only
Groningen	Groningen			—	Julianaplein Interchange	E232 south (Julianaweg) / A 28 / Emmaviaduct / Hoornsediep – Utrecht, Assen, Emmen	
Groningen	Groningen			37	Groningen-Helpman	Hereweg	
Groningen	Groningen			37a	Groningen-Oosterpoort	Meeuwerderbaan / Europaweg / Winschoterdiep	Westbound entrance and eastbound exit only
Groningen	Groningen			38	Groningen-Zuidoost	Europaweg / Bergenweg / Lübeckweg / Osloweg / Euvelgunnebrug / Gotenburgweg / Kieler Bocht / Skagerrak	
Groningen	Groningen			—	Euvelgunne Interchange	N 46 north (Beneluxweg) – Eemshaven, Winsum, Bedum, Delfzijl	
Groningen	Groningen			39	Westerbroek	Europaweg	
Groningen	Groningen			—	—	—	East end of N7 road designation
Groningen	Hoogezand-Sappemeer			40	Foxhol	N 386 south (Rengerslaan) / Rengerslaan / A.B. Nobellaan – Foxhol, Harkstede	
Groningen	Hoogezand-Sappemeer			41	Hoogezand	N 385 south (Kerkstraat) / N 387 north (Provinciale Weg) / Rijksweg West / Rijksweg Oost / Knijpslaan – Hoogezand, Slochteren	
Groningen	Hoogezand-Sappemeer			42	Sappemeer	Noordbroeksterstraat / Rijksweg oost	
Groningen	Menterwolde			43	Zuidbroek	Kerkstraat / Europaweg / Burgemeester Omtaweg	
Groningen	Menterwolde			—	Zuidbroek Interchange	N 33 – Zwolle, Assen, Veendam, Eemshaven, Delfzijl	
Groningen	Oldambt			45	Scheemda	N 362 north (Rijksweg) / Rijksweg – Scheemda, Midwolda, [[Oostwold|Oostwold]]	
Groningen	Oldambt			46	Heiligerlee	N 964 south – Heiligerlee, Winschoten-West	
Groningen	Oldambt			47	Winschoten	N 367 south (Oostereinde) / N 966 north (Oostereinde) / N 967 north (Nieuweweg) – Winschoten, Pekela, Beerta	
Groningen	Oldambt			48	Oudeschans	Ulsda / Ulsderweg / Heeresloot	
Groningen	Oldambt			49	Nieuweschans	Hamdijk	
Groningen	Reiderland			—	—	E22 east / A 280 east	Continuation into Germany; east end of A7 overlap
1.000 mi = 1.609 km; 1.000 km = 0.621 mi: Concurrency terminus; Incomplete access; Route transition; Unopened

== See also ==
European route E22
Previous country: United Kingdom	Netherlands	Next country: Germany
