= Vestingmuseum Oudeschans =

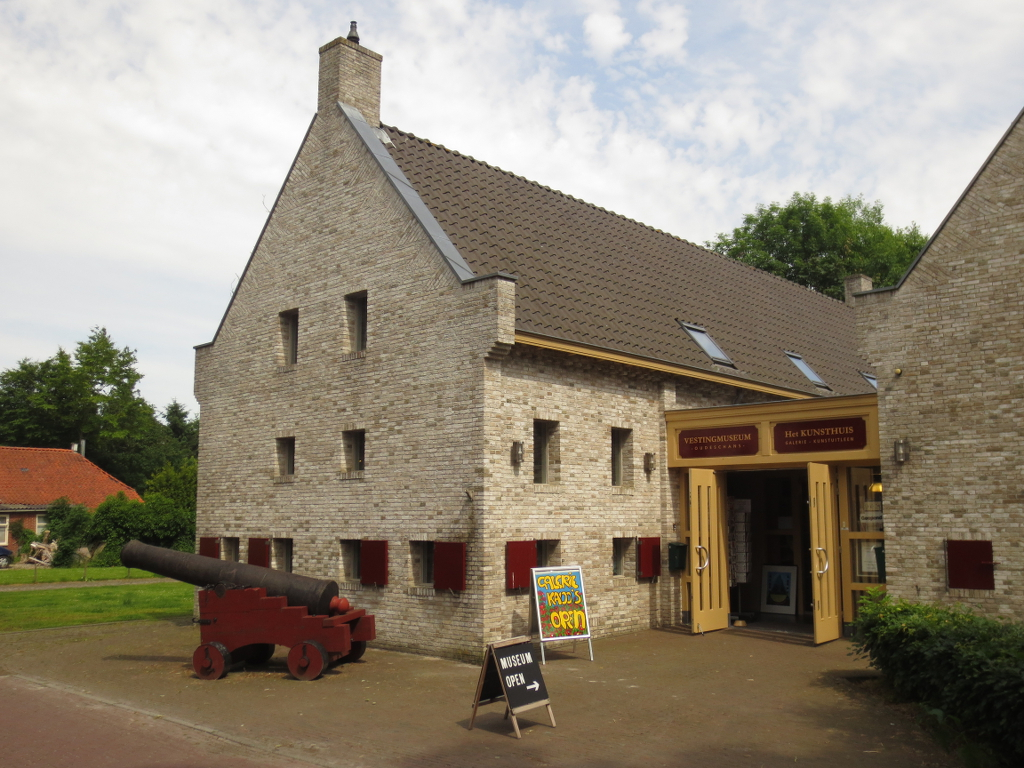
- Museum building in 2014

- Location in Groningen in the Netherlands
- Established: 12 September 1987
- Location: Molenweg 6 Oudeschans, Netherlands
- Coordinates: 53.1385°N 7.1407°E
- Type: Local museum History museum
- Visitors: 1,195 (2015)
- Public transit access: Voorstraat; Bus line: 811
- Website: vesting-oudeschans.nl

Vestingmuseum Oudeschans (Dutch pronunciation: [ˈvɛstɪŋmyˌzeːjʏm ˈʌudəˌsxɑns]; English: Oudeschans Fortification Museum) is a local museum in the village of Oudeschans in the Netherlands. The museum showcases the history of the 16th-century fortification of Oudeschans and has a collection of archaeological findings.

The museum opened on 12 September 1987. The building was renovated in 2009. The museum lost its structural municipal subsidy in 2010. The museum staff consists of volunteers only. With 1,195 visitors in 2015, it is one of the lesser-visited museums in Groningen.

== Location ==
The museum is located at the Molenweg in the village Oudeschans in the municipality Bellingwedde in the east of the province Groningen near the Dutch–German border.

The Bellingwolderschans (Sconce of Bellingwolde) was a fortification created in 1593 by William Louis, Count of Nassau-Dillenburg during the Eighty Years' War. It was renamed Oudeschans (Old Sconce) after the construction of the nearby Nieuweschans (New Sconce) in 1628. Oudeschans was used for military purposes until 1814. In the 1980s, the fortification was partially reconstructed. In 1991, the fortification became a state protected village area (Dutch: beschermd dorpsgezicht).

== History ==
The museum was opened on 12 September 1987.

In 2009, the museum building underwent a major renovation.

== Exhibitions ==
The museum shows the history of the fortification of Oudeschans and of other fortifications in the area.

On display in the museum are archaeological findings from the 17th and 18th century, such as pottery, household objects, shoes, weapons, and ammunition. There are information panels and a video presentation in Dutch and German.

The museum also has temporary exhibitions.

== Administration ==
| Year | Visitors | Year | Visitors |
|---|---|---|---|
| 2003 | 3,000 | 2010 | 1,500 |
| 2004 | 1,500 | 2011 | 750 |
| 2005 | 1,500 | 2012 | 800 |
| 2006 | N/A | 2013 | 1,200 |
| 2007 | 1,500 | 2014 | 1,100 |
| 2008 | 1,000 | 2015 | 1,195 |
| 2009 | N/A | | |

The museum staff and board consist of only volunteers. The museum receives an annual subsidy of around 1000 euro of the municipality.

Vestingmuseum Oudeschans is one of the lesser-visited museums in the province of Groningen. In the years 2010 to 2015, the museum had 750 to 1,500 visitors per year.

The museum is a member of Museumhuis Groningen (Groningen Museum House), an umbrella organization for museums and heritage institutions in the province of Groningen.
