= A7 motorway (Netherlands) =

Motorway in the Netherlands

A7 motorway
- Rijksweg 7
- Location of the A7 motorway

Route information
- Part of E22

Major junctions
- West end: A8 in Zaandam
- East end: Bad Nieuweschans; A 280 border with Germany

Location
- Country: Kingdom of the Netherlands
- Constituent country: Netherlands

Highway system
- Roads in the Netherlands; Motorways; E-roads; Provincial; City routes

The A7 motorway is a motorway in the Netherlands connecting Zaandam, via the Afsluitdijk, Sneek and Groningen to the German border near Bad Nieuweschans. The entire road is part of the European route E22, with exception of the first kilometer, between the terminus in Zaandam and the interchange Zaandam. The total length is 236 km, making it the longest motorway in the country.

== Motorway interruptions ==
The motorway A7 is interrupted twice:

- Around Sneek, the road is demoted to a highway for several kilometers, and includes some at-grade intersections The at-grade intersections were replaced with grade-separated intersections in 2008–2010. However, it isn't a motorway.
- Also, around the city of Groningen, it is demoted over a distance of several kilometers, mainly for the at-grade intersection with motorway A28, and for the road's small alignment through the city in general.

Both of the abovementioned sections are denoted as N7 to distinguish those parts from the motorway, for which the A designation is used in the Netherlands. The A7 together with the N7 is called the Rijksweg 7.

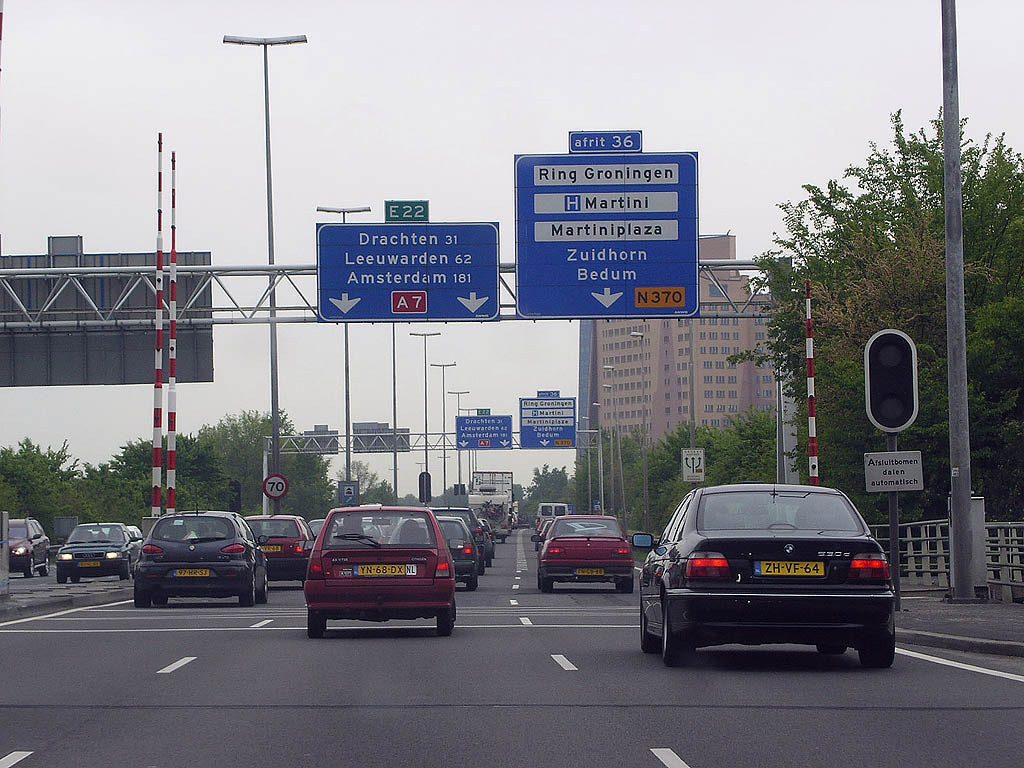
Westbound N7 near Groningen.

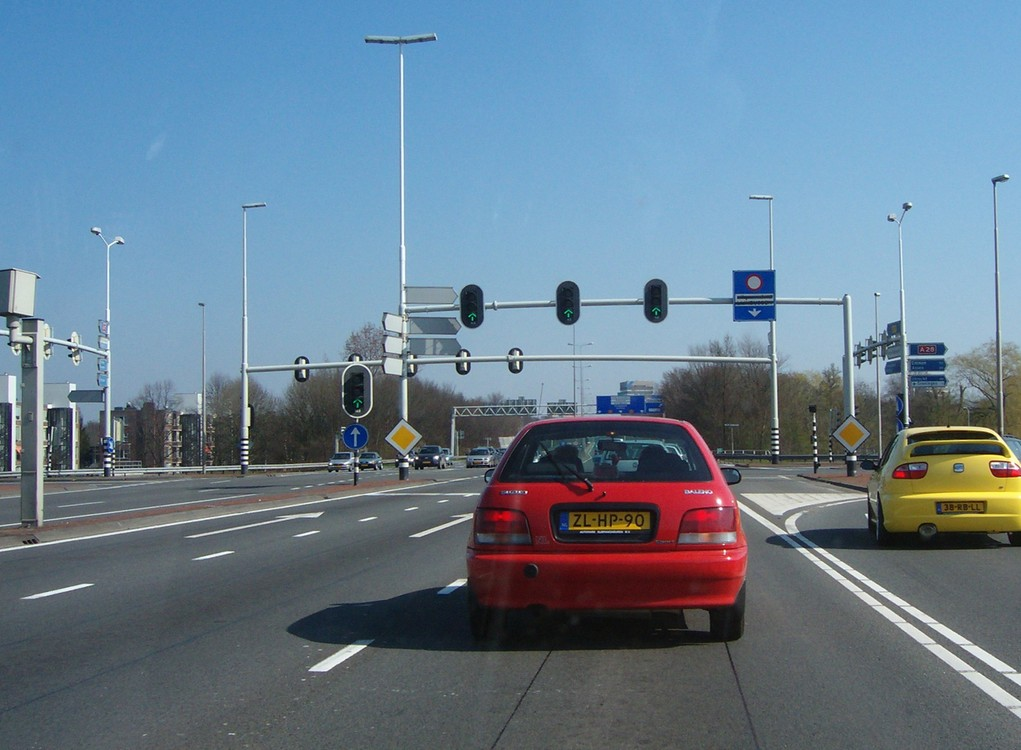
Interruption of the A7 in Groningen.

== Speed limit experiment ==
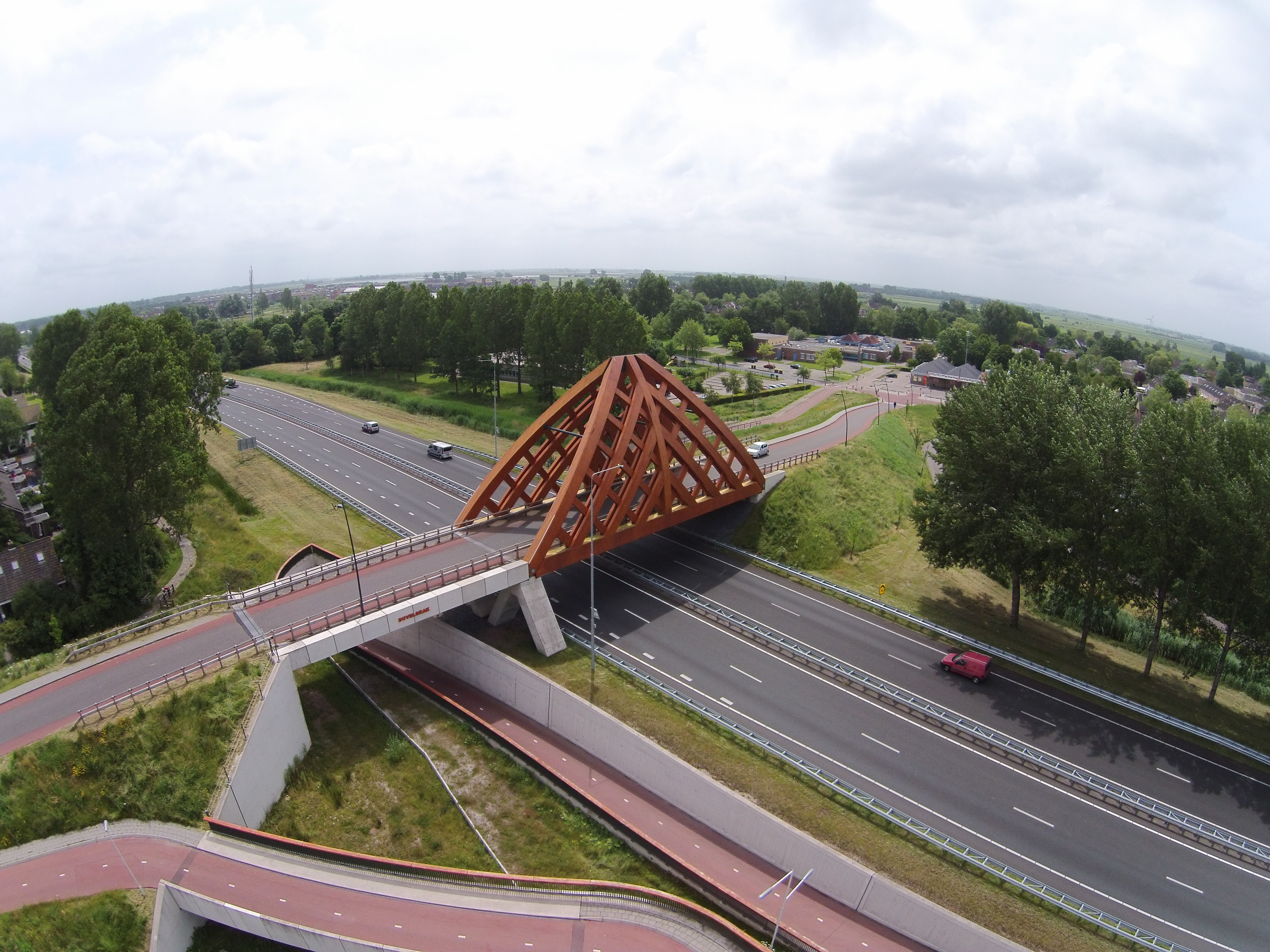
The A7 runs under the Duvelsrak viaduct in Sneek

From March 2011, on a section of the A7 motorway, motorists were allowed to drive at 130 km/h (80 mph), opposed to the then national speed limit of 120 km/h (75 mph). This was a government test to investigate if driving at these higher speeds have an effect on the environment and safety. The test resulted positively, and the national speed limit was raised to 130 km/h (80 mph) in October 2012.

== Afsluitdijk ==
The A7 runs across a historic part of Dutch engineering, the Afsluitdijk. This dam was originally created to protect the country's long interior coastline from floods by creating a large freshwater lake. The road over the Afsluitdijk was previously a 2-lane N road, but is now a proper motorway; the upgrade to motorway was achieved by utilising the dike's unused railway reservation for the second carriageway. Its midpoint is near the village of Breezanddijk. The former State Secretary for Infrastructure and the Environment, Joop Atsma, issued a statement detailing the factors influencing the decision to build a new naviduct on the Afsluitdijk section of the A7 at Kornwerderzand. A naviduct and new locks was costed at €200–450 million, depending on the size of locks and size of highway. A naviduct would give waiting time annualised benefits €13 million to road traffic, based on the existing bridge opening 7,000 times a year. Cost–benefit analysis of all potential solutions were considered, and a naviduct could be built to replace the locks when they reach the end of their useful life in 2050.

== Exit list ==
Country	Province	Municipality	km	mi	Exit	Destinations	Notes
Netherlands	North Holland	Zaanstad	4	2.5	—	S 151 west / S 155	
Netherlands	North Holland	Zaanstad	5	3.1	—	A 8 / E22 northeast	West end of E 22 overlap
Netherlands	North Holland	Zaanstad	7	4.3	2	N 515 west	
Netherlands	North Holland	Wormerland	11	6.8	3	Oosterdwarsweg	
Netherlands	North Holland	Purmerend	14	8.7	4	Laan der Continenten	
Netherlands	North Holland	Purmerend	15	9.3	5	N 235 east / Zuiddijk	
Netherlands	North Holland	Purmerend	17	11	6	N 244	
Netherlands	North Holland	Koggenland	29	18	7	N 243 southwest / N 247 south	
Netherlands	North Holland	Hoorn	32	20	8	Provincialeweg	
Netherlands	North Holland	Hoorn	34	21	9	N 307 east (Westfrisiaweg)	
Netherlands	North Holland	Medemblik	36	22	10	N 241 west (A.C. de Graafweg) / Tender	
Netherlands	North Holland	Medemblik	39	24	10a	Tuinstraat / Broerdijk	
Netherlands	North Holland	Medemblik	43	27	11	N 239 (Dijkweg)	
Netherlands	North Holland	Wieringermeer	50	31	12	N 242 southwest (Alkmaarseweg)	
Netherlands	North Holland	Wieringermeer	55	34	13	N 240 west and south / N 248 south	
Netherlands	North Holland	Wieringen	64	40	14	N 99 southwest (Rijksstraatweg)	
Netherlands	IJsselmeer / Wadden Sea				Afsluitdijk		
Netherlands	Friesland	Súdwest Fryslân	101	63	—	A 31	
Netherlands	Friesland	Súdwest Fryslân	101	63	15		
Netherlands	Friesland	Súdwest Fryslân	105	65	16	Weersterweg	
Netherlands	Friesland	Súdwest Fryslân	110	68	17	N 359 / Oude Rijksweg	
Netherlands	Friesland	Súdwest Fryslân	112	70	18	Kloosterlaan	
Netherlands	Friesland	Súdwest Fryslân	115	71	19	Tsjaerddyk / Hottingawei	
Netherlands	Friesland	Súdwest Fryslân	118	73	20	State As	West end of N7 road designation
Netherlands	Friesland	Súdwest Fryslân	119	74	21	N 354 south (Lemmerweg) / Lemmerweg	
Netherlands	Friesland	Súdwest Fryslân	119	74	21a	Akkenwinde / Selfhelpweg	Westbound exit and eastbound entrance only
Netherlands	Friesland	Súdwest Fryslân	120	75	22	N 354 northeast / Oppenhuizerweg / Lorentzstraat / Burgemeester Rasterhofflaan	East end of N7 road designation
Netherlands	Friesland	Skarsterlân	133	83	23	Woudfennen	
Netherlands	Friesland	Skarsterlân	136	85	—	A 6 southwest / Geert Knolweg	
Netherlands	Friesland	Skarsterlân	140	87	25	De Dolten / Nije Fjildwei	
Netherlands	Friesland	Heerenveen	142	88	26	Wetterwille / Weinmakker / Nije Fjildwei	Westbound exit and eastbound entrance only
Netherlands	Friesland	Heerenveen	144	89	—	A 32	
Netherlands	Friesland	Heerenveen	147	91	26a	Zestienroeden / Pastoriesingel	
Netherlands	Friesland	Opsterland	152	94	27	N 392 (Koaibosk)	
Netherlands	Friesland	Opsterland	158	98	28	Beetserweg	
Netherlands	Friesland	Smallingerland	161	100	29	Zuiderhogeweg	
Netherlands	Friesland	Smallingerland	165	103	30	N 381 south	
Netherlands	Friesland	Smallingerland	165	103	30a	N 31 northwest	
Netherlands	Friesland	Opsterland	170	110	31	N 358 northwest (De Scheiding) / De Scheiding	
Netherlands	Groningen	Marum	176	109	32	N 980 north (Noorderweg) / Noorderweg / Noorderringweg / Parallelweg	
Netherlands	Groningen	Marum	180	110	33	N 388 north (Boerakkerweg) / Boerakkerweg	
Netherlands	Groningen	Leek	184	114	34	N 372 south (Oude Postweg) / N 978 north (Oude Postweg) / Pasop / Blinkweg / Lage Traan / Kapteynlaan	
Netherlands	Groningen	Groningen	191	119	34a	Westpoortboulevard / Matsloot	Southern exit lies partially in Noordenveld, Drenthe
Netherlands	Groningen	Groningen	193	120	35	N 372 south (Ruskenveen) / Zuiderweg / Roderwolderdijk	
Netherlands	Groningen	Groningen	196	122	36	N 370 north (Laan 1940-1945) / Jan Evert Scholtenlaan / Laan Corpus Den Hoorn / Paterswoldseweg / Muntinglaan	West end of N7 road designation
Netherlands	Groningen	Groningen	196	122	36a	N 370 north	Westbound entrance only
Netherlands	Groningen	Groningen	197	122	—	E232 south (Julianaweg) / A 28 / Emmaviaduct / Hoornsediep	
Netherlands	Groningen	Groningen	198	123	37	Hereweg	
Netherlands	Groningen	Groningen	198	123	37a	Meeuwerderbaan / Europaweg / Winschoterdiep	Westbound entrance and eastbound exit only
Netherlands	Groningen	Groningen	199	124	38	Europaweg / Bergenweg / Lübeckweg / Osloweg / Euvelgunnebrug / Gotenburgweg / Kieler Bocht / Skagerrak	
Netherlands	Groningen	Groningen	204	127	—	N 46 northwest (Beneluxweg)	
Netherlands	Groningen	Groningen	205	127	39	Europaweg	East end of N7 road designation
Netherlands	Groningen	Hoogezand-Sappemeer	213	132	40	N 386 southwest (Rengerslaan) / Rengerslaan / A.B. Nobellaan	
Netherlands	Groningen	Hoogezand-Sappemeer	215	134	41	N 385 south (Kerkstraat) / N 387 north (Provinciale Weg) / Rijksweg West / Rijksweg Oost / Knijpslaan	
Netherlands	Groningen	Hoogezand-Sappemeer	218	135	42	Noordbroeksterstraat / Rijksweg oost	
Netherlands	Groningen	Menterwolde	222	138	43	Kerkstraat / Europaweg / Burgemeester Omtaweg	
Netherlands	Groningen	Menterwolde	224	139	44	N 33	
Netherlands	Groningen	Oldambt	230	140	45	N 362 north (Rijksweg) / Rijksweg	
Netherlands	Groningen	Oldambt	232	144	46	N 964 south	
Netherlands	Groningen	Oldambt	240	150	47	N 367 south (Oostereinde) / N 966 northeast (Oostereinde) / N 967 north	
Netherlands	Groningen	Oldambt	246	153	48	Ulsda / Ulsderweg / Heeresloot	
Netherlands	Groningen	Oldambt	251	156	49	Hamdijk	
Netherlands / Germany country line	Groningen / Lower Saxony province line	Reiderland / Bunde municipality line			—	E22 / A 280 east	Border with Germany; this road continues as the German A280; east end of E 22 overlap
1.000 mi = 1.609 km; 1.000 km = 0.621 mi: Concurrency terminus; Incomplete access; Route transition
