= A32 motorway (Netherlands) =

Motorway in the Netherlands

A32 motorway
- Rijksweg 32
- Motorways in the Netherlands with A32 and N32 bolt

Route information
- Maintained by Rijkswaterstaat

Major junctions
- South end: E232 / A 28 near Meppel
- E22 / A 7 in Heerenveen
- North end: N 31 near Leeuwarden

Location
- Country: Kingdom of the Netherlands
- Constituent country: Netherlands
- Provinces: Overijssel, Drenthe, Friesland

Highway system
- Roads in the Netherlands; Motorways; E-roads; Provincial; City routes
← A 31	→ A 35

The A32 motorway is a motorway in the Netherlands connecting Meppel, via Heerenveen to Leeuwarden. No part of the motorway is subject to a European route.

== Route description ==
Two aqueducts are located on the motorway's route: the Leppa-Akwadukt near Akkrum and the Akwadukt mid-Fryslân near Grou. Traffic jams occur in rush hour near Interchange Lankhorst, especially in the morning rush hour.

== History ==
A reconstruction of interchange Lankhorst is completed in 2009. The traffic jams to the interchange were solved by extra lanes southbound on the A28.

== Exit list ==
Province	Municipality	km	mi	Exit	Destinations	Notes
Overijssel	Staphorst	0.000	0.000	—	E232 / A 28 – Meppel, Staphorst	
Drenthe	Meppel			1	Europalaan / Noordweg	
Drenthe	Meppel			2	N 851 east (Hoogeveenseweg) / Blankenstein	
Drenthe	Meppel			3	N 375 / Provincialeweg	
Drenthe	Meppel			4	N 371 (Buitenvaart) / Jaagpad	
Overijssel	Steenwijkerland			5	Ruiterweg / Meppelerweg	
Overijssel	Steenwijkerland			6	N 855 northeast (Eesveenseweg) / Woldmeentherand	
Overijssel	Steenwijkerland			7	N 334 south (Steenwijkerweg)	
Friesland	Weststellingwerf			8	N 351 (Stellingenweg)	
Friesland	Weststellingwerf			9	Heerenveenseweg	
Friesland	Heerenveen			10	N 380 east (Schoterlandseweg) / De Kuinder	
Friesland	Heerenveen			11	Oranje Nassaulaan	
Friesland	Heerenveen			12	K.R. Poststraat	
Friesland	Heerenveen			—	E22 / A 7	
Friesland	Heerenveen			13	N 392 northeast / Alde Rykswei	
Friesland	Leeuwarden			14	Stationsweg	
Friesland	Leeuwarden			15	N 354 west	
Friesland	Leeuwarden			16	Legedyk / Oenemadyk	South end of N31 road designation
Friesland	Leeuwarden			—	N 31 / Overijsselselaan	North end of N31 road designation
1.000 mi = 1.609 km; 1.000 km = 0.621 mi: Route transition

== See also ==
- List of motorways in the Netherlands
- List of E-roads in the Netherlands
