= A8 motorway (Netherlands) =

Freeway in the Netherlands

A8 motorway
- Rijksweg 8
- Location of the A8 motorway

Route information
- Part of E22

Location
- Country: Kingdom of the Netherlands
- Constituent country: Netherlands

Highway system
- Roads in the Netherlands; Motorways; E-roads; Provincial; City routes

The A8 motorway is a motorway in the Netherlands. It starts at the intersection with the Ring Amsterdam (the A10 motorway) at interchange Coenplein, and leads past Oostzaan, interchange Zaandam, and Zaandijk towards its terminus, just 10 kilometers from its beginning at the Coenplein, near Assendelft.

== Overview ==
In the 1970s, this road was planned to be extended for about 5 extra kilometers towards the A9 motorway, between the interchange Beverwijk and the exit Heemskerk. However, due to the rising oil prices and the congestion which was already a problem at the A10 near the Coenplein, it was decided not to do so after all.

== N8 ==
Currently, along parts of the N246 and N203 roads, signs are placed with the number N8, to direct the motorist from the terminus of the A8 motorway towards the exit Uitgeest of the A9 motorway. However, the N8 is not part of the so-called Rijksweg 8, which only consists of the motorway part between the Coenplein and Assendelft.

== Future construction ==
In 2021 plans were made to construct a new road between the A8 and A9 motorways, in order to improve accessibility of the Zaanstreek and the IJmond region. The project was estimated to cost over €900 million. The parties are still looking for financing as of 2024.

== Exit list ==
The entire route is in North Holland Province.

Municipality	km	mi	Exit	Name	Destinations	Notes
Amsterdam	1	0.62	—	Interchange Coenplein	E22 / E35 / A 10	South end of E 22 overlap
Oostzaan	3	1.9	1	Oostzaan	N 516 / S 118 west / S 150 southeast	
Zaanstad	5	3.1	—	Interchange Zaandam	E22 north / A 7	North end of E 22 overlap
Zaanstad	8	5.0	2	Zaandijk	N 203 (Provincialeweg) / S 152 (Provincialeweg) / Kaarsenmakerstraat / Pellekaanstraat / Verzetstraat	Westbound exit and eastbound entrance
Zaanstad	9	5.6	3	Zaandijk-West	S 153 (Guisweg)	Westbound exit and eastbound entrance
Zaanstad	10	6.2	4	Assendelft-Noord	S 154 northwest (Noorderveenweg)	
Zaanstad	10	6.2	—	Wormer	N 8 north (Provincialeweg) / N 246 south (Provincialeweg)	
1.000 mi = 1.609 km; 1.000 km = 0.621 mi: Concurrency terminus; Incomplete access
