= Oudeschans =

- Village
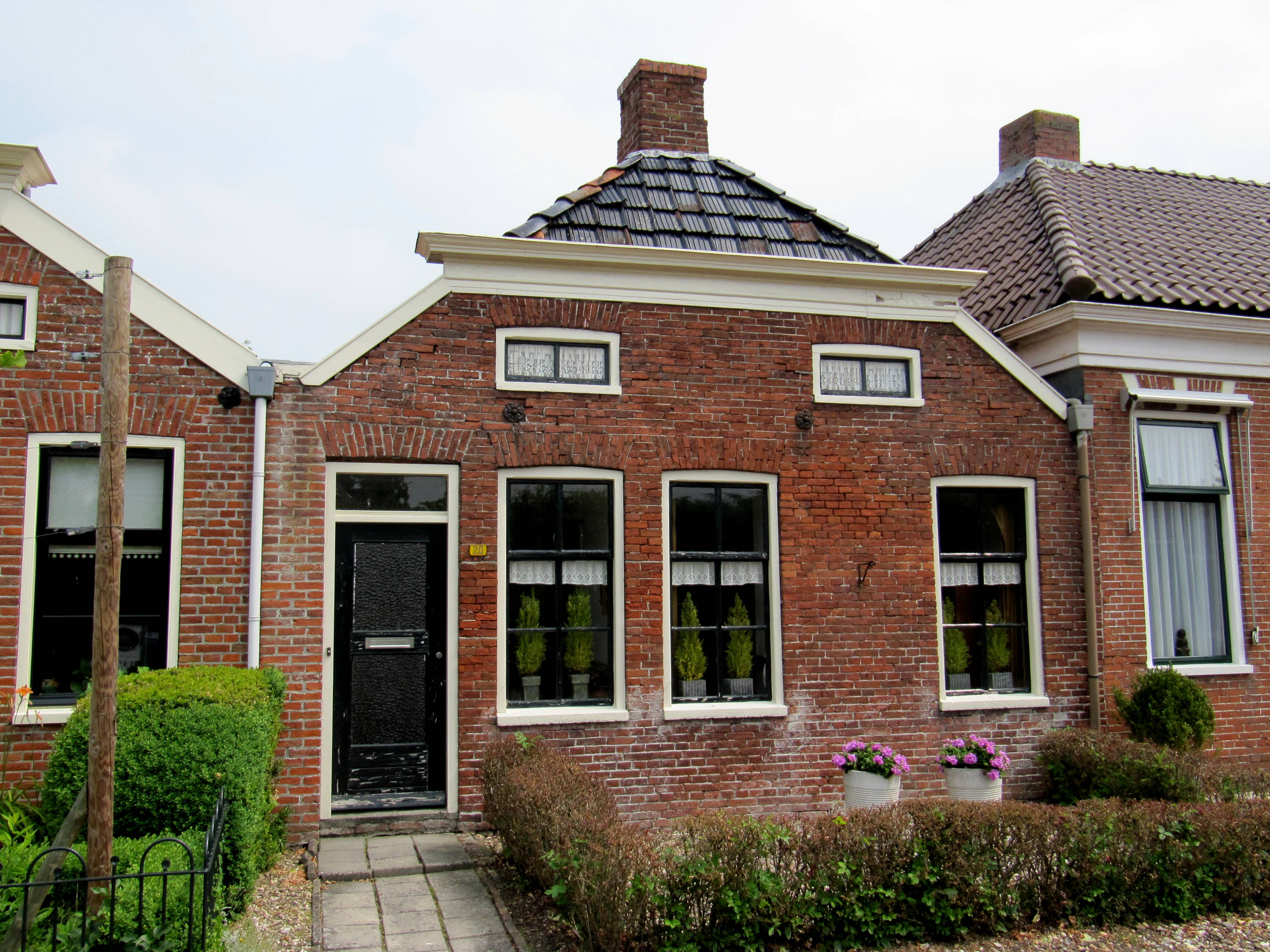
- Houses at the Voorstraat in Oudeschans

- Location in the province of Groningen in the Netherlands Oudeschans (Netherlands)
- Coordinates: 53°8′15″N 7°8′25″E
- Country: Netherlands
- Province: Groningen
- Municipality: Westerwolde

Area (2012)
  - Total: 46 ha (110 acres)
  - Land: 44 ha (110 acres)
  - Water: 2 ha (4.9 acres)

Population (2017)
  - Total: 100
  - Density: 230/km^{2} (590/sq mi)
- Postal code: 9696
- Area code: 0597

Oudeschans (Dutch pronunciation: [ˈʌudəˌsxɑns]) is a small village with a population of around 100 in the municipality of Westerwolde in the province of Groningen in the Netherlands. The 16th-century fortification is now a state protected village area with several national heritage sites, among which include a 17th-century garrison church, and the Vestingmuseum Oudeschans.

== Etymology ==
The fortification was initially named Bellingwolderschans, meaning Sconce of Bellingwolde, in 1593. It was renamed Oudeschans, meaning Old Sconce, after the fortification of Nieuweschans, meaning New Sconce, was built in 1628.

== History ==
In 1593, during the Eighty Years' War, the fortification was built by William Louis, Count of Nassau-Dillenburg to strengthen the strategically important Bellingwolderzijl (Sluice of Bellingwolde) connecting the river Westerwoldsche Aa to the Dollart. The fortification was used for military purposes until 1814.

In the 1980s, some of the walls, canals, and bastions were restored. In 1991, the fortification became a state protected village area (Dutch: beschermd dorpsgezicht).

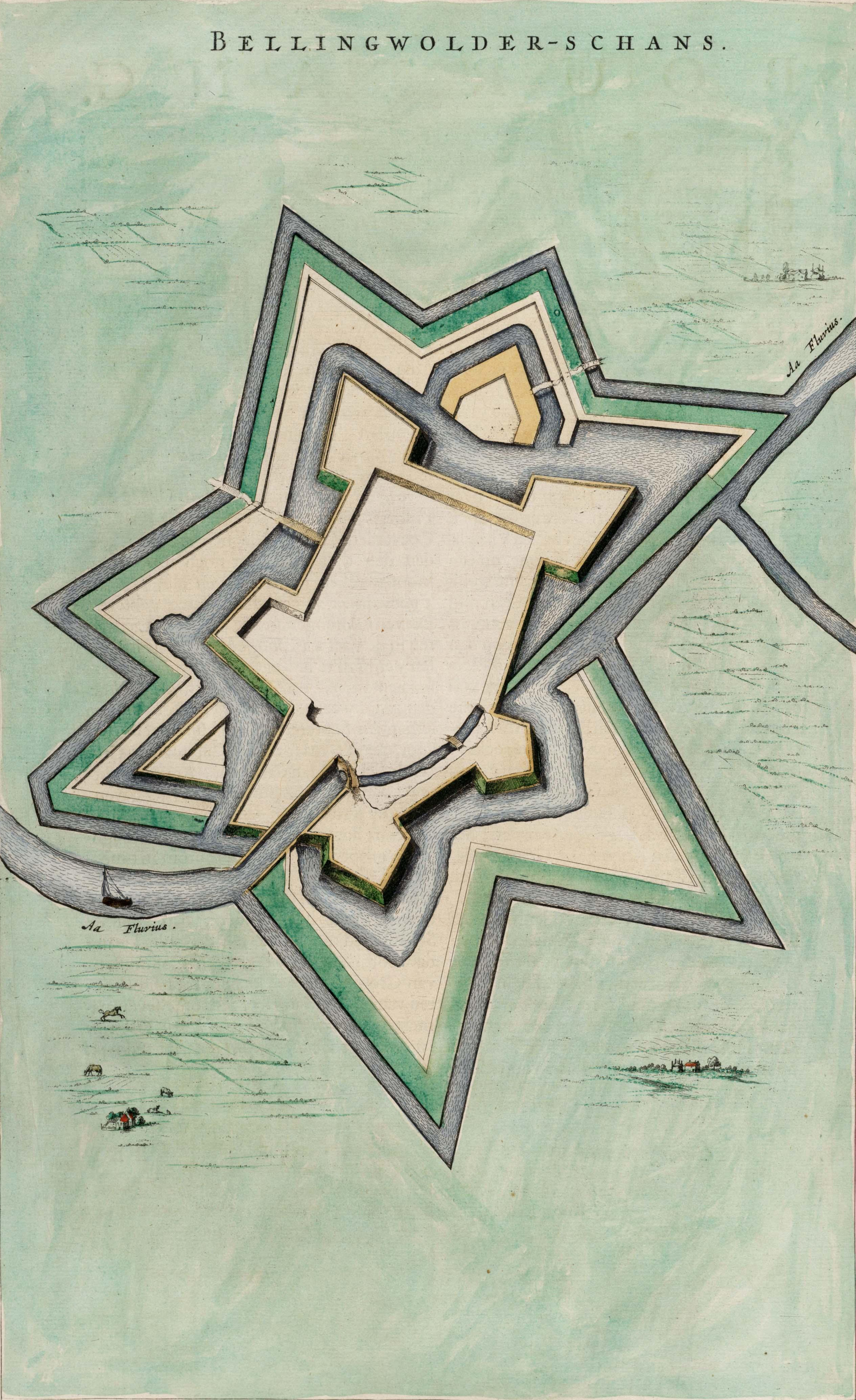
Map of the fortification from the Atlas Van Loon (1649)

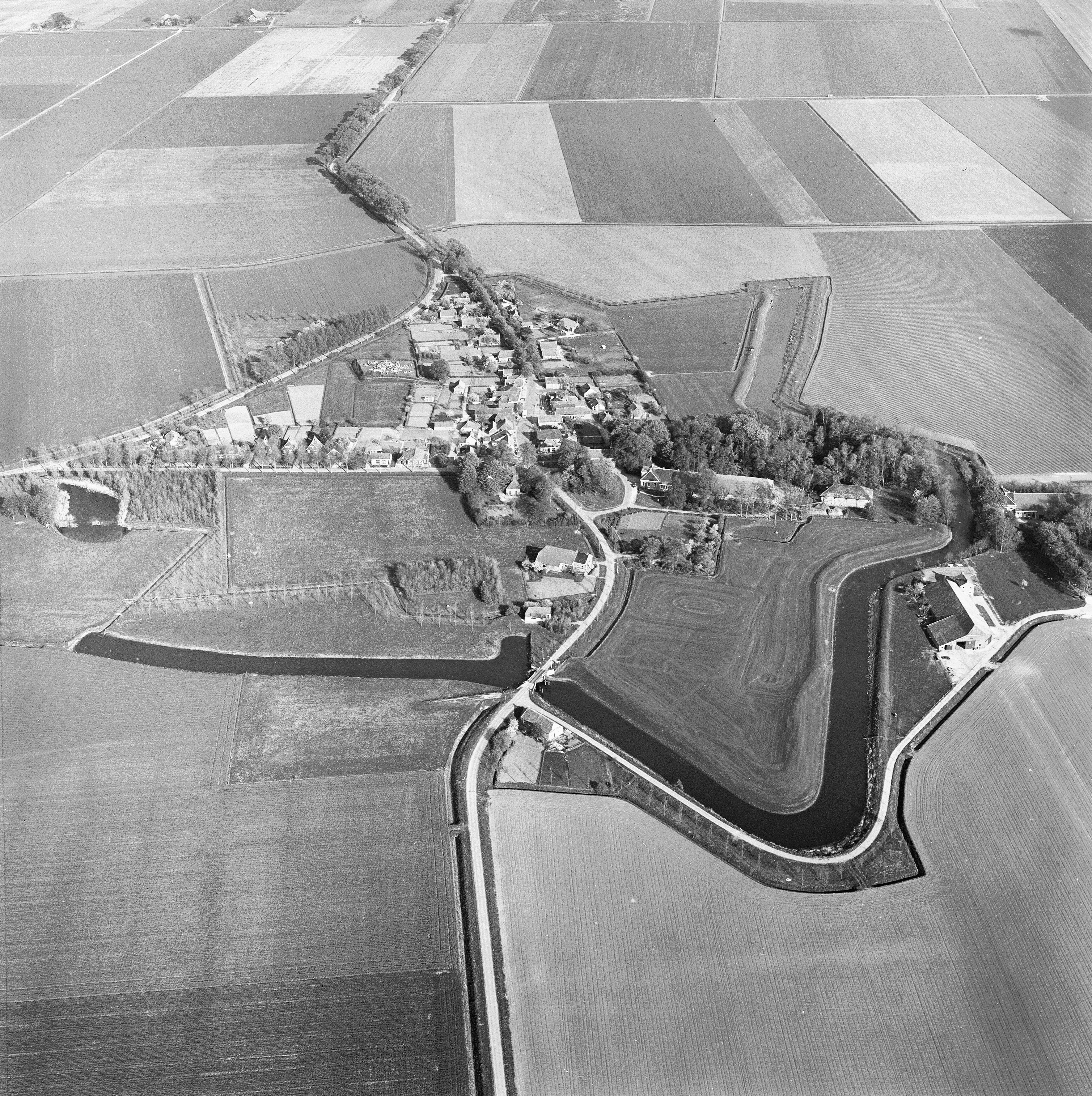
Aerial photograph, 1977

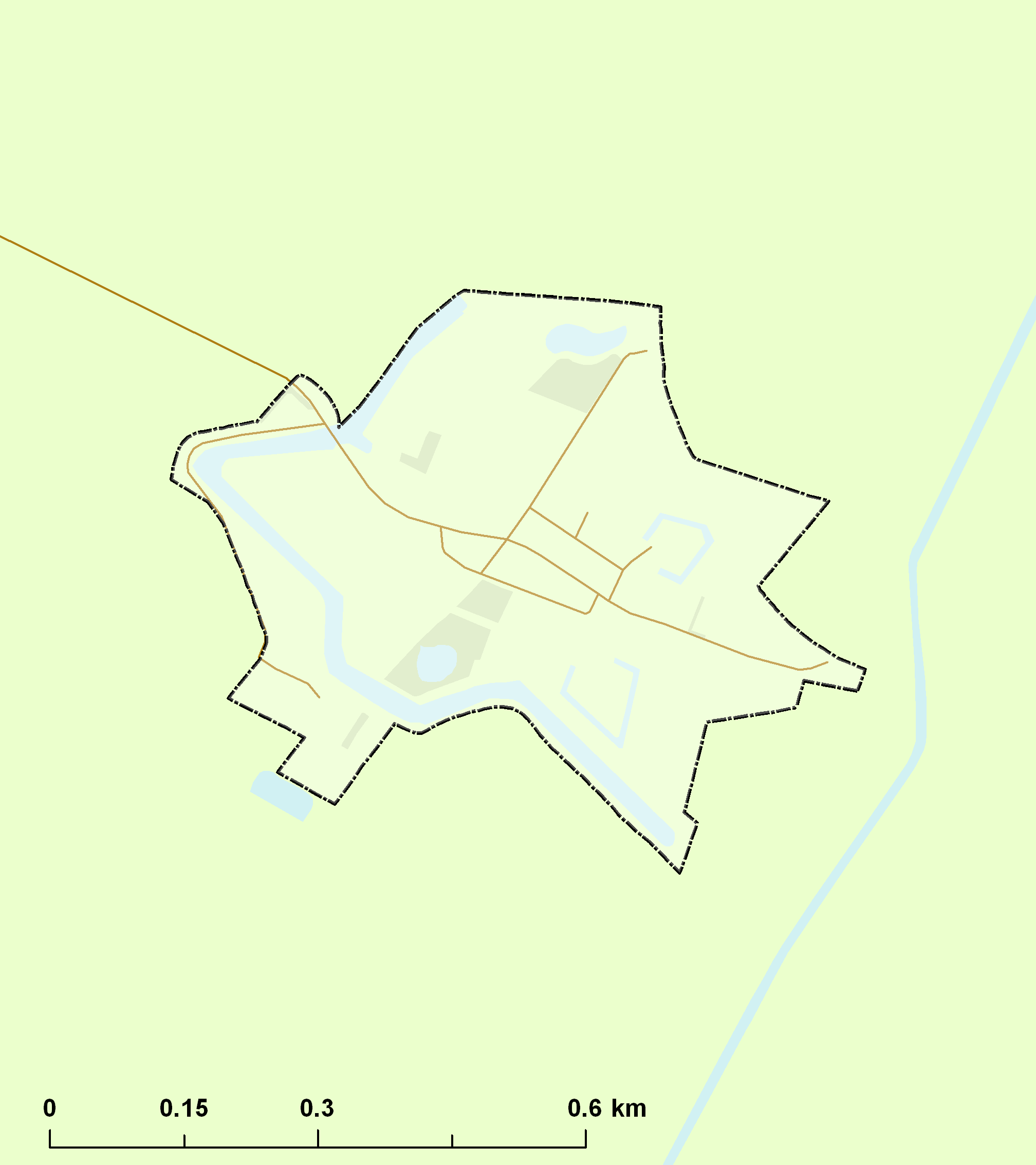
Protected village area

== Geography ==
Oudeschans is located at 53°8′15″N 7°8′25″E (53.14, 7.14) in the north of the municipality of Westerwolde, in the east of the province of Groningen, in the northeast of the Netherlands. The village is in the southeast of the region Oldambt, situated between the river Westerwoldse Aa in the west and the canal B.L. Tijdenskanaal in the east.

The nearest village is Bellingwolde to the southeast and the nearest city is Winschoten to the west. Other nearby villages are Beerta in the northwest, Bad Nieuweschans in the northeast, Vriescheloo in the south, and Blijham in the southwest.

Oudeschans is an administrative neighborhood (Dutch: buurt) in the district (Dutch: wijk) of Bellingwolde. The neighborhood has a total area of 46 ha (110 acres), of which 44 ha (110 acres) is land and 2 ha (4.9 acres) is water.

== Demographics ==
In 2012, the village had a population of 95 and a population density of 206.5/km^{2} (535/sq mi).

== Attractions ==
The 17th-century garrison church, walls, canal, bastions, and several other buildings are state monuments (Dutch: rijksmonumenten).

Vestingmuseum Oudeschans is a local museum about the history of the fortification of Oudeschans with a display of archaeological findings from the 17th and 18th centuries.

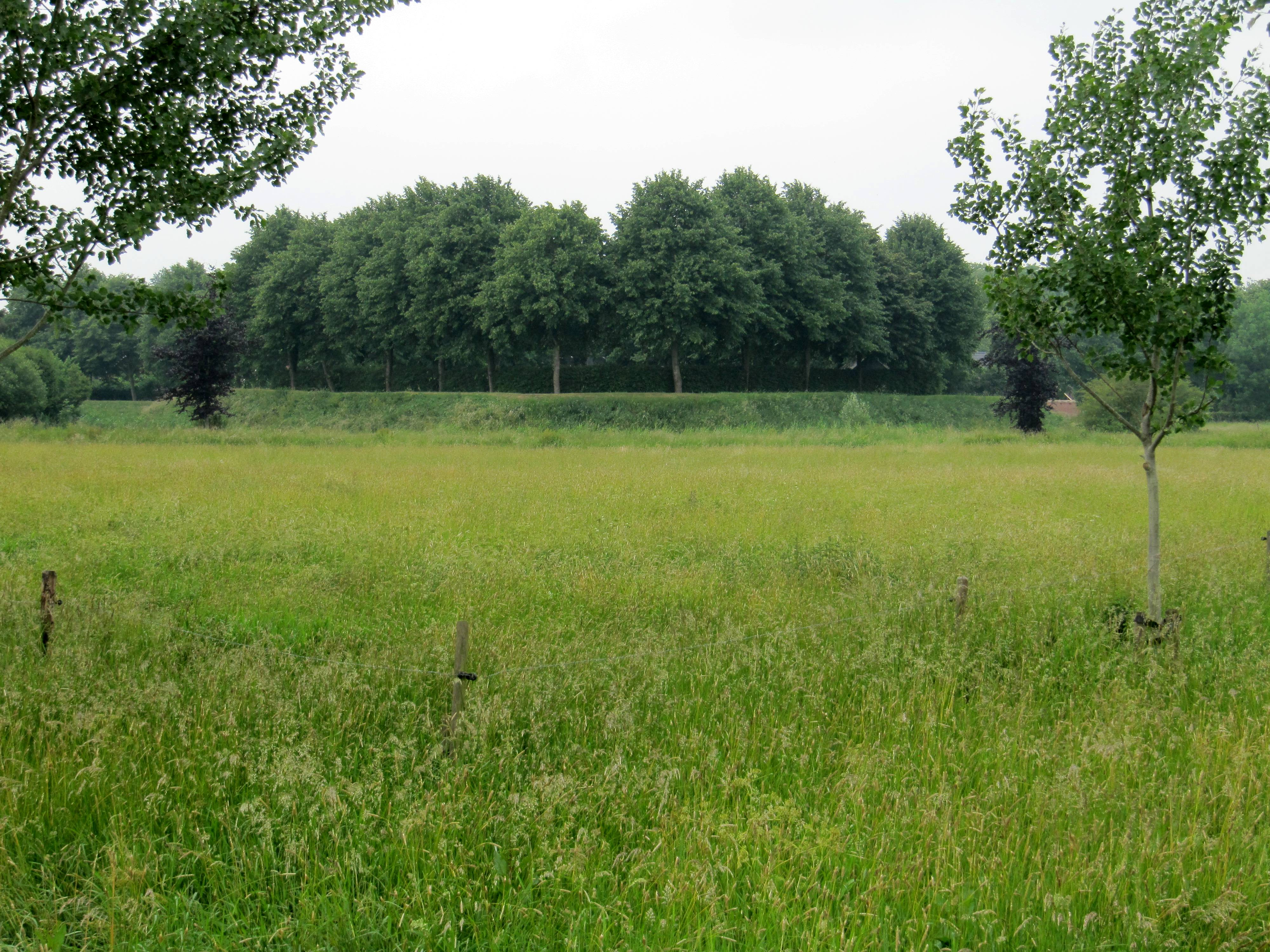
Bastion

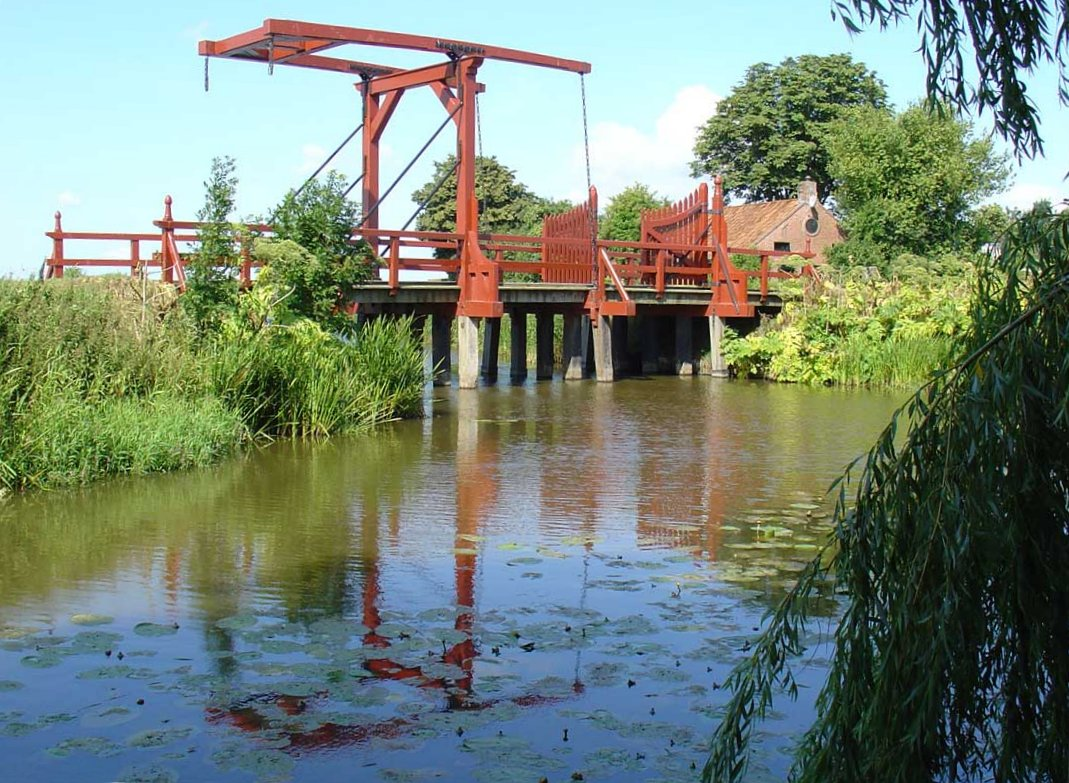
Canal and draw bridge

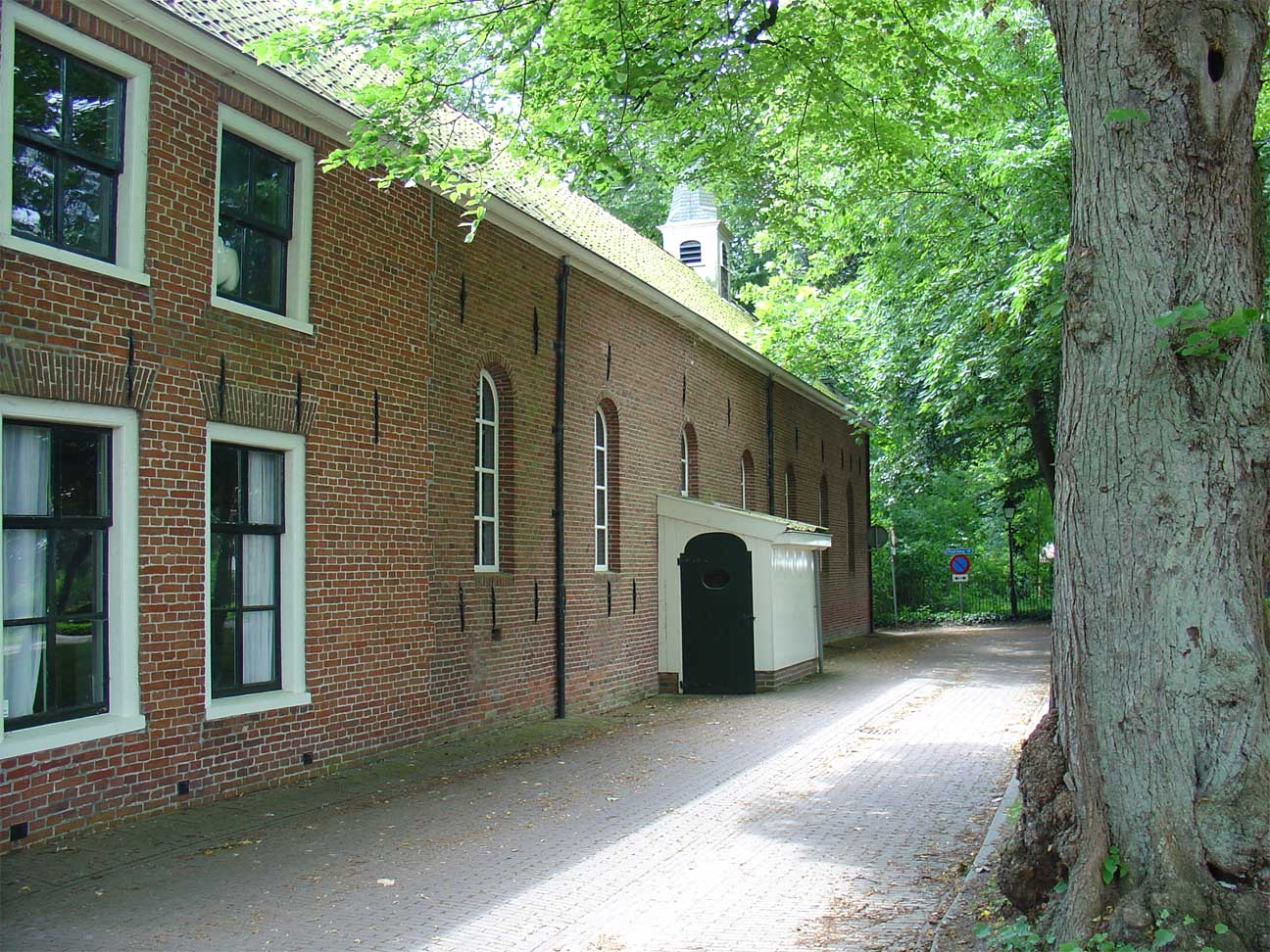
Garrison church

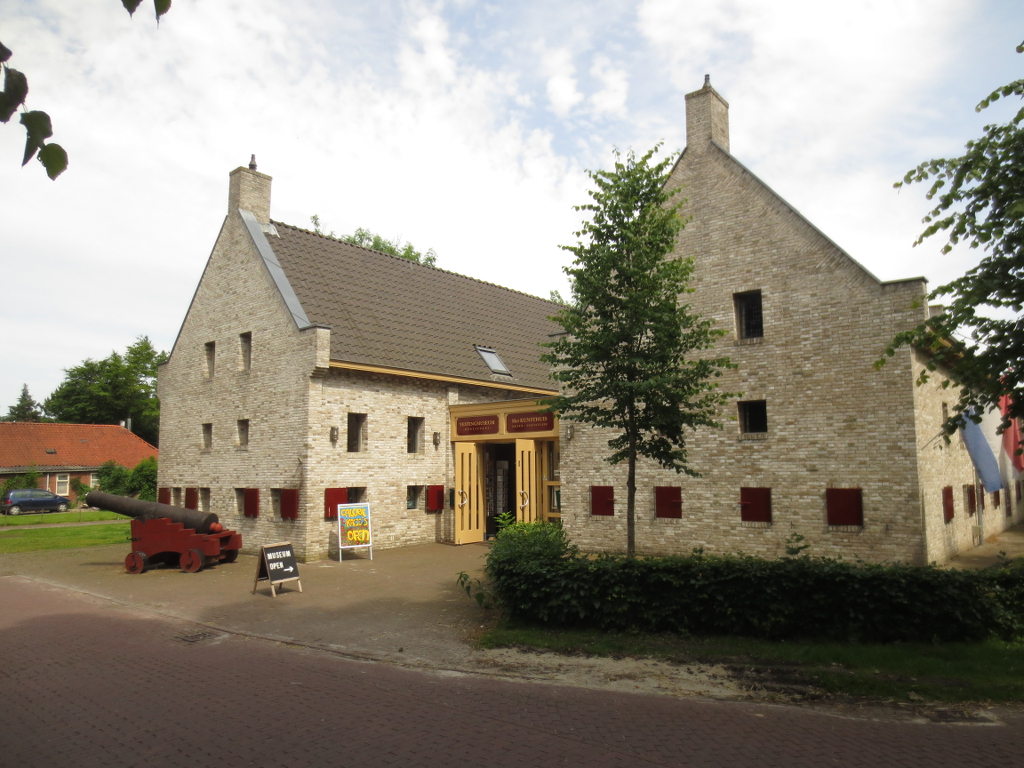
Vestingmuseum and art gallery

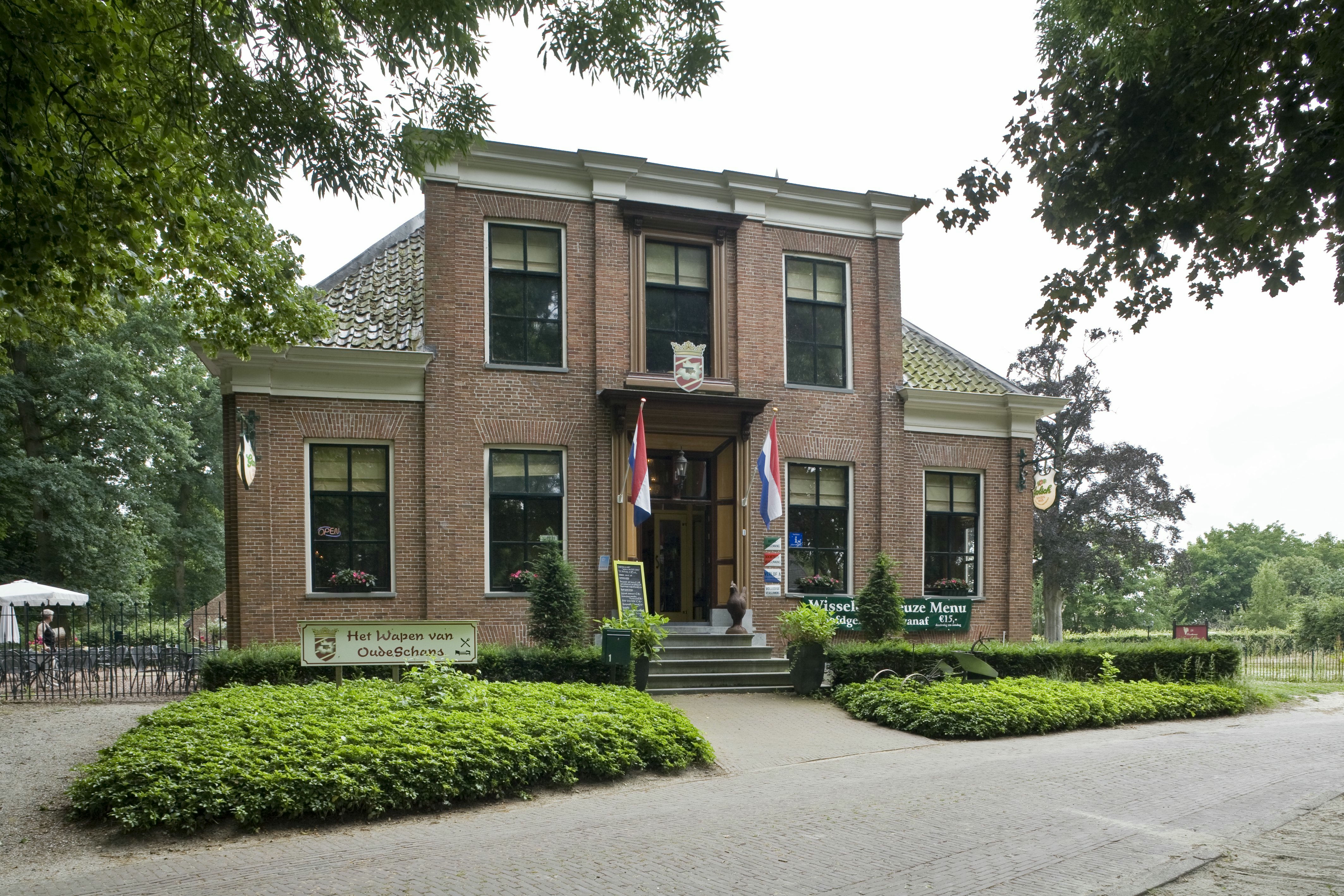
Farmhouse
