= A31 motorway (Netherlands) =

Motorway in Friesland

Location of the A31 / N31.

The A31 / N31 is a motorway and an expressway in the Netherlands. It connects the A7 near Zurich with the A7 near Drachten, passing close to Leeuwarden, the provincial capital of Friesland.

== Route description ==
This section needs updating, due to changes on the road

The short section between the Zurich interchange with the A7, and exit 15 for Zurich (approx 1.7 km) is designated as the A31 and is built to motorway standards. The next 7 km continues as a 4-lane expressway, until the road narrows to just a normal 2-lane road for the next 3 km while it passes over an elevated section through Harlingen. This section from Zurich to Harlingen is designated as the N31, but retains the motorway-style grade separated intersections. For the next 18 km, until exit 22 for Marssum, the road is once again designated the A31 and is built to motorway standards. This section of the A31 bypasses the towns of Franeker and Dronrijp. At exit 22 one has to take this exit to follow the N31 while continuing over the exit, the road reverts to an expressway and continues as the N383 into Leeuwarden.

The remaining 35 km of the N31, until it meets exit 30 of the A7, is once again an expressway. Of this last section, the first 13 km around Leeuwarden is a just a 2-lane road with at-grade intersections and utilises traffic signals and roundabouts, while the final section opens out into 4-lanes with grade separated intersections. The widening of this last section to four lanes, was completed in 2008.

=== History ===
Harlingen-Port was supposed to be an exchanging point for mainly passengers, already in 1845–64, and so, supposed to be connected by three railway junctions. One of these was planned alongside the 'Afsluitdijk' (enclosure-Dam). Besides that, Harlingen was connected by road to the E-10 highway running from Barcelone to St.Petersbourg. In the opinion of the NL government, Harlingen-Port was/is doomed to be insulated but, Harlingens' and Friesland/Gronings isolation was decided politically and not on a geographical basis. The industry and transport connection of Friesland-Groningen provinces was also politically determined not to develop. The 're-numbering' of the E10 Highway onto 'N31' was determined with the political decision, to de-generate important Hinterland-connections out from Harlingen-Port. The highway was built without escape lanes, like the 'n31' connection Leeuwarden onto Drachten.... and therefore more dangerous, because of no entrance to emergency 112 vehicles in case of accidents.

The real highways in NL and Northern NL are named 'A-highways' like A7, A1, A2.

The railway along The Afsluitdijk was also planned along the trajectory of the now realized 4-lanes Motorway 'N31' Harlingen-Zurch-'Afsluitdijk.' The Railway along this enclosure-dike was discerned after WW II in 1940 to 1945, of cause by the decision, to electrify the railjoncton Statal Railway no. A (Groningen/Leeuwarden—Zwolle (Utrecht) - Arnhem.

== Exit list ==
The entire route is in Friesland Province.

Municipality	km	mi	Exit	Name	Destinations	Notes
Súdwest-Fryslân	5	3.1	15	Interchange Zurich	A 7	
Súdwest-Fryslân	12	7.5	—	Kimswerd		South end of N31 road designation
Harlingen, Netherlands	15	9.3	—	Harlingen, Friesland		
Harlingen, Netherlands	18	11	19	Midlum	N 390	North end of N31 road designation
Waadhoeke	23	14	20	Franeker	N 384	
Waadhoeke	30	19	21	Dronrijp		
Waadhoeke	35	22	22	Marssum / Heerenveen	N 383	West end of N31 road designation
Leeuwarden	43	27	24	Leeuwarden		
Leeuwarden	44.5	27.7	25	Leeuwarden-Zuid	N 32	
Leeuwarden	47.5	29.5	26	Leeuwarden-Oost	N 358	
Tytsjerksteradiel	55.5	34.5	—	Garyp	N 913	
Smallingerland	60.5	37.6	—	Nijega	N 356	
Smallingerland	65	40	—	Rottevalle	N 369	
Smallingerland	69	43	—	Drachten		
Smallingerland	69.5	43.2	30a	Amsterdam / Groningen	A 7	East end of N31 road designation
1.000 mi = 1.609 km; 1.000 km = 0.621 mi: Route transition
