= Bundesautobahn 280 =

Federal motorway in Germany

A 280
- Bundesautobahn 280

Route information
- Part of E22
- Length: 4 km (2.5 mi)

Location
- Country: Germany
- States: Lower Saxony

Highway system
- Roads in Germany; Autobahns; List; Federal; List; State; E-roads

Bundesautobahn 280 (translates from German as Federal Motorway 280, short form Autobahn 280, abbreviated as BAB 280 or A 280) is an autobahn located in the extreme north-west of Lower Saxony. It connects the A 31 with the Dutch border. Behind the border it continues as the Autosnelweg 7.

== Exit list ==
| A 7 | Netherlands |
| (1) | Bad Nieuweschans border crossing |
| | Services Bunderneuland |
| (2) | Bunde-West |
| (3) | Bunde 3-way interchange A 31 |

At this short piece of Autobahn there are no exit numbers at the exits (there is in fact just one exit).
