= Zurich, Netherlands =

Zurich Surch
- Village
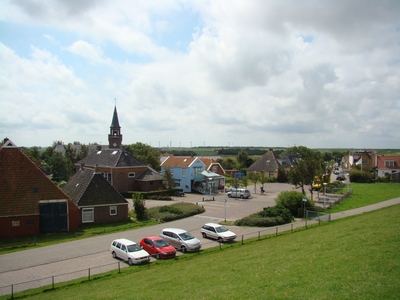
- Zurich from its dike

- Flag Coat of arms

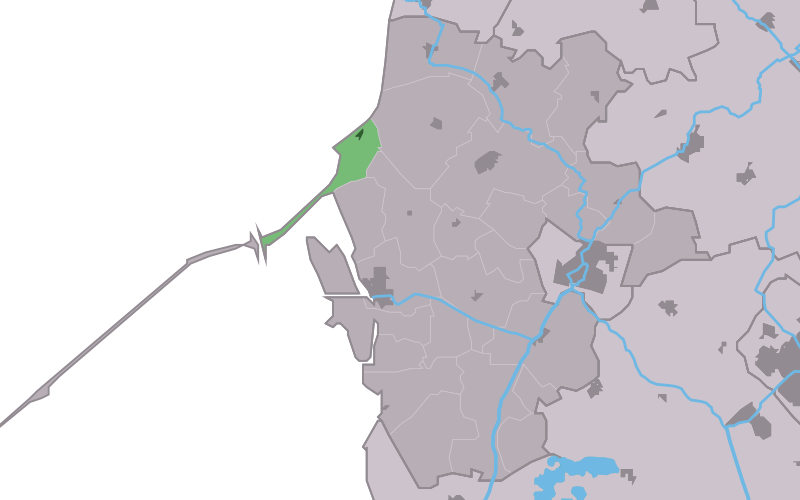
- Location in the former Wûnseradiel municipality

- Location in the Netherlands Zurich (Netherlands)
- Country: Netherlands
- Province: Friesland
- Municipality: Súdwest-Fryslân

Population (2020)
  - Total: 145
- Time zone: UTC+1 (CET)
  - Summer (DST): UTC+2 (CEST)
- Postal code: 8751
- Dialing code: 0517

Zurich (West Frisian: Surch) is a village in the north of the Netherlands. It is located in Súdwest-Fryslân, Friesland.

== History ==
In 1352 the place was mentioned as Zuderinghe, in 1353 as Zudrineghe, in 1399 as Sudringe, in 1482 as Surich, in 1505 as Suyrich, in 1579 as Surich, and at the end of the 17th century in Frisian as Swrich.

The name is very similar to Zürich and in English identical. A proposal in 2000 by the municipality of Wonseradeel to change the name to Surch led to local opposition and was ultimately withdrawn.

On 1 January 1830, the village had 152 inhabitants. Due to the construction of the Afsluitdijk, the population increased to 340 people in 1958. When the road to Afsluitdijk stopped running through the village, the population decreased again. In 2011 there were 168 villagers. In January 2017, Zurich had a population of around 190. In 2019 and 2020 Zurich had 145 inhabitants.

== Photogallery ==
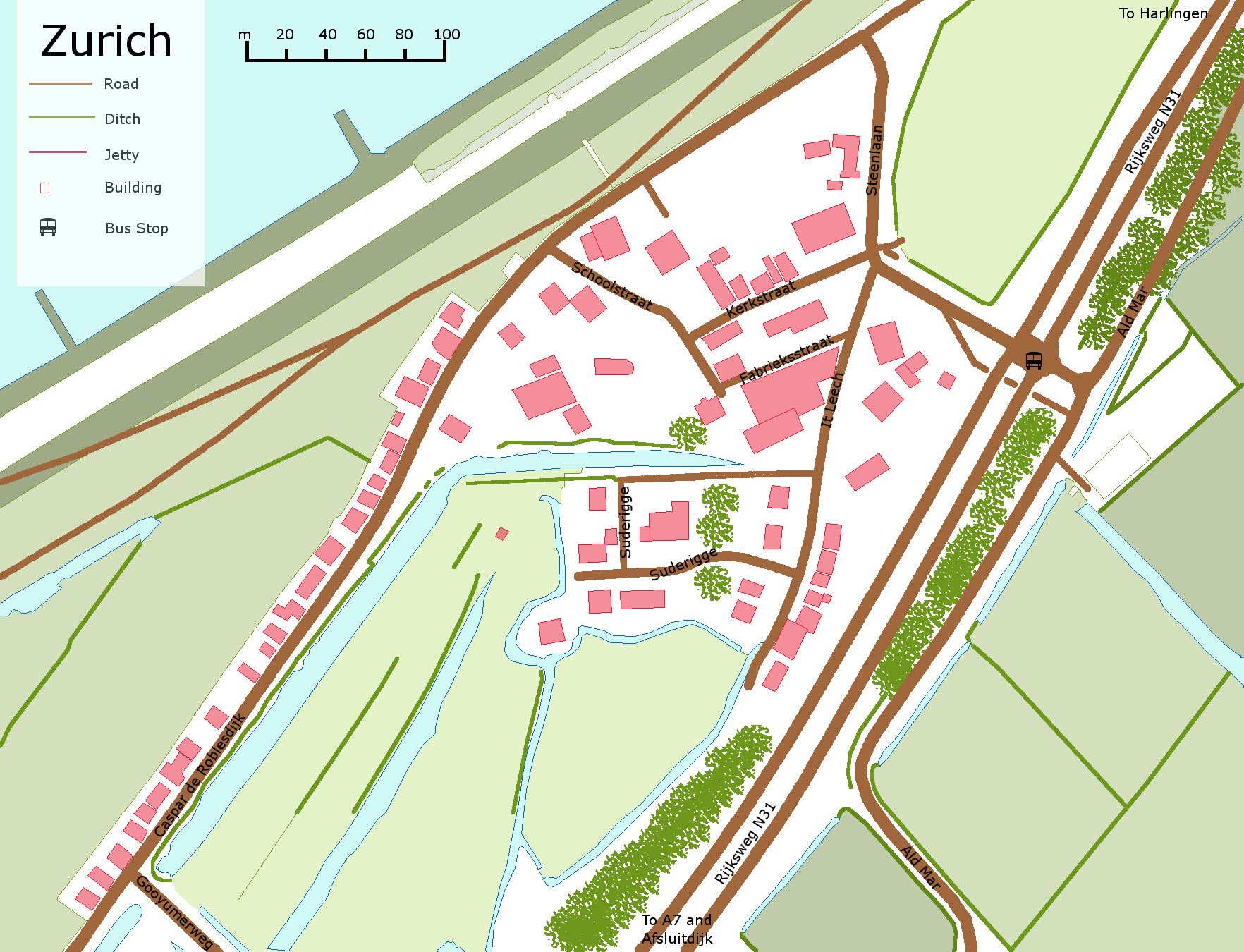
Village map

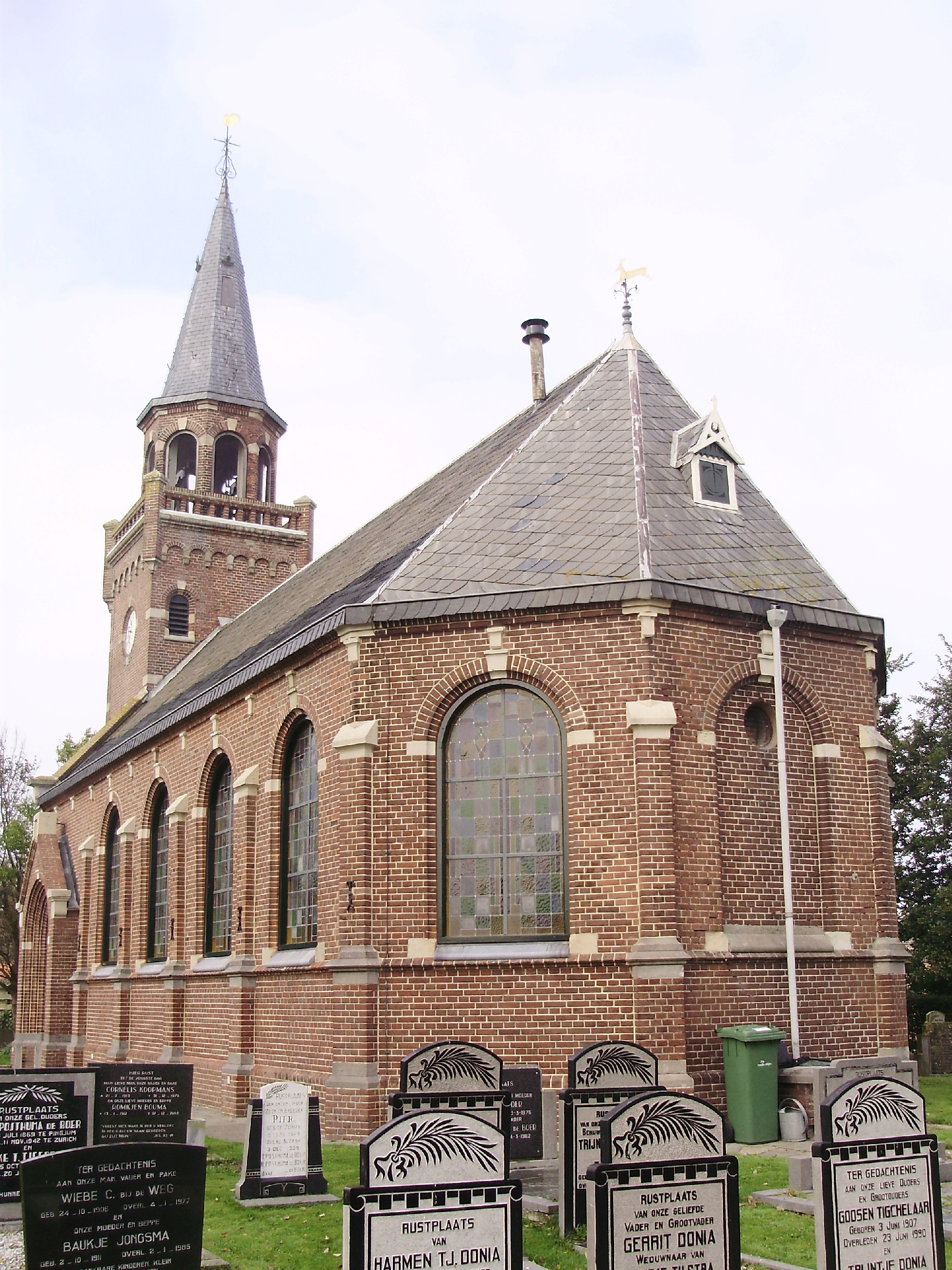
Village church

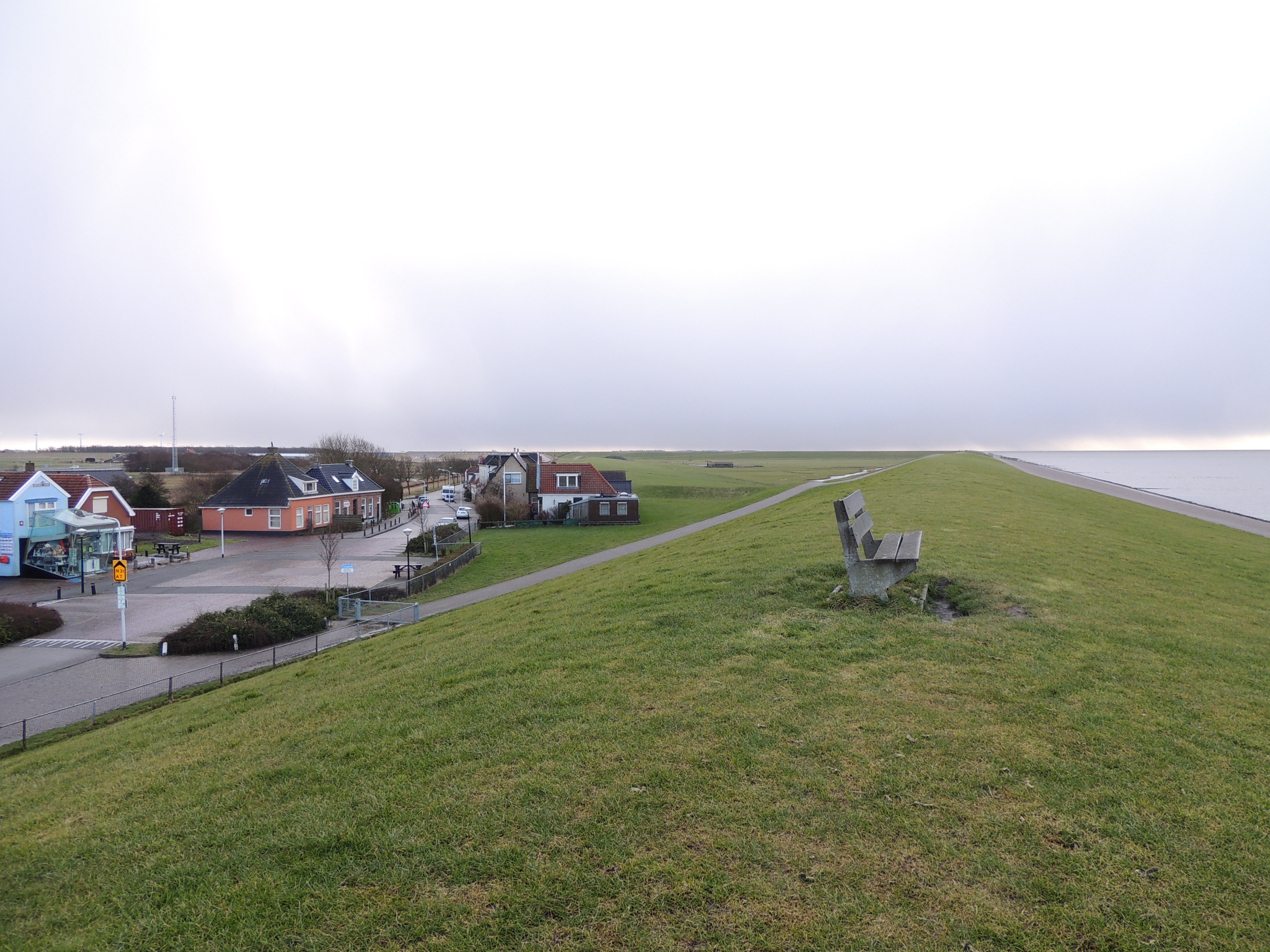
Dike by Zurich

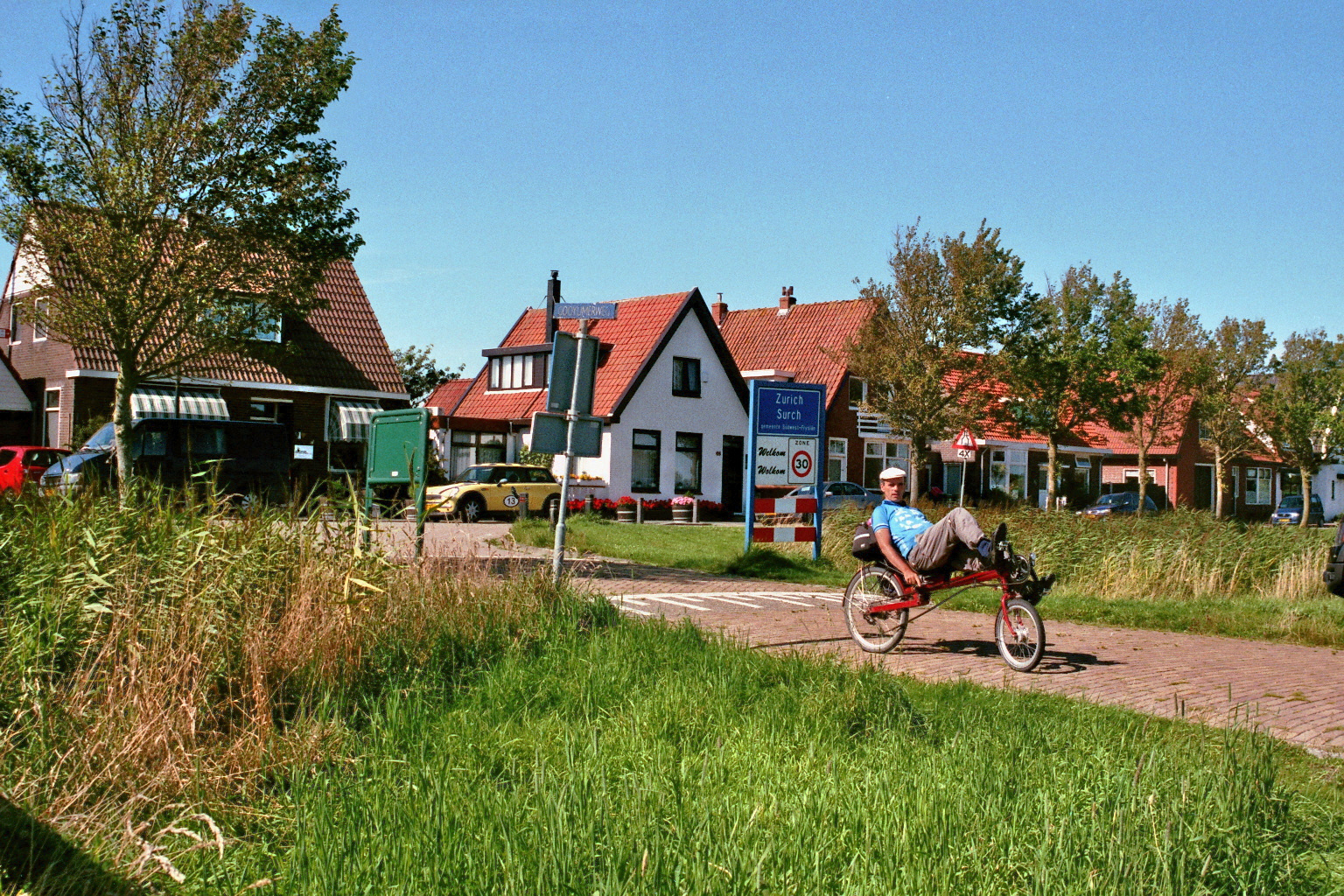
Gooyumerweg (forefront) and Roblesdijk (across)
