= Bad Nieuweschans =

Bad Nieuweschans Nij-Schans (Gronings)
- Village
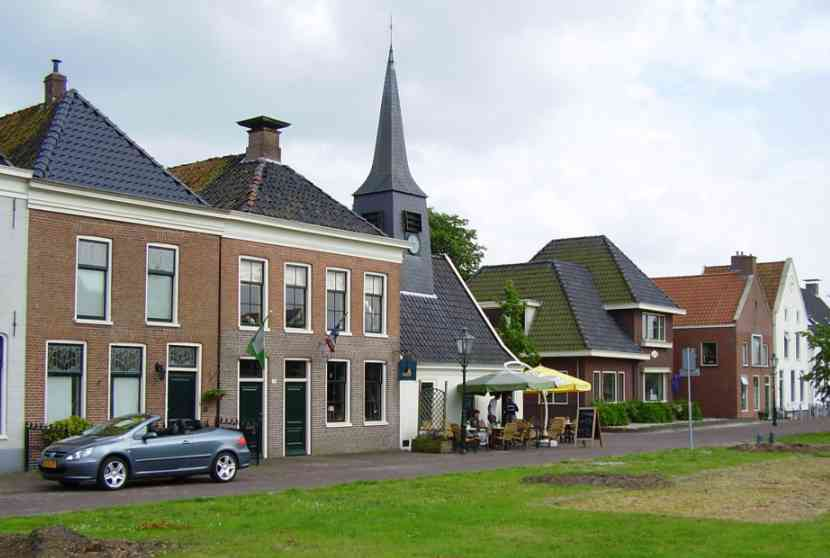
- Bad Nieuweschans in 2005

- Location of Bad Nieuweschans in the province of Groningen Bad Nieuweschans (Netherlands)
- Coordinates: 53°10′50″N 7°12′26″E
- Country: Netherlands
- Province: Groningen
- Municipality: Oldambt
- Established: 1628

Area
  - Total: 1.97 km^{2} (0.76 sq mi)
- Elevation: 1 m (3.3 ft)

Population (2021)
  - Total: 1,330
  - Density: 675/km^{2} (1,750/sq mi)
- Time zone: UTC+1 (CET)
  - Summer (DST): UTC+2 (CEST)
- Postal code: 9693
- Dialing code: 0597

Bad Nieuweschans (Dutch: [bɑt ˈniu.əsxɑns]; Gronings: Nij-Schans; German: Bad Neuschanz; Dialect: Bad Noajwschansk; also Lange Akkeren) is a village in the north-eastern Netherlands on the border with Germany. It forms part of the municipality of Oldambt. Nieuweschans means "new fortification (sconce)". In 2009, the word Bad ("spa") was prefixed to the name of the village to promote it as a tourist destination.

== History ==
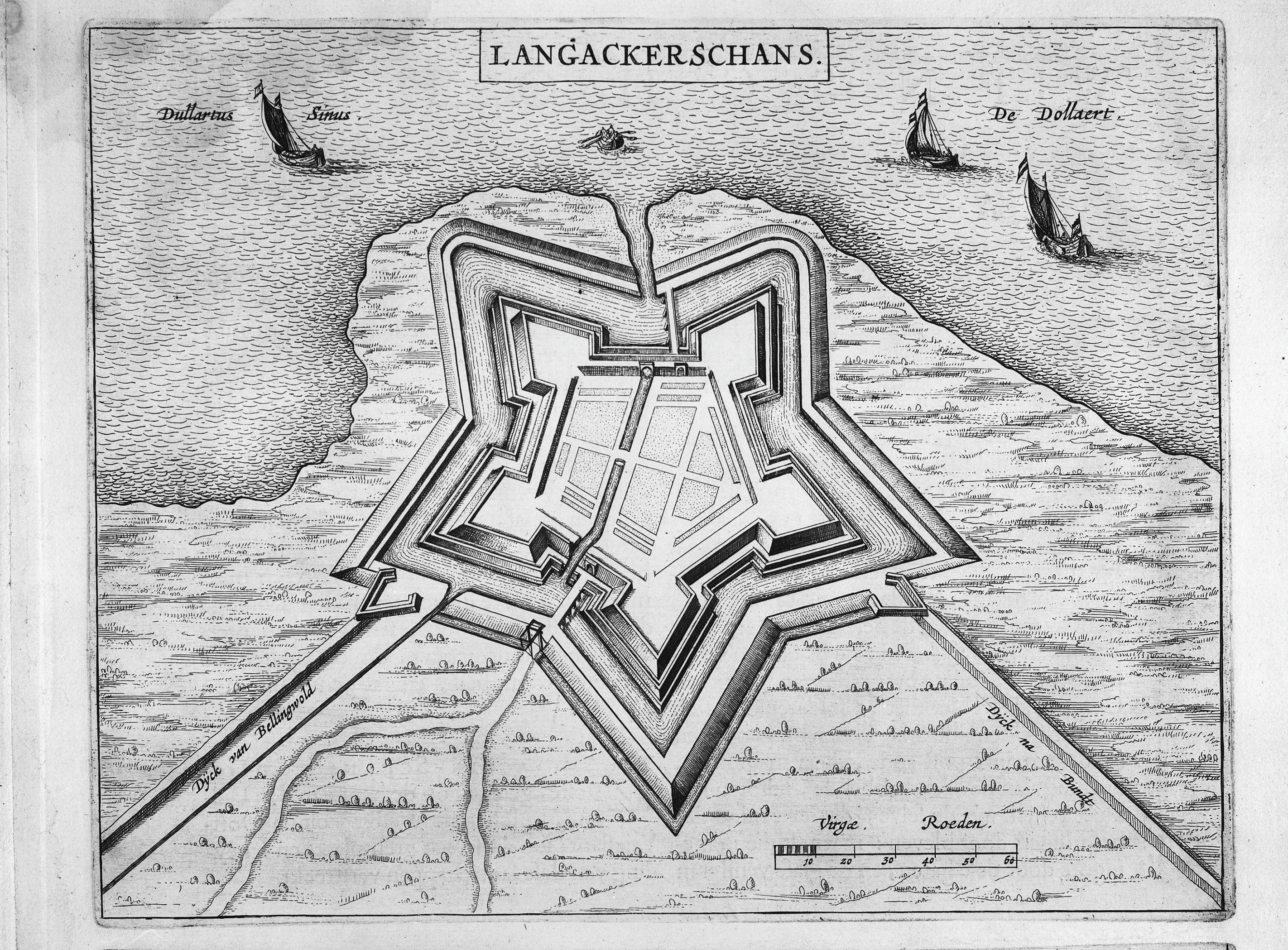
Map of the fortification

Bad Nieuweschans is located in a part of the Dollart which was flooded during the 13th century. In the 1550s, the Dollart was reclaimed by large-scale poldering. In 1626, the area around Oudeschans was poldered, and a settlement appeared in the Nieuwenschans area which was originally called Lange Akkeren.

The fortification of Nieuweschans was built in 1628, during the Eighty Years' War. The sconce was a pentagon surrounded by earthen walls and canals. The fortification was still in use during the French occupation. In 1815, the garrison was disbanded, and between 1870 and 1907, the fortifications were dismantled.

In 1974, Bad Nieuweschans was declared a protected site, and large scale restoration of the village started. In 1985, Thermen Bad Nieuweschans, a spa, was established after the discovery of mineral water at a depth of 600 metres (2,000 ft).

Nieuweschans was a separate municipality until 1990, when it became a part of the municipality of Reiderland. In April 2009, the municipality of Reiderland changed the name from Nieuweschans to Bad Nieuweschans, to promote the town as a spa. On 1 January 2010, Reiderland in turn became a part of the municipality of Oldambt.

== Geography ==
Bad Nieuweschans is located in the municipality of Oldambt in the east of the province of Groningen in the northeast of the Netherlands.

Close to the village is the easternmost point of the Netherlands on the border with Germany.

It is located about 10 km east of Winschoten.

== Transportation ==
The Bad Nieuweschans railway station is located on the Harlingen–Nieuweschans and Ihrhove–Nieuweschans railways in the north-east of the village. The railway station opened in 1869, however the connection to Hamburg took another eight years. Georges Simenon's novel Maigret and the Hundred Gibbets starts in the railway station.

Bad Nieuweschans served as the main border crossing between Groningen and Hamburg. Traffic had to pass through the village which often caused long traffic jams during the holidays. An international motorway was planned which would pass Bad Nieuweschans to the south on German soil. In 1963, the border between the Netherlands and Germany was modified. The new border was established south of the planned road, and the construction could begin. On 30 April 1969, the A7 opened, however it was still a single lane road, and construction in Germany had not started. In April 1993, the A7 was finally upgraded to motorway standards, and in October 1994, the A280 opened in Germany.

== Notable people ==
- Levi Benima (1838–1922), chess master
- Rynie Wolters (1844–1917), baseball player

== Gallery ==
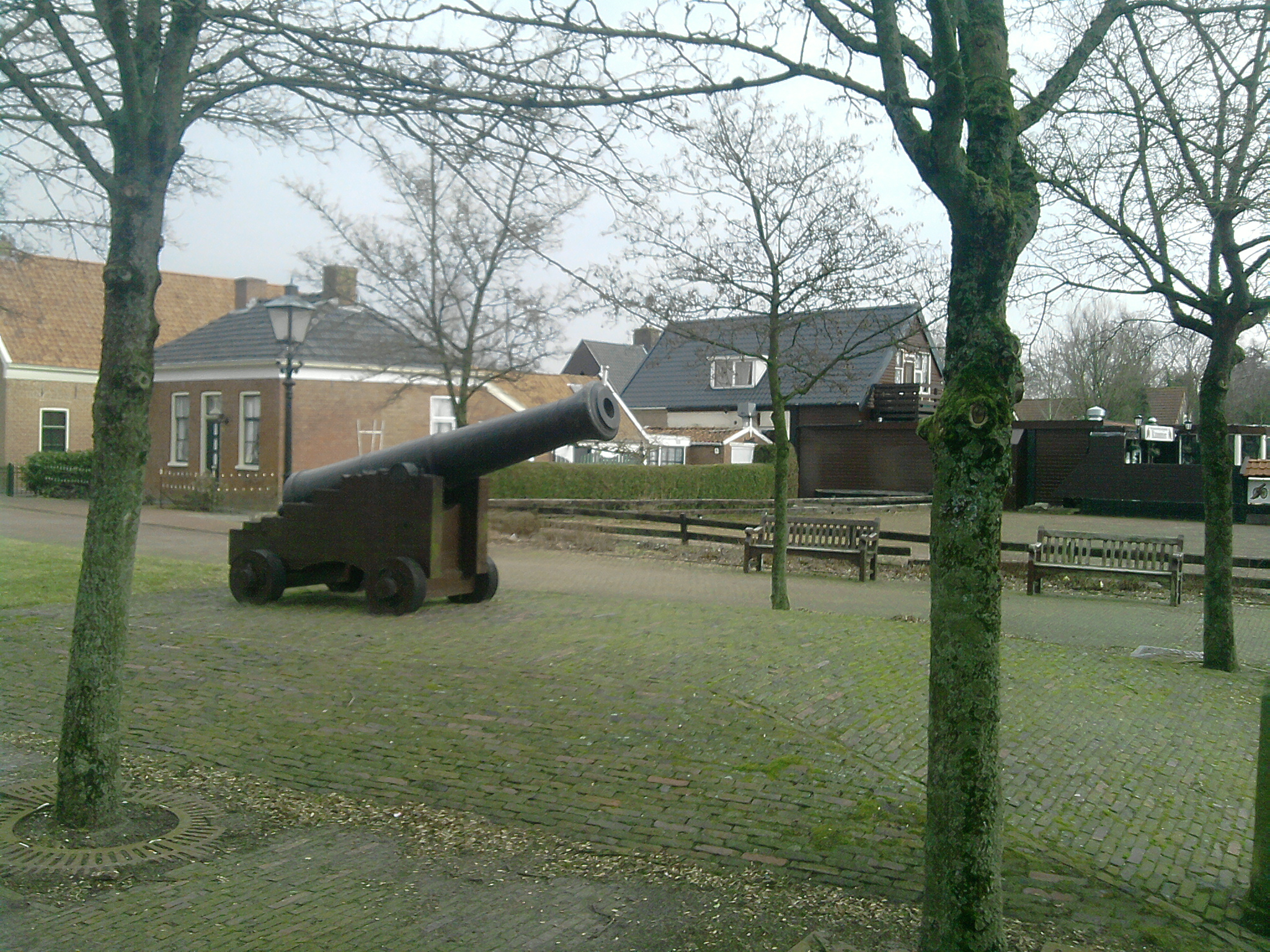
Cannon in Nieuweschans

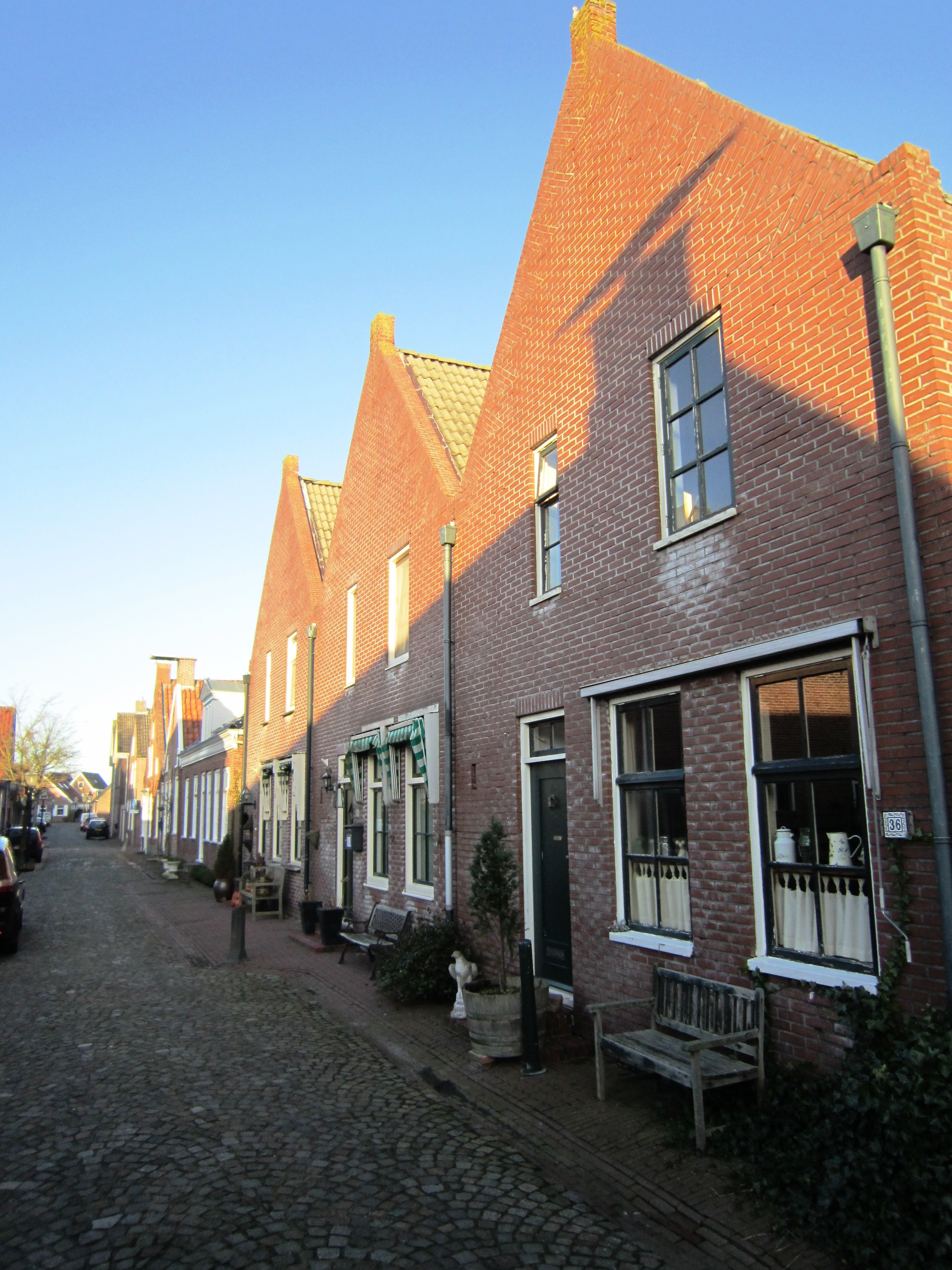
Village street

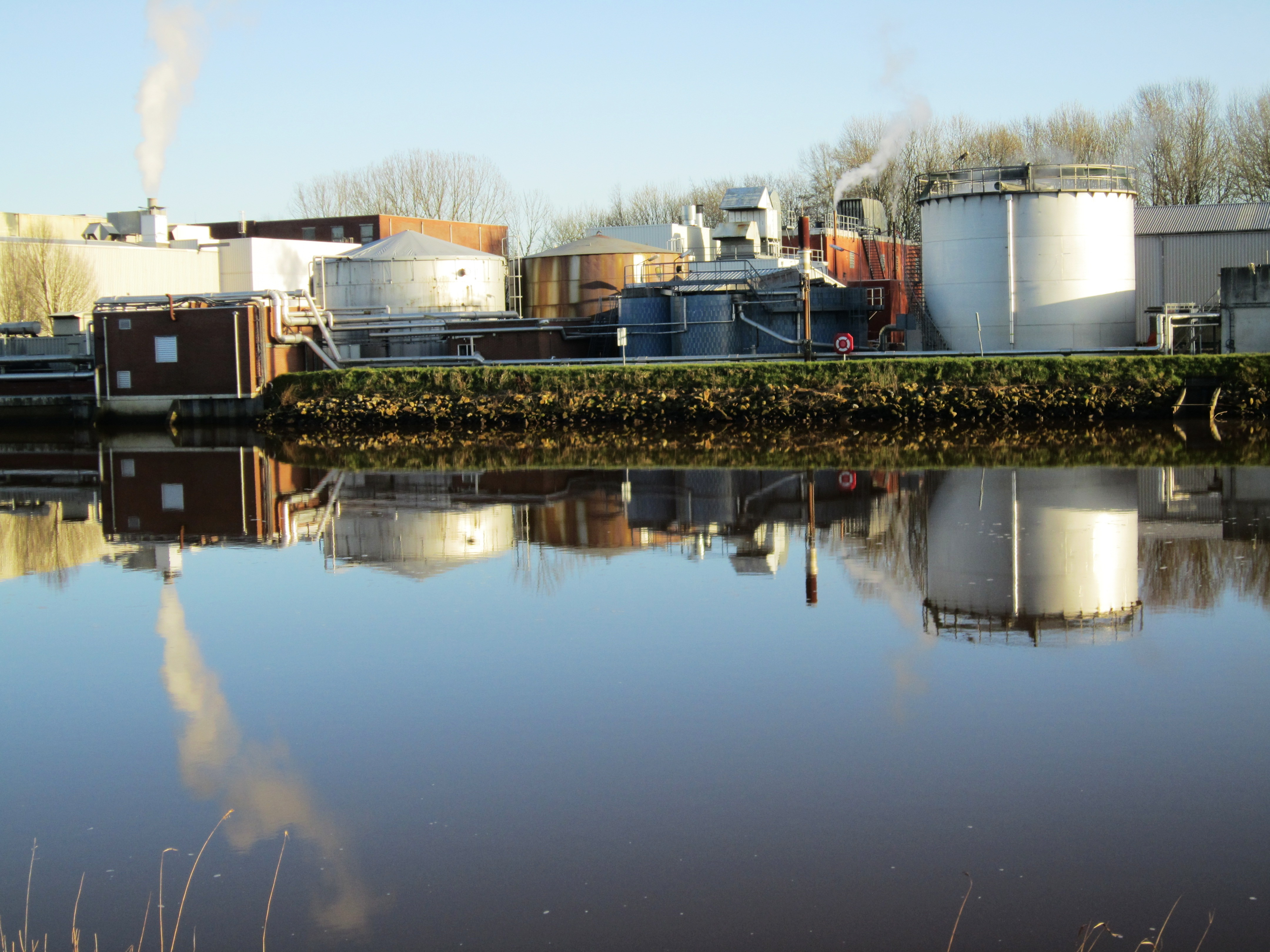
Industry

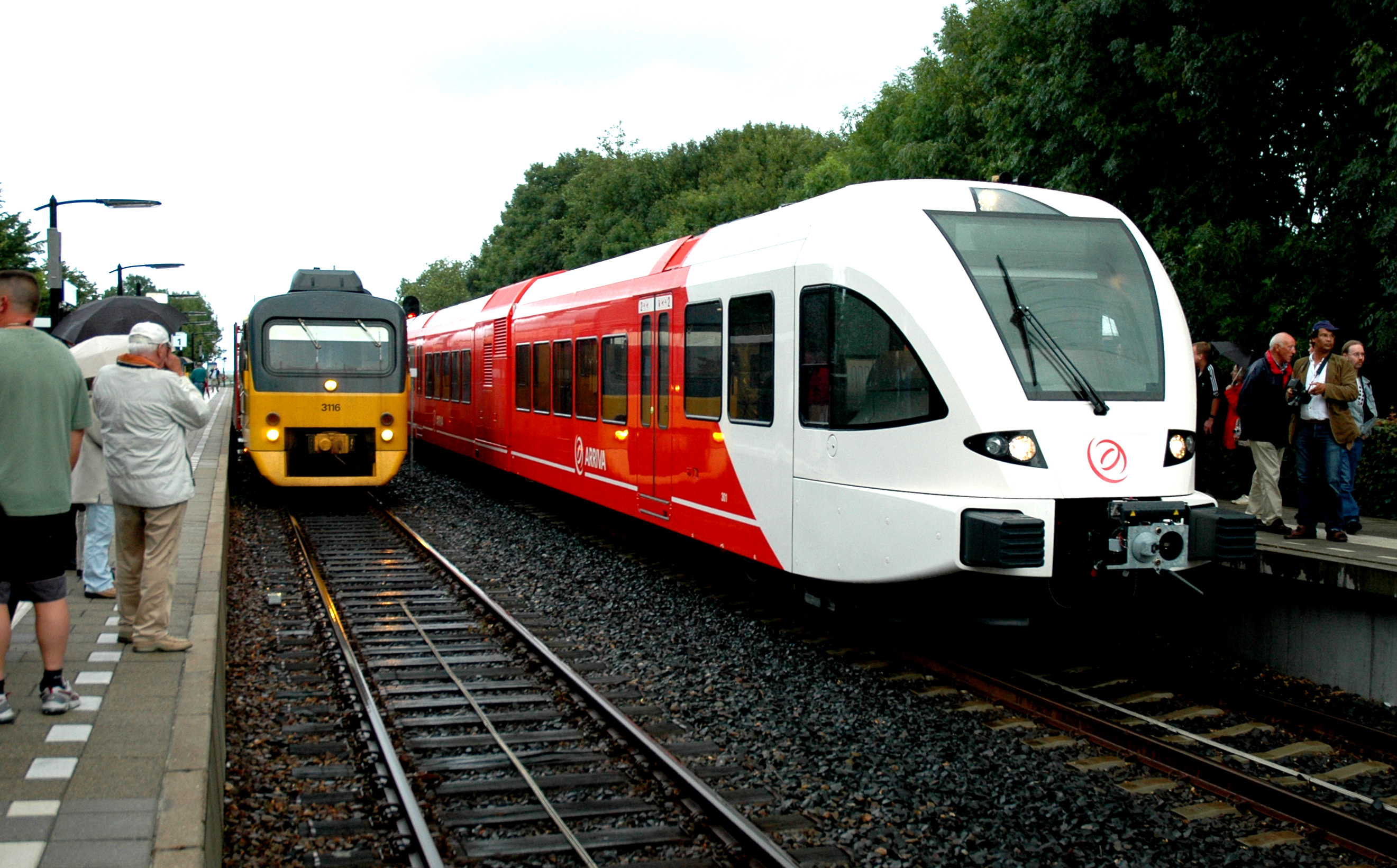
Old and new train at the station

== Bibliography ==
- Harkema, P.; Panman, M.H. (1990). Nieuweschans (PDF) (in Dutch). Monument Inventory Project.
