= N33 road (Netherlands) =

Road in the Netherlands

Provincial highway 33
- Provinciale weg 33
- Location of the N33

Route information
- Length: 72 km (45 mi)

Major junctions
- South end: A28 in Assen
- North end: Eemshaven

Location
- Country: Kingdom of the Netherlands
- Constituent country: Netherlands
- Provinces: Drenthe, Groningen

Highway system
- Roads in the Netherlands; Motorways; E-roads; Provincial; City routes

N33, or Rijksweg 33, is an expressway in the provinces of Groningen and Drenthe in the Netherlands.

The expressway is 72 kilometres (approximately 44.7 miles) long and starts in the municipality of Assen, Drenthe and ends in Eemshaven, Groningen.

The N33 had a reputation as a death road. In the northern Netherlands, a lobby had been going on for years to get the road widened to a full four-lane road between Assen and the junction with the A7 near Zuidbroek. The reconstruction should have started in 2011, but due to lack of funds it instead started in the spring of 2013.

The Delfzijl-Eemshaven section was rebuilt between 2000 and 2006: bypasses were built at Appingedam, Holwierde and Spijk. In 2011 the conversion of the traffic circle at Gieten was completed, so that the road was placed under the traffic circle. In 2012, the Minister of Infrastructure issued the planning procedures order for the doubling of the N33 between Assen and Noordbroek (A7). On December 27, 2012, all objections had been rejected and nothing stood in the way of doubling the N33. The doubling of the N33 between Assen and Zuidbroek was realized in three phases. In the first phase, the new carriageway was built alongside the existing carriageway and viaducts were widened and slip roads were modified. Traffic remained on the original N33 during this phase. In phase two, traffic used the new carriageway and the existing carriageway was rebuilt and overpasses are being modified. The slip roads of the N33 remained accessible to traffic at all times. In the final phase, the 2×2 lanes were ready and Rijkswaterstaat worked on arranging the central reservation, installing guide rail and applying the lines. With this approach, the road was modified by the end of 2014.

On May 12, 2014 and May 26, 2014, respectively, the doubled sections between Assen and Gieten and between Gieten and Veendam were opened after two nine-day closures. This was due to an acceleration of the work.
