= Zijpe =

- Former municipality
- Flag Coat of arms

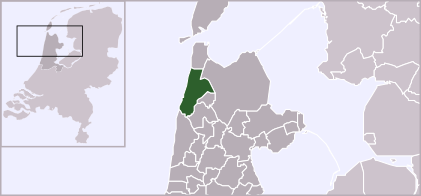
- Coordinates: 52.80°N 4.77°E
- Country: Netherlands
- Province: North Holland
- Municipality: Schagen

Area (2006)
  - Total: 113.35 km^{2} (43.76 sq mi)
  - Land: 95.17 km^{2} (36.75 sq mi)
  - Water: 18.18 km^{2} (7.02 sq mi)

Population (1 January 2007)
  - Total: 11,565
  - Density: 122/km^{2} (320/sq mi)
- Source: CBS, Statline.
- Time zone: UTC+1 (CET)
  - Summer (DST): UTC+2 (CEST)
- Website: www.zijpe.nl

Zijpe (Dutch pronunciation: [ˈzɛipə]) is a former municipality in the Netherlands, in the province of North Holland. In 2013, Zijpe and Harenkarspel merged into Schagen.

== Population centres ==
The former municipality of Zijpe consisted of the following small towns and villages: Burgerbrug, Burgervlotbrug, Callantsoog, Groote Keeten, Oudesluis, Petten, Schagerbrug, Sint Maartensbrug, Sint Maartensvlotbrug, 't Zand.

== Local government ==
The municipal council of Zijpe had 15 seats, which at the final election in 2010 divided as follows:

- Burger Kiesvereniging Zijpe (BKV) - 4 seats
- CDA - 3 seats
- VVD - 3 seats
- PvdA - 3 seats
- Natuurlijk Zijpe - 2 seats

Elections were held in November 2012 for a council for the new merged municipal council of Schagen that included Zijpe, which commenced work in January 2013.
