= Vlotbrug =

Special type of bridges at the Great North Holland Canal

Vlotbrug (plural, Dutch: vlotbruggen) translates from Dutch into English as "raft bridge". It is a special kind of floating retractable bridge, used at the Great North Holland Canal, which pivot either centrally or from one or both banks of a body of water to allow vessels to pass through.

In the Dutch province of North Holland, a vlotbrug is a retractable pontoon bridge which opens for water traffic by retracting in its long direction, with the roadway sliding under fixed structure(s) on canal bank(s). This article relates to bridges of that design. In the eastern Netherlands, a name for that design of bridge was scholle. (Note: "Scholle" seems to be, or at one time to have been, a local name for a type of flat-bottomed boat in at least one part of the Netherlands. See nl:Wierumerschouw.)

An animation of the generic mode of operation of retractable bridges.

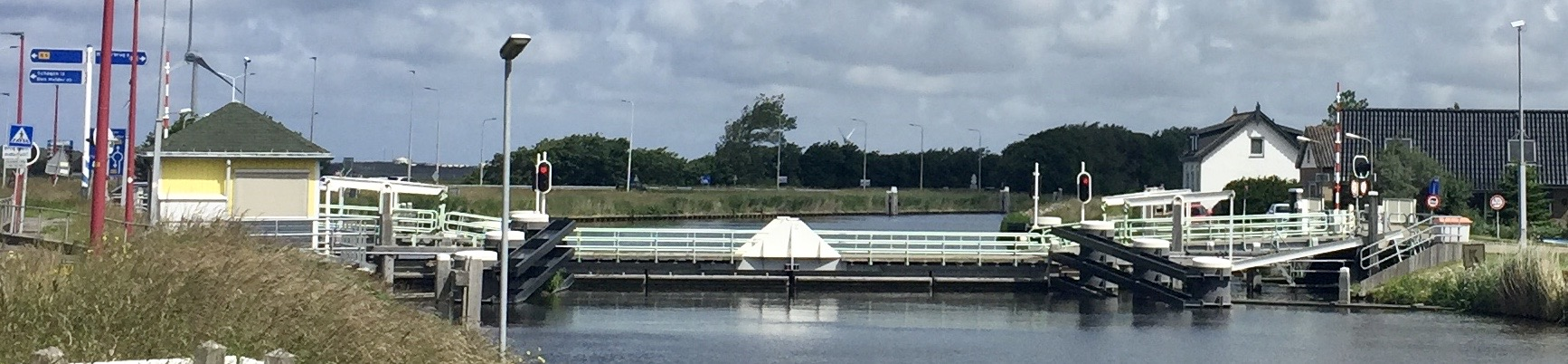
Burgervlotbrug closed

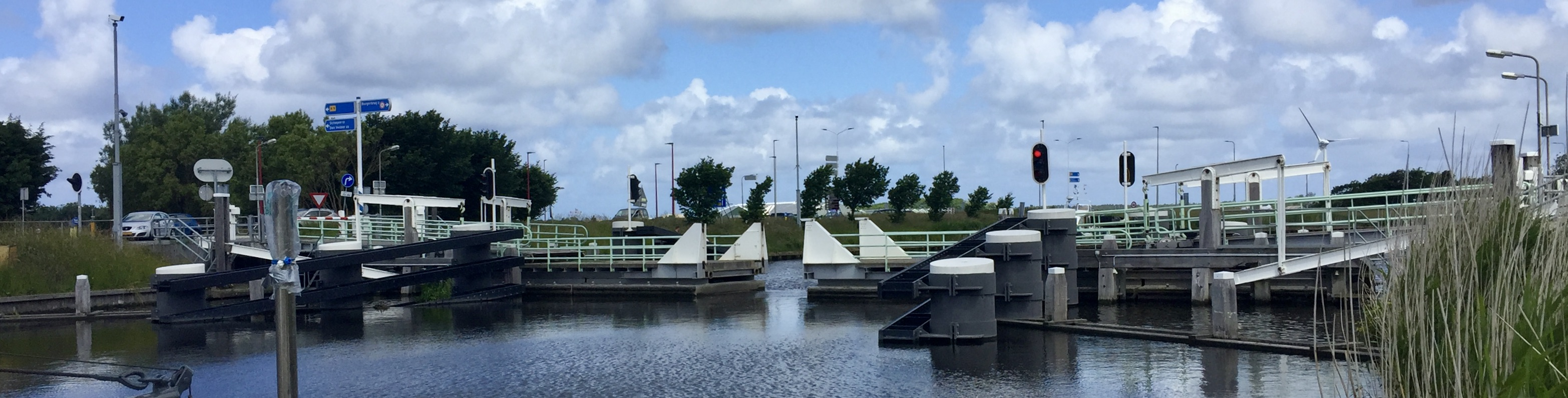
Burgervlotbrug opening

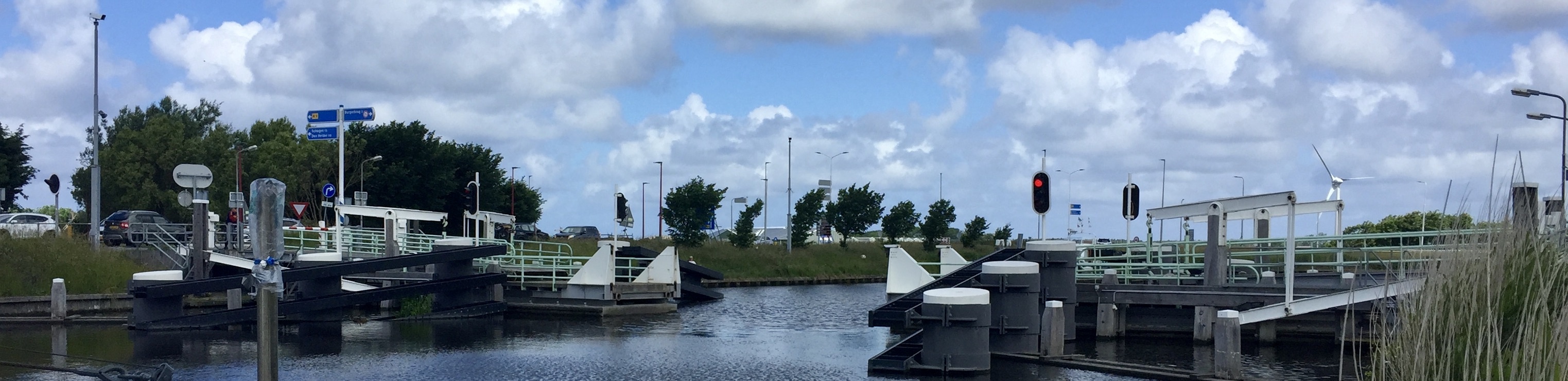
Burgervlotbrug opening II

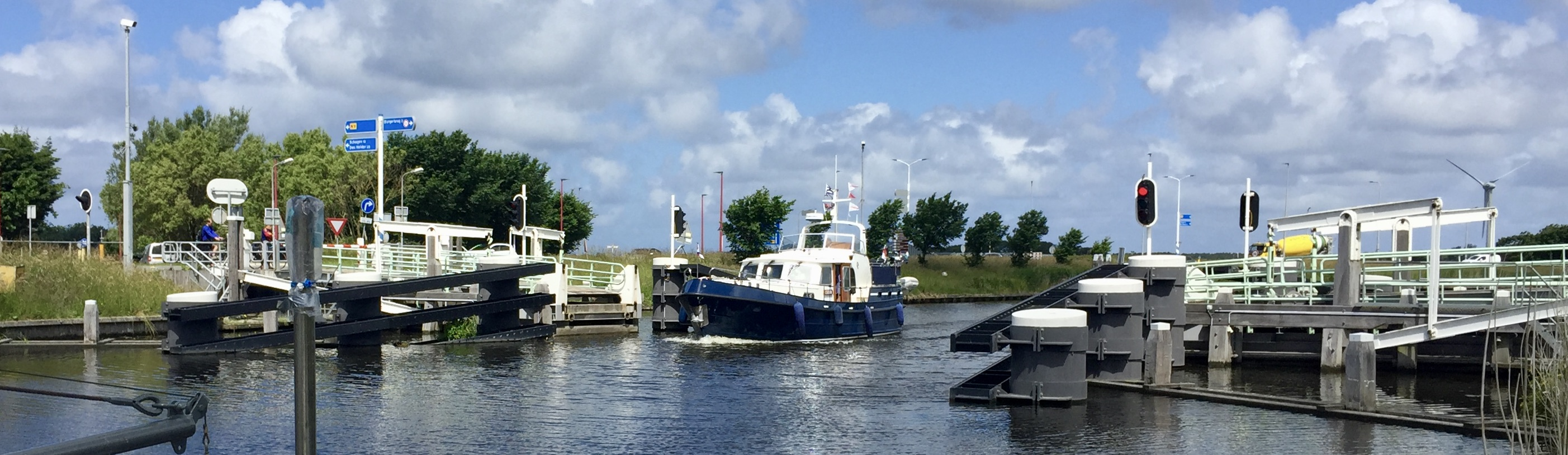
Burgervlotbrug open

== History and design ==
The Noordhollandsch Kanaal in North Holland was constructed 1820-1824. Many vlotbruggen were built across it at that time. For an uncertain reason, it was not possible to build known types of opening bridges such as drawbridges instead. (Note: An unsourced statement in Dutch Wikipedia suggests that the width of the canal was too great for the then-known designs of opening bridge. See nl:Noordhollandsch Kanaal) The apparent lack of earlier references suggests that the vlotbrug may then have been a novel idea.

One old, undated, photograph (see the Gallery, below: De Scholle, Vroomshoop, Overijssel province, eastern Netherlands) shows a canal with jetties on both banks connected by a moveable roadway. The roadway is wooden, is equipped with guard rails, and has upwardly-sloping portions at each end which communicate with the fixed structures. The horizontal part of the roadway is roughly 1 m (3 ft) above the water. The exact method of operation is unclear; for example, as to whether the roadway was moved by manpower or by draught animals, and as to whether the roadway was pulled up onto a jetty or was slid underneath a jetty, on water. It is also unclear whether the roadway had additional flotation devices. The roadway may have been simply a modified rectangular boat of the punt type (Dutch: vlet).

The names of the modern villages Burgervlotbrug and Sint Maartensvlotbrug in North Holland suggest they may have been new settlements around a vlotbrug. They are close to the previously existing villages Burgerbrug and Sint Maartensbrug. The names of the neighbourhoods Stolpervlotbrug, near De Stolpen in North Holland, and of Vlotbrug in Hellevoetsluis and Tweede Vlotbrug in Nissewaard, both in South Holland province, may have had similar origins.

More recent photographs and videos of vlotbruggen are clearer than the old photograph of De Scholle at Vroomshoop. The first vlotbruggen were of wood. Modern bridges are of steel, and are operated mechanically. The roadway is divided into two in the middle of the waterway, and its two sections withdraw under fixed structures on either side. The bridges have safety features such as moveable barriers which block the roadway to land traffic, and traffic lights and sound signals to alert both land and water traffic. They are equipped with fenders based on piles driven into the canal bed, to protect the fixed structures against accidental damage from watercraft.

The vlotbrug design is not without risk of accidents, especially since the introduction of motorised vehicles. Both land and water vehicles have been involved. In the 1960s or 1970s, the vlotbrug at Sint Maartensvlotbrug was damaged while a lorry was crossing. It has been said that the lorry was overloaded. In 1988, the vlotbrug at 't Zand was damaged when a lorry toppled over while crossing it. In 1999, the vlotbrug at Burgervlotbrug was damaged when a heavily laden lorry attempted to cross it. Repairs took several months. After an accident in 2012 at Burgervlotbrug (for which the skipper of a river barge was blamed), it was asked whether or not vlotbruggen have a place in the 21st century. Opinion was divided. In 2017, the vlotbrug at Burgervlotbrug was damaged when a freighter collided with one of the fenders protecting the bridge.

== Operating vlotbruggen ==
As of 2017, five operating vlotbruggen exist, all crossing the Noordhollandsch Kanaal in North Holland. From south to north (i.e. in the seawards direction):

- Koedijkervlotbrug, Koedijk, Alkmaar
- Rekervlotbrug, Koedijk, Alkmaar (named after Rekere, a former river which is now part of the Noordhollandsch Kanaal)
- Vlotbrug, Burgervlotbrug, Schagen
- Vlotbrug, Sint Maartensvlotbrug, Schagen
- Vlotbrug, 't Zand, Schagen

Rekervlotbrug was built in 2010. Because of technical problems, it was not brought fully into service that year. The other four bridges are modernised versions of ones built in the 19th century. Koedijkervlotbrug is open only to pedestrians and cyclists. The others accept some mechanised vehicles also.

== Gallery ==
=== North Holland ===
Vlotbrug, Heiligland, Alkmaar (1919)

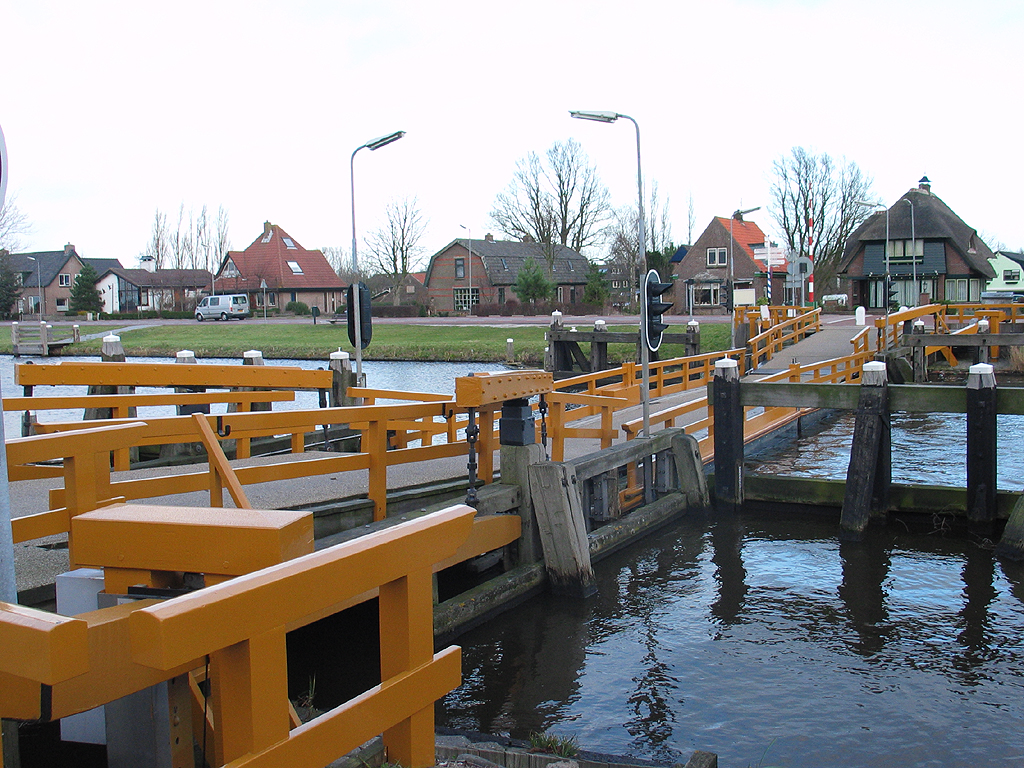
Koedijkervlotbrug, Koedijk, Alkmaar

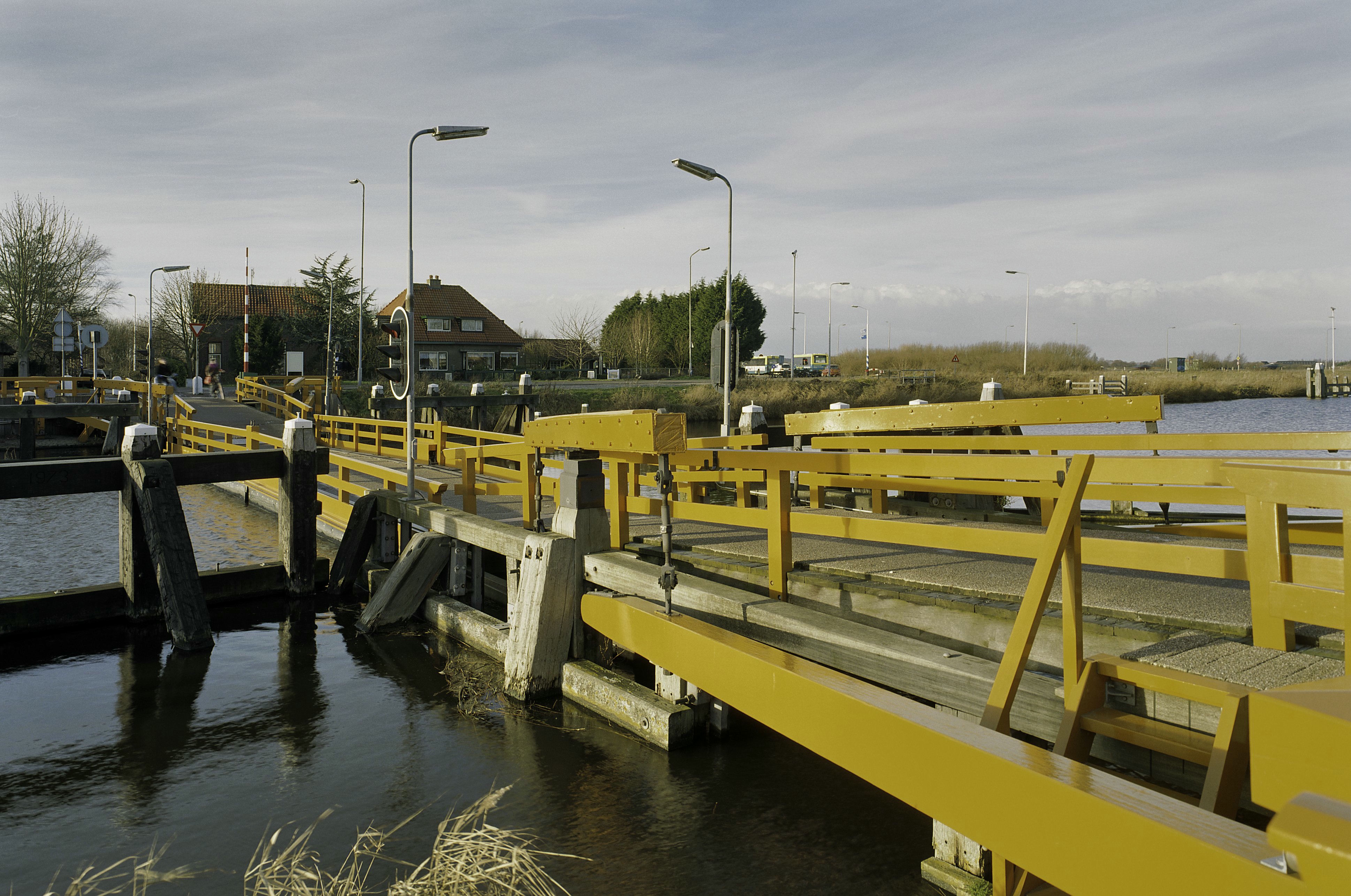
Koedijkervlotbrug, Koedijk, Alkmaar

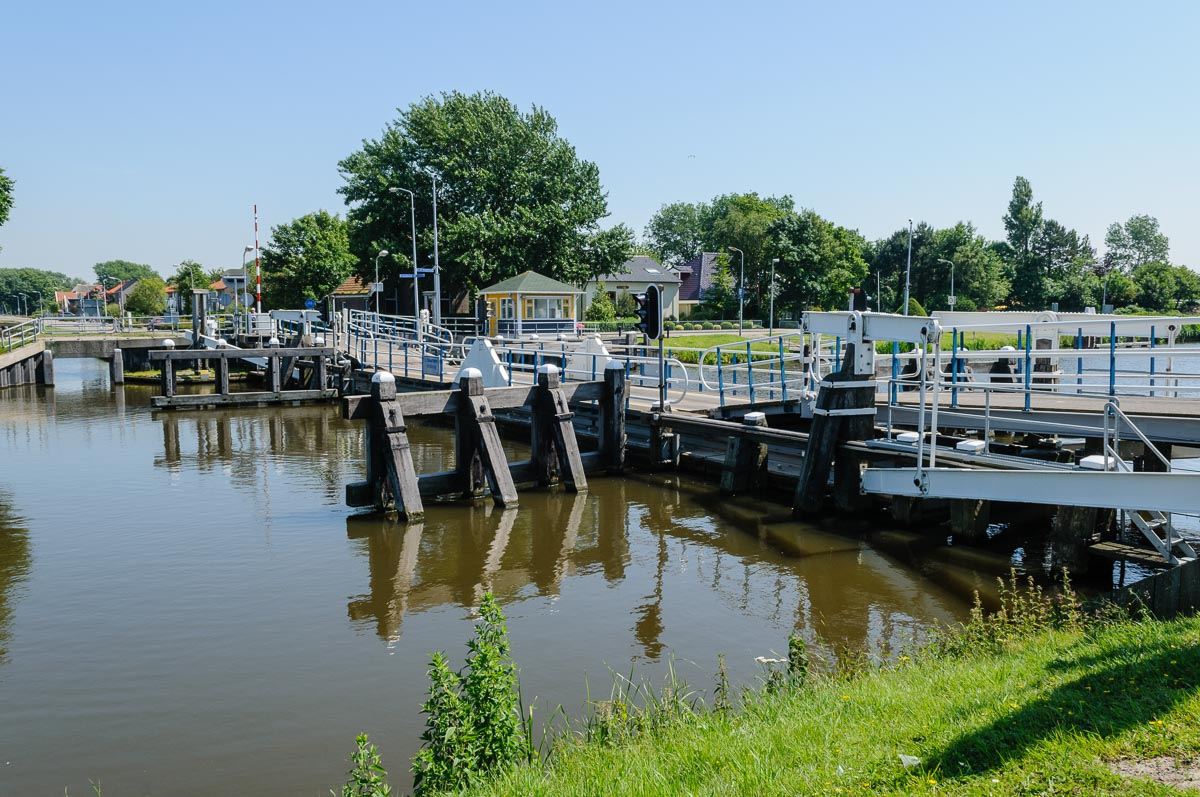
Vlotbrug, Sint Maartensvlotbrug, Schagen

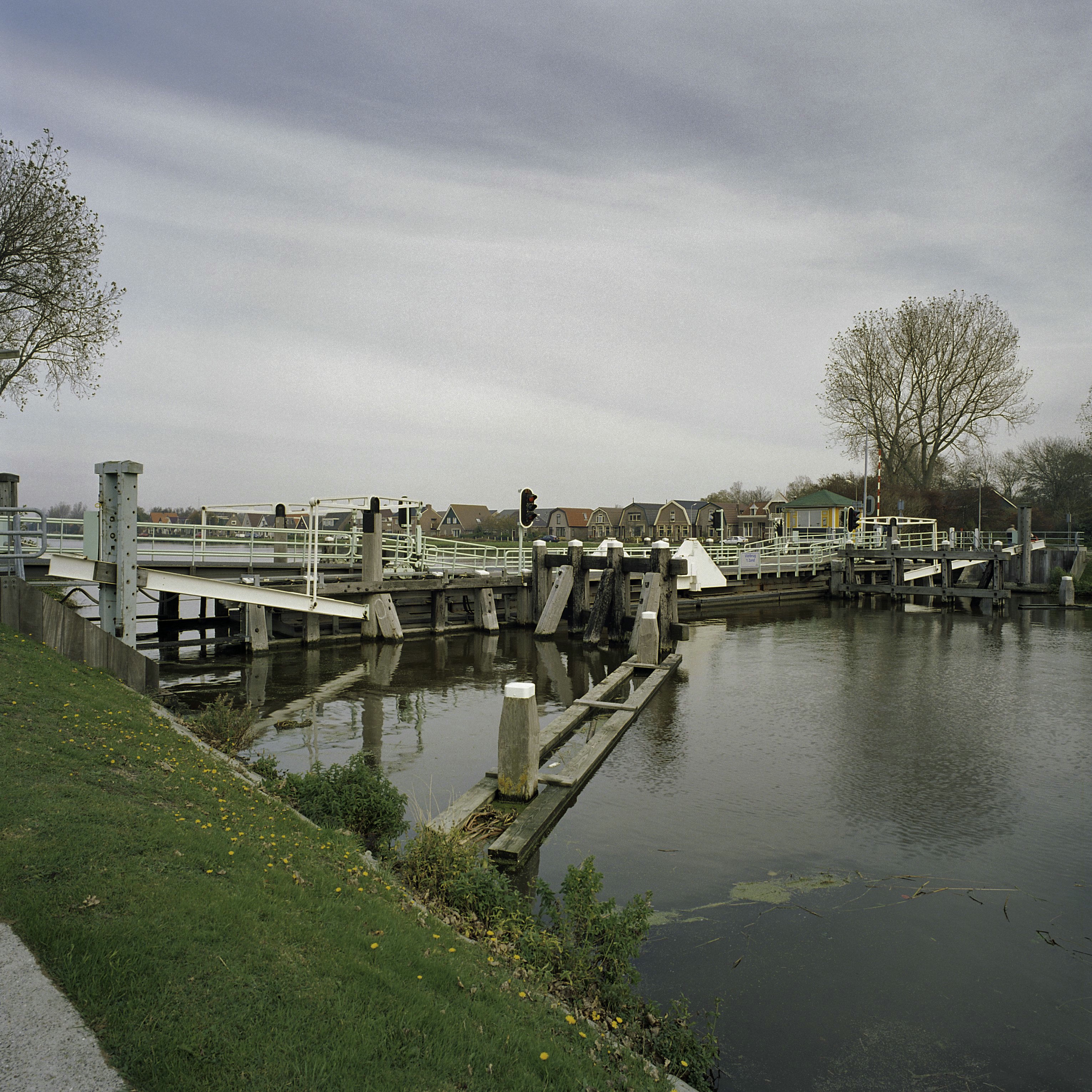
Vlotbrug, 't Zand, Schagen

=== Elsewhere ===
Vlotbrug, Hellevoetsluis, South Holland

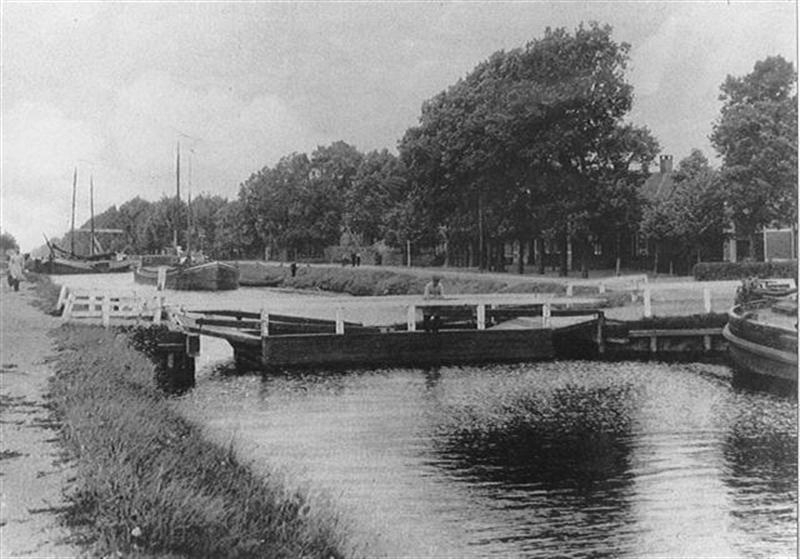
De Scholle, Vroomshoop, Overijssel

== See also ==
- Moveable bridge
