= A9 motorway (Netherlands) =

Road in the Netherlands

A9 motorway
- Rijksweg 9
- Location of the A9 motorway (including N9 section)

Location
- Country: Kingdom of the Netherlands
- Constituent country: Netherlands

Highway system
- Roads in the Netherlands; Motorways; E-roads; Provincial; City routes

The A9 motorway is a motorway in the Netherlands. The motorway starts off by going from the A1 at Diemen (junction Diemen) to the A2 at junction 'Holendrecht' (on the 'Gaasperdammerweg').

== Overview ==
Here one drives approximately two kilometers south by means of the combined A9/A2 before the A9 heads off to the west again towards Amstelveen, junction 'Badhoevedorp' (A4), junction 'Raasdorp' (A5), junction 'Rottepolderplein' (A200) and on to junction 'Velsen' (A22). Hereafter, the A9 goes further northward by means of the Wijkertunnel under the North Sea Canal, junction 'Beverwijk' (A22) to Alkmaar. At this point, the A9 motorway becomes the N9 highway and proceeds until De Kooy (at Den Helder).

In 1996, the Wijkertunnel was opened and integrated into the A9. The original route of the A9 ran through the Velsertunnel where there is also a connection with the A208. This part still exists but this portion of motorway has been re-numbered to A22.

The part between A1 and A2 is four lanes; between A2 and Rottepolderplein it is six lanes. Hereafter the way is mainly four lanes, with short pieces in the area of the Wijkertunnel that are six lanes.

With regard to the Gaasperdammerweg, it is noted in the original plans that this road would not become a motorway. The plan was to build a local link-road for the occupants of the Bijlmermeer. The section between A2/A9 and A1/A6 was never built, although this would have formed a natural connection between A9 and A6. Because of this, the Gaasperdammerweg has developed into an overflowing connection between A2 and A1.

Discussions on extending the A9 in a straight line to the A6 are still going on. Because this part of the route would pass by the Naardermeer, environmentalists oppose this plan.

== Exit list ==
The entire route is in North Holland Province.

Municipality	km	mi	Exit	Name	Destinations	Notes
Diemen	5	3.1	—	Interchange Diemen	E231 / A 1 / S 114	
Amsterdam	6	3.7	1	Weesp	N 236 southeast / S 113 northwest	
Amsterdam	9	5.6	2	Amsterdam-Bijlmermeer	S 112	
Amsterdam	10	6.2	3	Amsterdam-Zuidoost	S 111	
Amsterdam	11– 23	6.8– 14	—	Interchange Holendrecht	E35 / A 2	Gap in km due to intersection with A2
Amstelveen	27	17	4	Ouderkerk a/d/ Amstel	N 522 northeast	
Amstelveen	29	18	5	Amstelveen	S 108 north	
Aalsmeer	32	20	6	Aalsmeer	N 231 south / N 232	
Haarlemmermeer	34	21	—	Interchange Badhoevedorp	E19 / A 4	
Haarlemmermeer	37	23	7	Badhoevedorp	S 106 north	
Haarlemmermeer	40	25	—	Interchange Raasdorp	A 5	
Haarlem	42	26	—	Interchange Rottepolderplein / Halfweg / Haarlem-Zuid	A 200 / N 205	
Velsen	47	29	—	Interchange Velsen	A 22 north	Northbound exit and southbound entrance only
Beverwijk	54	34	8	Bazaar / Zaanstad	N 246 south	
Beverwijk	55	34	—	Interchange Beverwijk	A 22 southwest	Southbound exit and northbound entrance only
Heemskerk	58	36	9	Heemskerk	Communicatieweg	
Castricum	59	37	10	Castricum	N 8 southeast / N 203 northwest	
Castricum	62	39	11	Akersloot	Geesterweg	
Alkmaar	70	43	12	Ring Alkmaar	N 9 northwest / N 242 northeast	
1.000 mi = 1.609 km; 1.000 km = 0.621 mi: Incomplete access

== Route description of the N9 highway ==
From the last exit of the A9 motorway, the road becomes a highway (called N9) and continues along:

- Alkmaar
- Schoorl
- Schagerbrug
- 't Zand
- Julianadorp
- De Kooy
