= A200 =

A200, A.200, or A-200 may refer to:

- A200 motorway (Netherlands)
- Mercedes-Benz A-Class
- A200 road, a route in south east London from London Bridge to Greenwich
- Aero A.200, a sportsplane of Czechoslovakia from 1934
- A200 Platform; see Sony Ericsson
- Toshiba Satellite A200, a laptop produced by Toshiba
- Konica Minolta DiMAGE A200, a digital bridge camera
- DSLR-A200 aka Sony α200, a digital SLR with A-mount in the Sony Alpha camera system
- A-200, an entity that originates from Roblox game "Rooms"
