= A22 motorway (Netherlands) =

Road in the Netherlands

A22 motorway
- Rijksweg 22
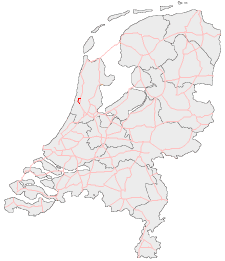
- Location of the A22 motorway

Major junctions
- North end: A9 in Velsen
- South end: A9 in Beverwijk

Location
- Country: Kingdom of the Netherlands
- Constituent country: Netherlands
- Provinces: North Holland

Highway system
- Roads in the Netherlands; Motorways; E-roads; Provincial; City routes

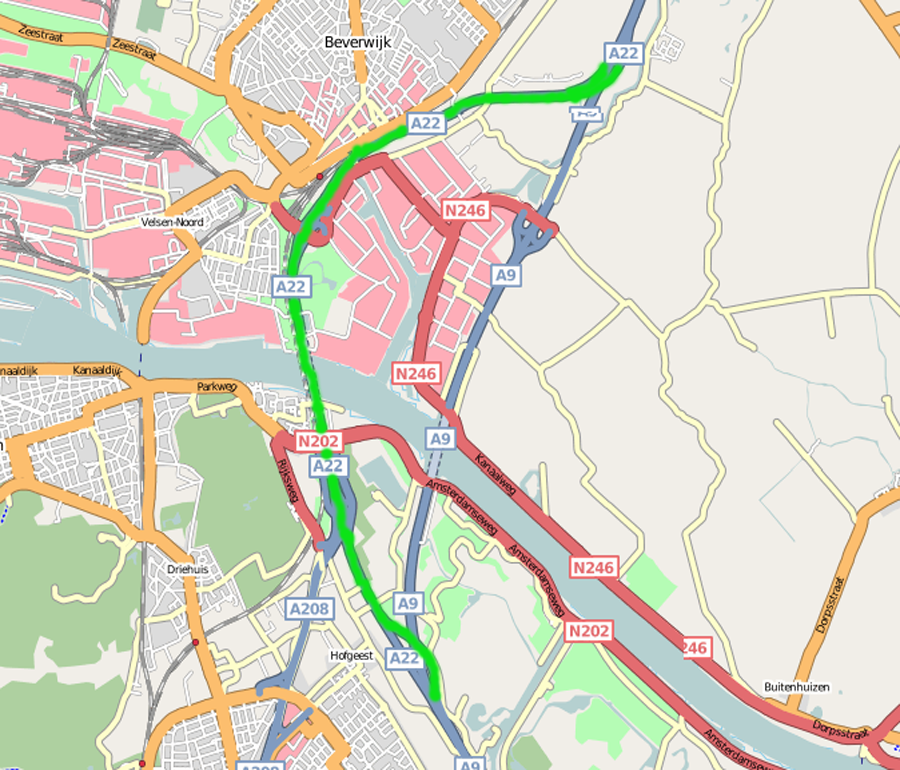
A detailed map of the A22 motorway (in green).

The A22 motorway is a motorway in the Netherlands. It is one of the shorter motorways in the Netherlands, with a total length of approximately 8 kilometers.

The A22 starts at the interchange Velsen, where it splits from the A9 motorway. After interchange IJmuiden, exit IJmuiden, the Velsertunnel, and exit Beverwijk, it rejoins with the A9 motorway at the interchange Beverwijk.

== Wijkertunnel ==
Until 1996, the entire A22 motorway was part of the A9, but due to the rising capacity problems in and around the Velsertunnel, it was decided to build an additional tunnel about a kilometer east of the Velsertunnel: the Wijkertunnel. When this tunnel was finished, the new road section and tunnel became part of the A9, while the old road and tunnel were renumbered to A22. Both the new and the old tunnel have two lanes in each direction.

== Exit list ==
The entire route is in North Holland Province.

Municipality	km	mi	Exit	Destinations	Notes
Velsen			—	A 9 – Zwanenburg, Badhoevedorp	
Velsen			1	N 202 southeast / N 208 southwest – Velserbroek, Haarlem, Westpoort	
Beverwijk			2	N 197 – Beverwijk, Velsen-Noord	
Beverwijk			—	A 9 – Uitgeest	No southbound exit
1.000 mi = 1.609 km; 1.000 km = 0.621 mi
