= S113 =

S113 may refer to:

- SMS S113, an Imperial German Navy torpedo boat
- Scania S113, a model of Scania buses
- S113 road in Amsterdam
