= De Stolpen =

- Hamlet
- Location in the Netherlands Location in the province of North Holland in the Netherlands
- Coordinates: 52°48′44″N 4°43′47″E
- Country: Netherlands
- Province: North Holland
- Municipality: Schagen

Area
  - Total: 3.72 km^{2} (1.44 sq mi)
- Elevation: −0.2 m (−0.66 ft)

Population (2025)
  - Total: 200
  - Density: 54/km^{2} (140/sq mi)
- Time zone: UTC+1 (CET)
  - Summer (DST): UTC+2 (CEST)
- Postal code: 1751
- Dialing code: 0224

De Stolpen (sometimes just "Stolpen") is a hamlet in the Dutch province of North Holland. It is part of the municipality of Schagen, and is located about 3 km northwest of the village of Schagerbrug.

In 2005, the municipal council of the former municipality of Zijpe decided that the N9 road had to be moved; as a consequence, all of the houses in De Stolpen would have to be demolished. The national government changed this decision in December 2006, which saved the hamlet. This saved what is essentially a row of a few contiguous homes on the north side of the road.
