= S111 (Amsterdam) =

City route in Amsterdam, the Netherlands

City route 111
- Stadsroute 111

Major junctions
- South end: E35 / A 2 / A 9 – Amsterdam
- North end: S 112 – Amsterdam

Location
- Country: Kingdom of the Netherlands
- Constituent country: Netherlands
- Provinces: North Holland
- Municipalities: Amsterdam, Ouder-Amstel

Highway system
- Roads in the Netherlands; Motorways; E-roads; Provincial; City routes

S111 is a Dutch city route in Amsterdam. S111 is roughly 4 miles (6.4 kilometers) and is connected to S112. The S111 connects the Julianaplein (in front of the Amstel station) and the S112 with the A10, Villa Arena ( a shopping center) in the Bijlmermeer and the A9. Next, the road makes a loop past the Academic Medical Center, and once again connects to the A9. The road is sequentially called Julianaplein, Overzichtweg, Spaklerweg, Holterbergweg, Muntbergweg and Meibergdreef.

== Notes ==
Map
