= Burgervlotbrug =

- Hamlet
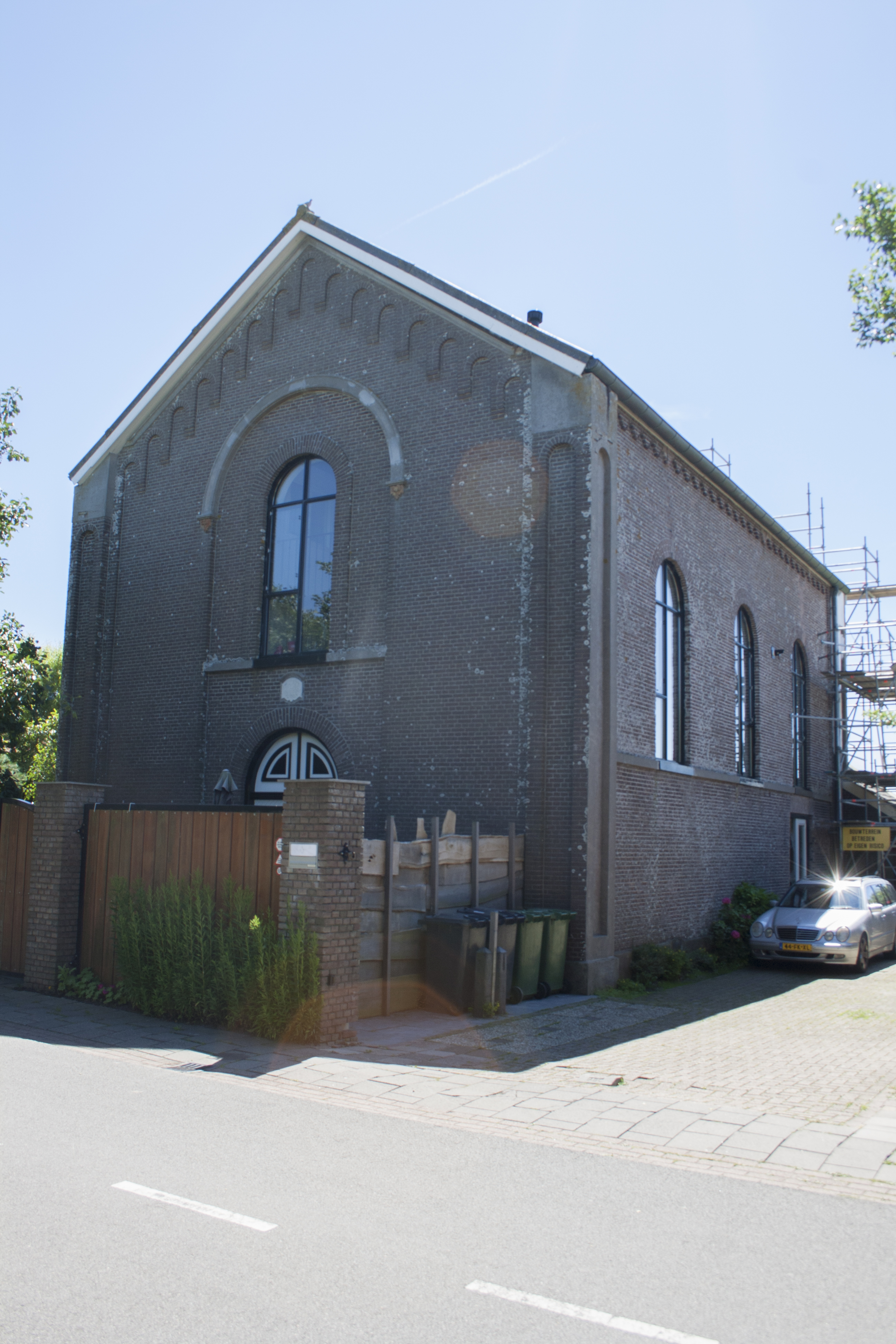
- Former Mennonite church

- Location in the Netherlands Location in the province of North Holland in the Netherlands
- Coordinates: 52°45′11″N 4°40′54″E
- Country: Netherlands
- Province: North Holland
- Municipality: Schagen

Area
  - Total: 4.13 km^{2} (1.59 sq mi)
- Elevation: 1.0 m (3.3 ft)

Population (2025)
  - Total: 185
  - Density: 44.8/km^{2} (116/sq mi)
- Time zone: UTC+1 (CET)
  - Summer (DST): UTC+2 (CEST)
- Postal code: 1754
- Dialing code: 0226

Burgervlotbrug is a hamlet in the Dutch province of North Holland. It is a part of the municipality of Schagen, and lies about 15 km north of Alkmaar.

Burgervlotbrug is considered part of Burgerbrug. It has place name signs.

The village is named after a floating bridge ("vlotbrug" in Dutch) in the Noordhollandsch Kanaal. The bridge is still in operation. There is a little Mennonite church from 1869 which is nowadays a residential home.
