= A200 motorway (Netherlands) =

Freeway in the Netherlands

A200 motorway
- Rijksweg 200
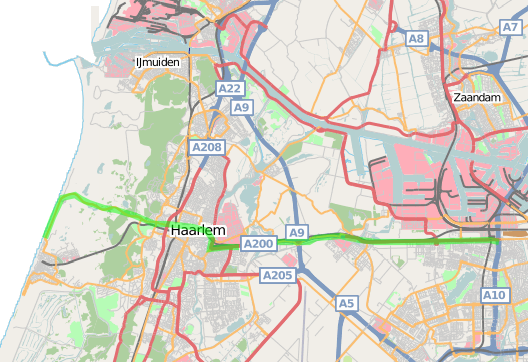

Location
- Country: Kingdom of the Netherlands
- Constituent country: Netherlands
- Provinces: North Holland

Highway system
- Roads in the Netherlands; Motorways; E-roads; Provincial; City routes

A200 is a motorway in the Netherlands. It runs from Halfweg to Haarlem.

== Exit list ==
The entire route is in North Holland Province.

Municipality	km	mi	Exit	Name	Destinations	Notes
Haarlemmermeer					N 200 east	This road continues as N200
Haarlemmermeer				Interchange Rottepolderplein	R 105 northeast	
Haarlemmermeer					A 9	
Haarlem					N 200 west / R 106 north / Camera Obscuraweg	This road continues as N200
1.000 mi = 1.609 km; 1.000 km = 0.621 mi
