= S113 (Amsterdam) =

City route in Amsterdam, the Netherlands

City route 113
- Stadsroute 113

Major junctions
- East end: A 9 / N 236 – Amsterdam

- West end: S 100 – Amsterdam

Location
- Country: Kingdom of the Netherlands
- Constituent country: Netherlands
- Provinces: North Holland
- Municipalities: Amsterdam

Highway system
- Roads in the Netherlands; Motorways; E-roads; Provincial; City routes

S113 is a Dutch city route in Amsterdam. It connects the A9 at Gaasperdam with the S100 inner circle route at Linneausstraat in Amsterdam-Oost.
