= Sint Maartensvlotbrug =

- Village
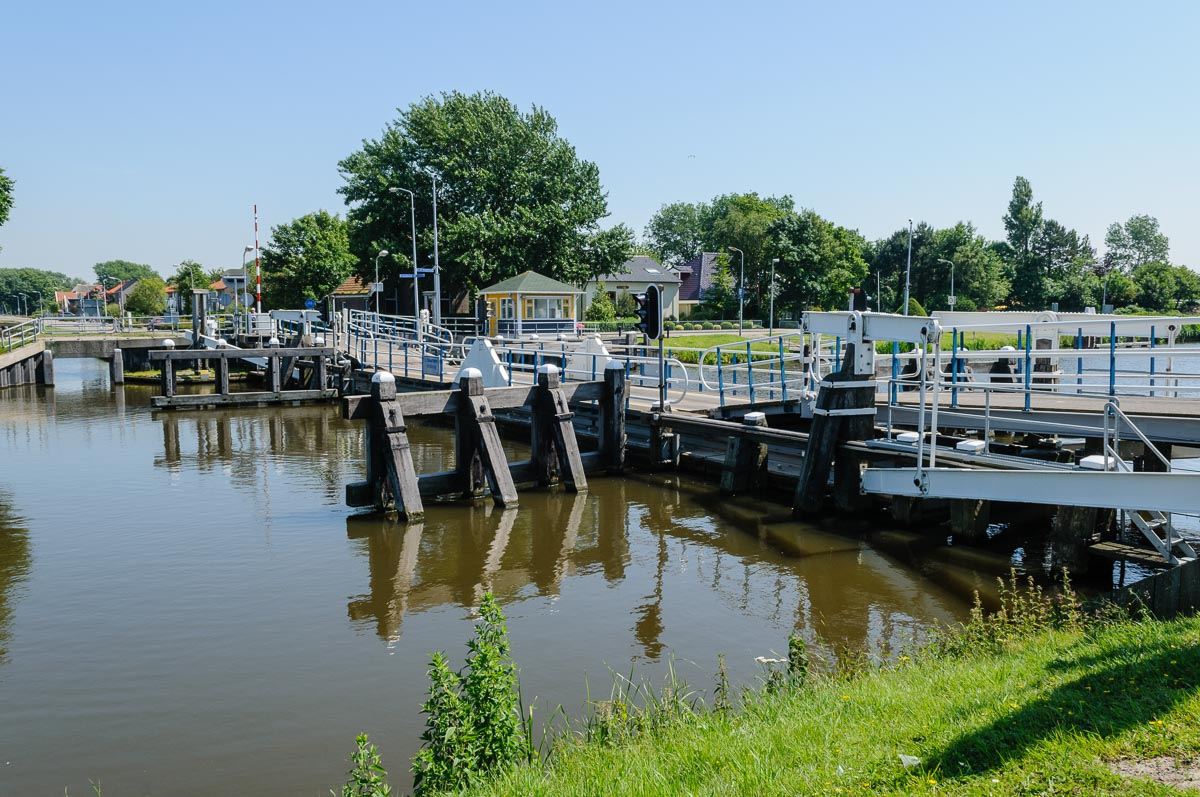
- Raft bridge at Sint Maartensvlotbrug

- Location in the Netherlands Location in the province of North Holland in the Netherlands
- Coordinates: 52°47′N 4°42′E
- Country: Netherlands
- Province: North Holland
- Municipality: Schagen

Area
  - Village: 6.28 km^{2} (2.42 sq mi)
- Elevation: 1.1 m (3.6 ft)

Population (2025)
  - Village: 625
  - Density: 99.5/km^{2} (258/sq mi)
  - Urban: 255
  - Rural: 370
- Time zone: UTC+1 (CET)
  - Summer (DST): UTC+2 (CEST)
- Postal code: 1753
- Dialing code: 0224

Sint Maartensvlotbrug is a village in the Dutch province of North Holland. It is a part of the municipality of Schagen, and lies about 15 km northwest of Heerhugowaard.

The village is named after a vlotbrug constructed near the village of Sint Maartensbrug. Originally it was a wooden bridge built between 1820 and 1821. In 1959, it was replaced by a steel pontoon bridge operated by an electro motor. The village was first mentioned between 1839 and 1859.
