= S112 (Amsterdam) =

City route in Amsterdam, the Netherlands

City route 112
- Stadsroute 112

Major junctions
- South end: S 111 – Amsterdam-Zuidoost

- North end: S 110 – Amsterdam

Location
- Country: Kingdom of the Netherlands
- Constituent country: Netherlands
- Provinces: North Holland
- Municipalities: Amsterdam, Diemen, Ouder-Amstel

Highway system
- Roads in the Netherlands; Motorways; E-roads; Provincial; City routes

S112 is a Dutch city route in Amsterdam. It is the south-east exit route. For motor vehicles, it connects the S100 inner circle route around Amsterdam-Centrum from Mr. Visserplein to the south-east at exit 12 of the A10 ring road around Amsterdam.
