= Sony Alpha 200 =

Sony α 200
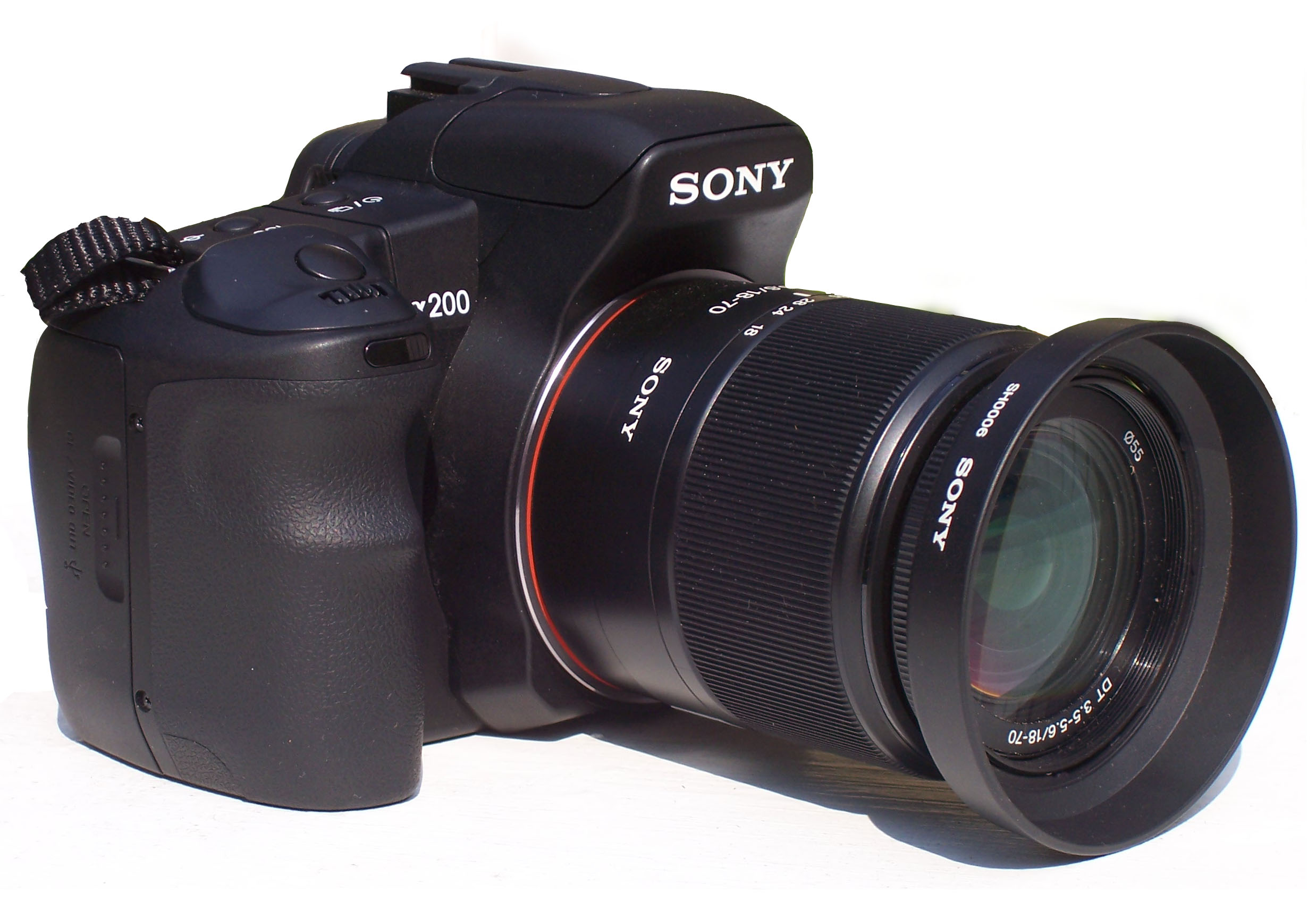

Overview
- Maker: Sony
- Type: Digital single-lens reflex camera

Lens
- Lens: interchangeable, Sony α / Konica Minolta A mount

Sensor/medium
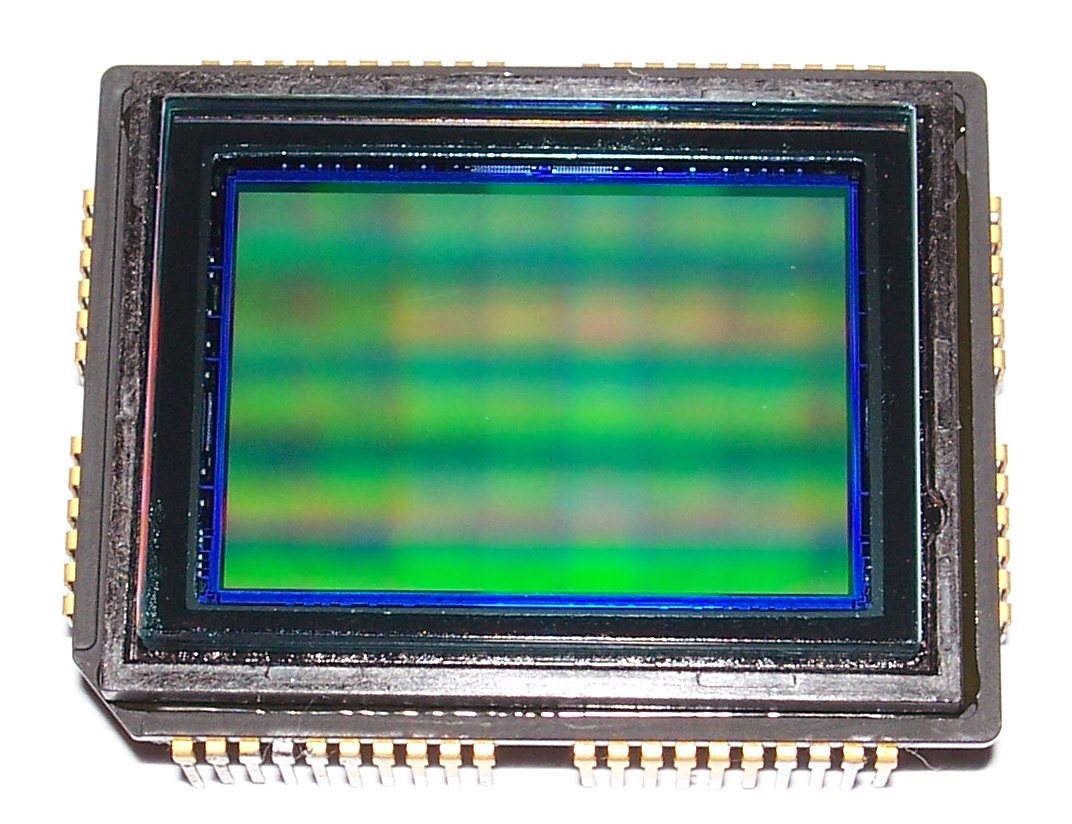
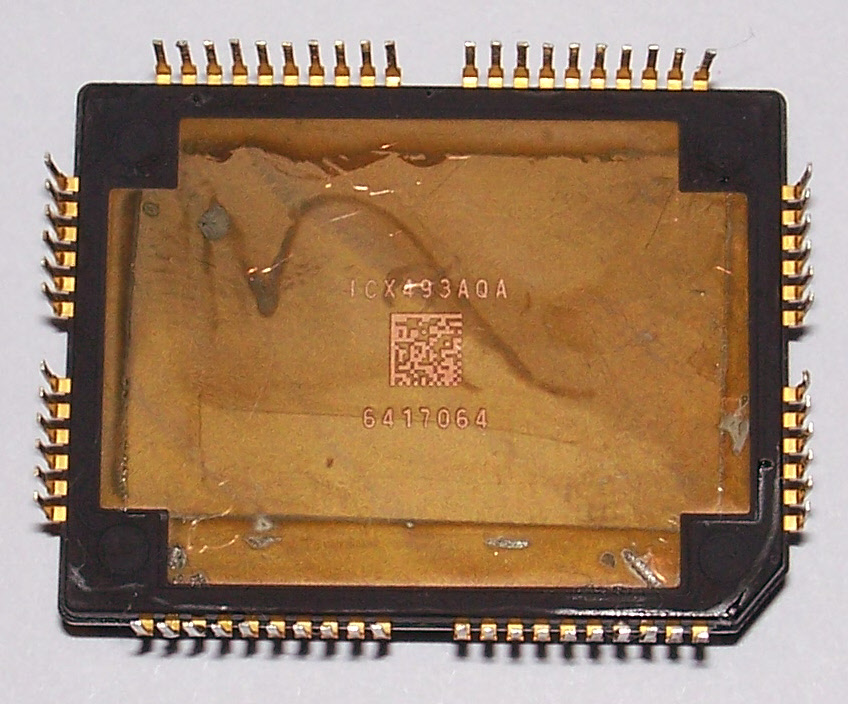
- Sensor: 23.6 mm × 15.8 mm, 10.2 effective megapixels CCD, 1.5 × FOV crop Sensor side Pins side Sony ICX493AQA 10.14-megapixel APS-C (23.4 x 15.6 mm) CCD from Alpha 200 or 300
- Maximum resolution: 3872 × 2592 pixels
- Film speed: Auto, 100, 200, 400, 800, 1600, 3200
- Storage media: CompactFlash I/II, Memory Stick PRO (with adapter), Memory Stick PRO Duo (with adapter)

Focusing
- Focus modes: manual focus point selection, Spot AF, Continuous AF and AF Lock
- Focus areas: 9-points center cross-hair sensor

Exposure/metering
- Exposure modes: Full Manual, Program Auto, Aperture Priority, Shutter Priority, ±2.0 EV, 1/3 EV Steps Exposure Compensation, 3 frames bracketing
- Exposure metering: 40-segment honeycomb sensing system provides multi-pattern measuring
- Metering modes: Multi-segment, Center-weighted, Spot

Flash
- Flash: Manual Pop-up: Auto, Fill-flash, Rear flash sync, Wireless off camera flash (with Flash HVL-F56AM, F36AM), GN12 at ISO 100 (39 feet/ 12 meters)

Shutter
- Shutter: electronically controlled, vertical-traverse, focal-plane Shutter
- Shutter speed range: 30 – 1/4000 sec, with Bulb, 1/160 sec X-sync
- Continuous shooting: 3 Frames Per Second, unlimited JPEG, up to 6 RAW, up to 3 JPEG+RAW

Viewfinder
- Viewfinder: 0.83x magnification, 95% frame coverage, Pentamirror, Spherical Acute Matte screen, 17.6mm eye relief, diopter adjustment

Image processing
- White balance: Auto, daylight, shade, cloudy, tungsten, fluorescent, flash, color temperature, custom
- WB bracketing: 3 frames

General
- LCD screen: 230k dots, 2.7-inch TFT LCD
- Battery: 7.2 V, 1600 mAh ~750 Shots
- Weight: 545 g (19.2 oz)
- Made in: Japan

Sony α 200 (DSLR-A200) is the third model of Sony α digital cameras. The model offers a slight upgrade from the Sony α 100 at a lower price. It first shipped in February 2008.

It was officially succeeded by the Sony α 230; the α 230 is much lighter, also several features have been removed and direct buttons to several options have been replaced with on-screen menus. Many Alpha enthusiasts believe that the true replacement for the α 200 is the α 450 as it is more similar in size and weight, features and target market.

== Major changes from the α 100 ==
Some of the major changes from the previous A100 model are:

- LCD monitor upgrade from 2.5-inch to 2.7-inch, but same effective pixels
- X-sync (With Super Steady Shot On) from 1/125s to 1/160s
- More Recording Formats (16:9 selectable)
- New vertical grip VG-B30AM
- Higher ISO Sensitivity from 1600 to 3200
- Improved: Noise Handling
- Improved: AF Algorithm
- Changed: Button Layout - Second Function wheel has been replaced
- Removed: 2s Mirror Lockup
- Removed: Depth of Field preview Button
- Removed: Included MemoryStick to CF adapter (was included with Alpha 100)
- Removed: Flash/Hot Shoe cover

Level	Sensor	2004	2005	2006	2007	2008	2009	2010	2011		2012	2013	2014	2015	2016	2017	2018	2019	2020
Professional	Full frame						α900					α99				α99 II			
Professional	Full frame							α850											
High-end	APS-C		DG-7D			α700				α77				α77 II					
Midrange	APS-C									α65					α68				
Upper-entry	APS-C								α55		α57								
Upper-entry	APS-C				α100			α550 ^{F}	α580				α58						
Upper-entry	APS-C		DG-5D					α500	α560										
Upper-entry	APS-C							α450											
Entry-level	APS-C								α33	α35	α37								
Entry-level	APS-C					α350 ^{F}		α380	α390										
Entry-level	APS-C					α300		α330											
Entry-level	APS-C					α200		α230	α290										
Early models	Minolta 7000 with SB-70/SB-70S (1986) · Minolta 9000 with SB-90/SB-90S (1986) (Still video SLRs); Minolta MS-C1100 (1992) · Minolta RD-175 (1995)																		
Level	Sensor																		
Level	Sensor	2004	2005	2006	2007	2008	2009	2010	2011		2012	2013	2014	2015	2016	2017	2018	2019	2020
