= Schagerbrug =

- Village
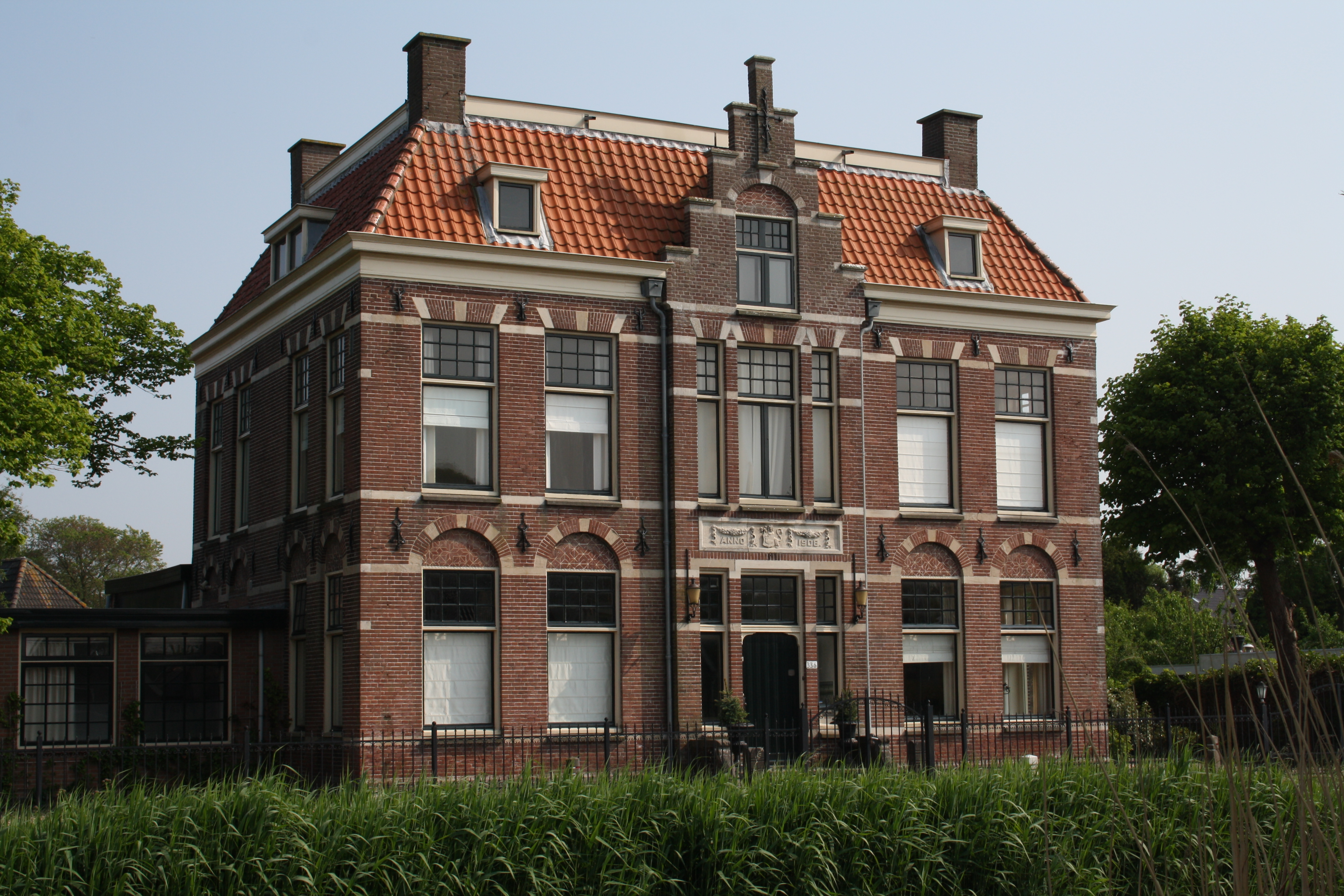
- Former town hall

- Location in the Netherlands Location in the province of North Holland in the Netherlands
- Coordinates: 52°48′N 4°46′E
- Country: Netherlands
- Province: North Holland
- Municipality: Schagen

Area
  - Village: 5.64 km^{2} (2.18 sq mi)
- Elevation: 0.2 m (0.66 ft)

Population (2025)
  - Village: 2,220
  - Density: 394/km^{2} (1,020/sq mi)
  - Urban: 1,670
  - Rural: 550
- Time zone: UTC+1 (CET)
  - Summer (DST): UTC+2 (CEST)
- Postal code: 1751
- Dialing code: 0224

Schagerbrug is a village in the Dutch province of North Holland. It is part of the municipality of Schagen, and was the main town of the former municipality of Zijpe. It lies about 2 km northwest of the town of Schagen.

== History ==
The village was first mentioned in 1613 as Schagerbrugge, and means "bridge (over the Groote Sloot on the road to) Schagen". The village developed shortly after the area was poldered in 1579. Schagerbrug is a cross shaped village with a linear settlement along the Groote Sloot and another linear settlement along the road. It would become the capital of the municipality of Zijpe.

The Dutch Reformed church is aisleless church with a slender gable tower. It was built between 1850 and 1851. The polder mill Ooster-N was probably built around 1740. In 1962, a pumping station was added. It was restored between 1971 and 1976, and is frequently in use on a voluntary basis.

Schagerbrug was home to 312 people in 1840. In 1973, the Zijper Museum opened in the former town hall, and provides an overview of the poldering of the 6,700 hectares (17,000 acres) area in 1597 which was a record-breaking attempt at the time. In 2013, it became part of the municipality of Schagen.

== Gallery ==
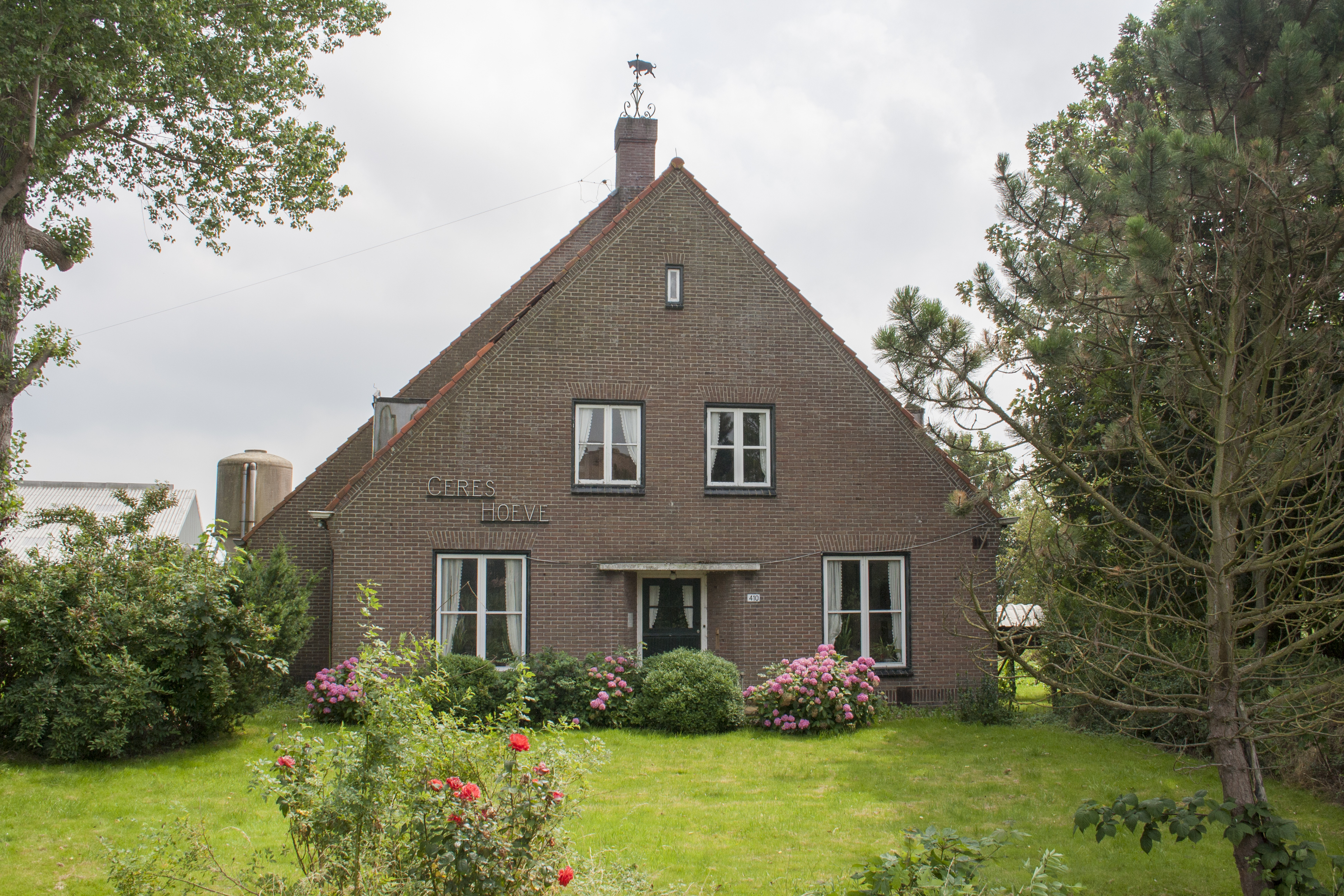
Farm in Schagerbrug

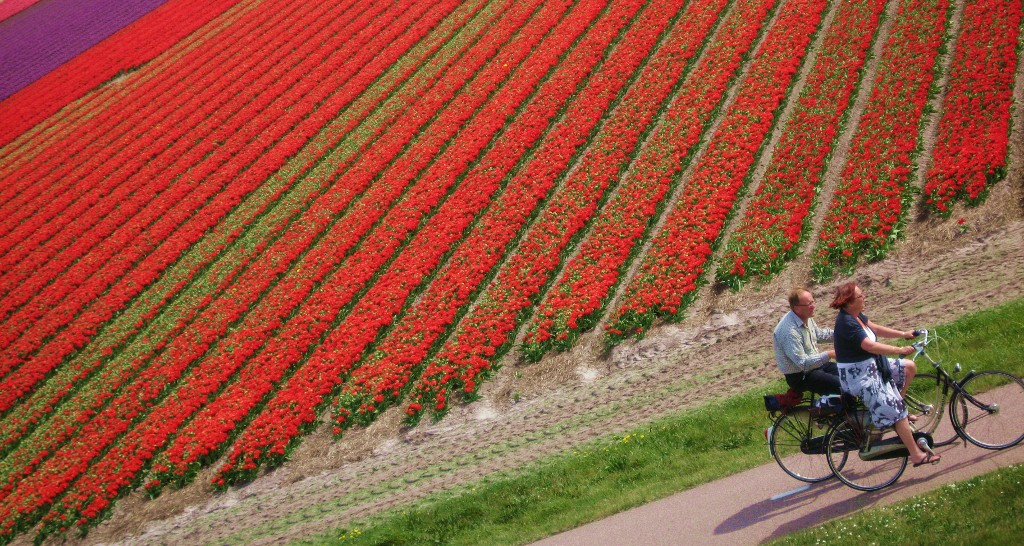
Flowers in Schagerbrug

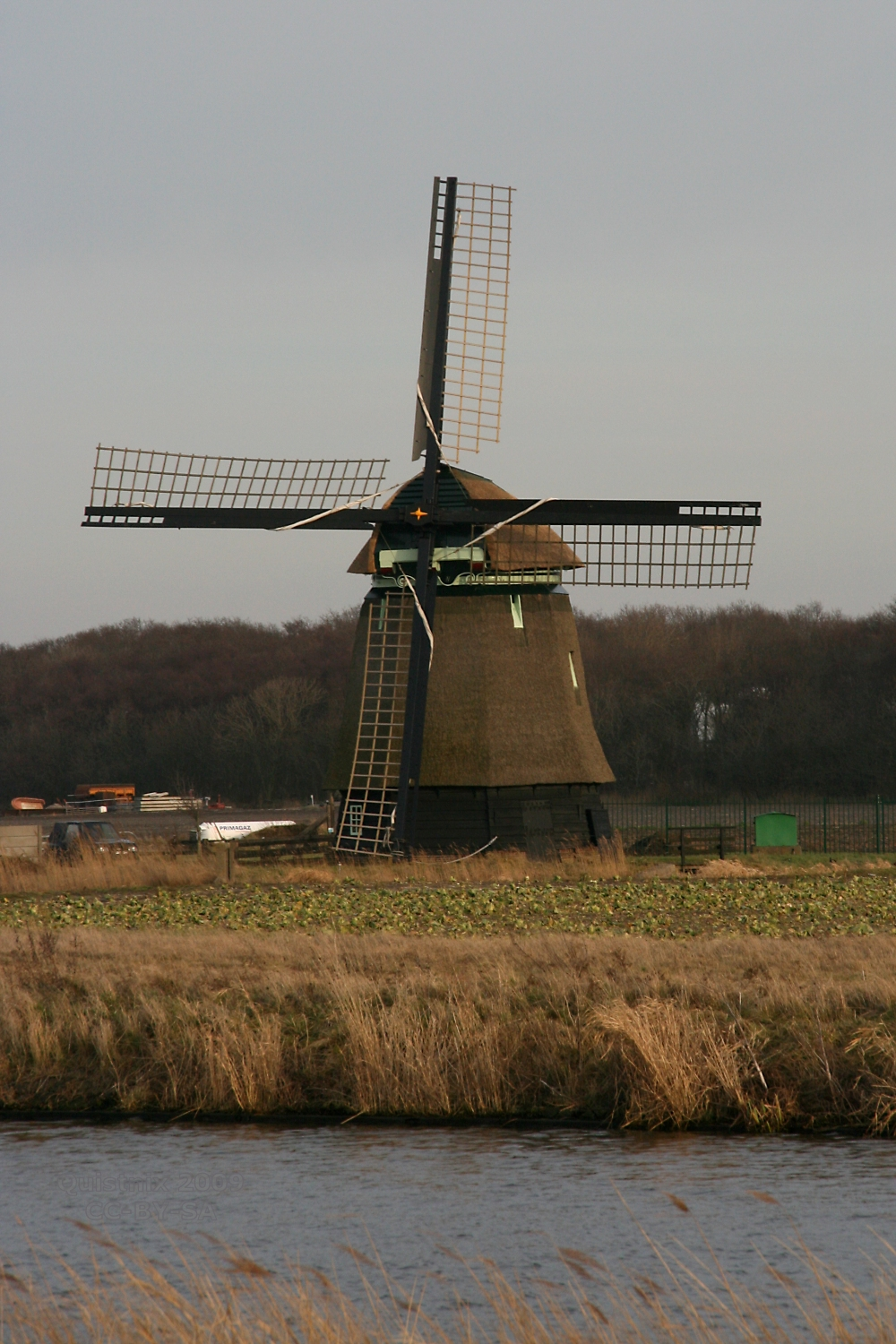
Windmill Ooster-N

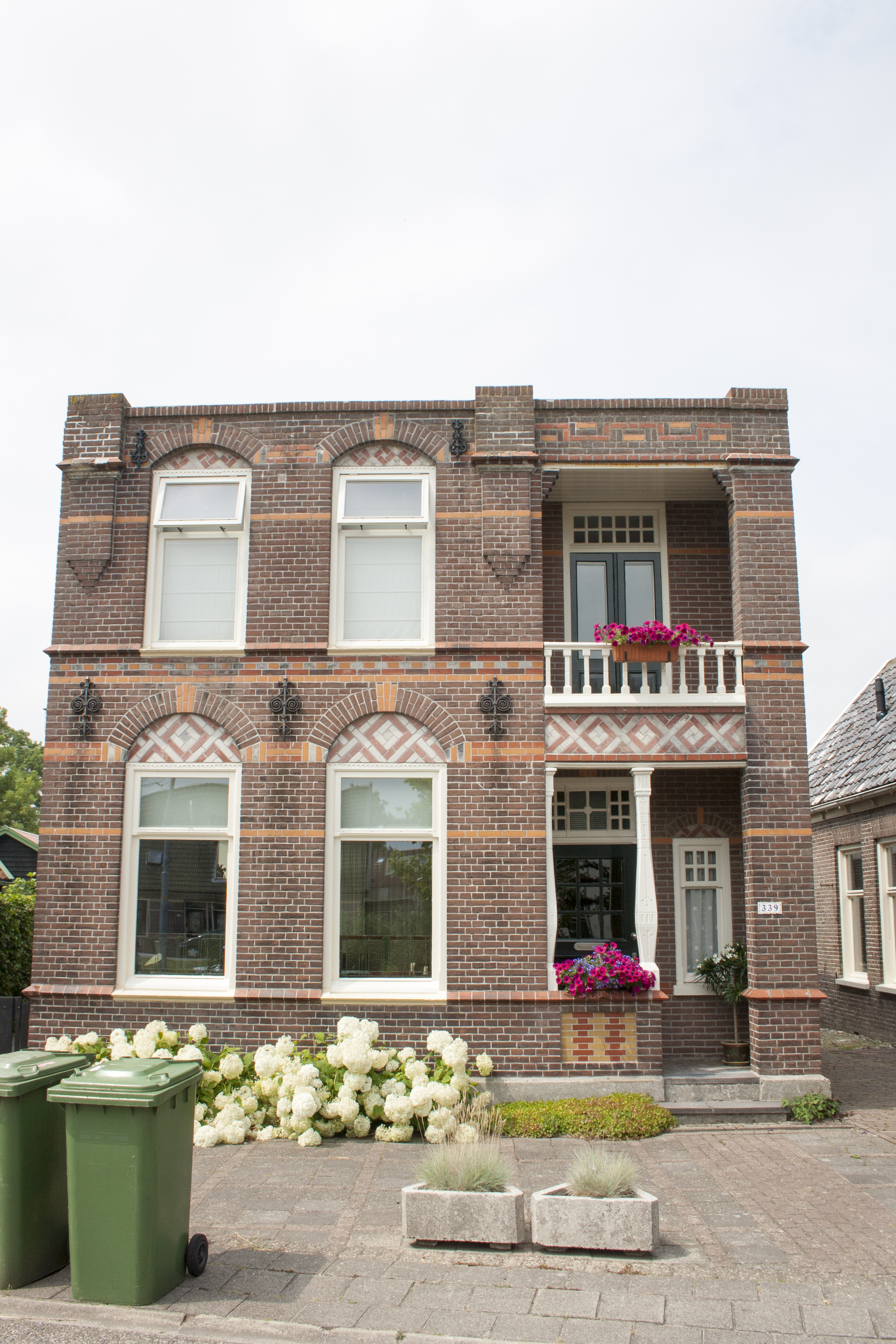
House in Schagerbrug
