= List of city routes in the Netherlands =

City routes in the Netherlands

Highway names

System links
- Roads in the Netherlands; Motorways; E-roads; Provincial; City routes

City routes in the Netherlands is a traffic management system to improve the flow of motor vehicles in and out of city centres. It uses three digit road numbers preceded by the letter S (for stad, the Dutch word for city).

The system was first developed in Amsterdam in 1977, as part of an urban planning effort in which traffic signs used numbers, similar to postal codes, for neighbourhoods. The system was considered incomprehensible. In 1985, traffic signs with neighbourhood numbers were abandoned but the numbering of city routes was preserved.

An inner ring road around the city center was defined as a hub and given the number S 100. The city routes are the spokes that connect this hub with the outer ring road, in the case of Amsterdam the A10 motorway. Each city route is in principle numbered according to the exit it connects with at the outer ring road. For example, the S110 connects inner ring road S100 with exit 10 of motorway A10.

Other cities followed the Amsterdam example. Seven cities make use of city routes in the Netherlands: Amsterdam, Almere, The Hague, Heerlen, Nijmegen, Rotterdam, and Zaanstad.

== City routes in Amsterdam ==
Number	Length (km)	Length (mi)	Southern or western terminus	Northern or eastern terminus	Formed	Removed	Notes
S 100	12	7.5	S 102	S 102	—	—	Amsterdam central ring road
S 101	4	2.5	S 102	S 152	—	—	
S 102	13	8.1	S 100	N202	—	—	
S 103	8	5.0	S 100	S 102	—	—	
S 104	3.3	2.1	S 103	S 103/N200	—	—	
S 105	4.6	2.9	S 100	S 104	—	—	
S 106	10.4	6.5	A9	S 100	—	—	
S 107	7.7	4.8	S 106	S 106	—	—	
S 108	—	—	A9	S 100	—	—	
S 109	—	—	A9	S 108	—	—	
S 110	—	—	A2	S 100	—	—	
S 111	—	—	S 112	A2/A9	—	—	
S 112	—	—	S 100	S 111	—	—	
S 113	—	—	A9	S 100	—	—	
S 114	—	—	S 100	A1	—	—	
S 115	—	—	A10	S 116	—	—	
S 116	—	—	S 100	A10	—	—	
S 117	—	—	S 115	A10	—	—	
S 118	—	—	S 116	A8/N516	—	—	
S 207	—	—	S 104	S 106	—	—	
S 211	—	—	S 113	A2/N522	—	—	
Former

== City routes in Almere ==
Number	Length (km)	Length (mi)	Southern or western terminus	Northern or eastern terminus	Formed	Removed	Notes
S 101	—	—	—	—	—	—	
S 102	—	—	—	—	—	—	
S 103	—	—	—	—	—	—	
S 104	—	—	—	—	—	—	
S 105	—	—	—	—	—	—	
S 106	—	—	—	—	—	—	

== City routes in The Hague ==
Number	Length (km)	Length (mi)	Southern or western terminus	Northern or eastern terminus	Formed	Removed	Notes
S 100	11	6.8	S 101/A12	S 101/A12	—	—	The Hague center ring
S 101	3.6	2.2	S100	N14 (The Hague Ring)	—	—	Much of route was N44 before November 2010
S 102	0.5	0.31	S100	S200 (The Hague Ring)	—	—	
S 103	0.4	0.25	S100	S200 (The Hague Ring)	—	—	
S 104	6.2	3.9	S100	N211 (The Hague Ring)	—	—	
S 105	5.3	3.3	S100	N211 (The Hague Ring)	—	—	
S 106	3	1.9	S104	A4 (The Hague Ring)	—	—	Only city route that does not connect to the S100
S 107	3.8	2.4	S100	A4 (The Hague Ring)	—	—	Originally ran along the Rijswijkseweg and the Haagweg until 2021; now runs along the Rotterdamsebaan
S 108	1.9	1.2	S100	A12	—	—	
S 200	14	8.7	N211/S 105	N44	—	—	Portion of The Hague Ring

== City routes in Nijmegen ==
Number	Length (km)	Length (mi)	Southern or western terminus	Northern or eastern terminus	Formed	Removed	Notes
S 100	15	9.3	N325 at Keizer Traianusplein	N842	—	—	
S 101	2.5	1.6	S 103/S 105 at Keizer Karelplein	S 100	—	—	
S 102	2	1.2	Quackplein	S 100 at Industrieplein	—	—	
S 103	2.8	1.7	Keizer Karelplein	S 100/N326	—	—	Formerly signed as N326
S 104	2.7	1.7	S 100	St. Annastraat (S 105)	—	—	
S 105	3.7	2.3	S 100/N844	S 101/S 103 at Keizer Karelplein	—	—	
S 106	3.7	2.3	S 100/N842	St. Annastraat (S 105)	—	—	
S 110	1.6	0.99	S 100 at Splitsingspunt Lent	N325	—	—	
S 111	2.5	1.6	S 100 at Graaf Alardlaan	N325	—	—	

== City routes in Rotterdam ==
Number	Length (km)	Length (mi)	Southern or western terminus	Northern or eastern terminus	Formed	Removed	Notes
S 100	—	—	—	—	—	—	
S 101	—	—	—	—	—	—	
S 102	—	—	—	—	—	—	
S 103	—	—	—	—	—	—	
S 104	—	—	—	—	—	—	
S 105	—	—	—	—	—	—	
S 106	—	—	—	—	—	—	
S 107	—	—	—	—	—	—	
S 108	—	—	—	—	—	—	
S 109	—	—	—	—	—	—	
S 110	—	—	—	—	—	—	
S 111	—	—	—	—	—	—	
S 112	—	—	—	—	—	—	
S 113	—	—	—	—	—	—	
S 114	—	—	—	—	—	—	
S 115	—	—	—	—	—	—	
S 118	—	—	—	—	—	—	
S 120	—	—	—	—	—	—	
S 121	—	—	—	—	—	—	
S 122	—	—	—	—	—	—	
S 123	—	—	—	—	—	—	
S 124	—	—	—	—	—	—	
S 125	—	—	—	—	—	—	
S 126	—	—	—	—	—	—	
S 127	—	—	—	—	—	—	

== City routes in Zaanstad ==
Number	Length (km)	Length (mi)	Southern or western terminus	Northern or eastern terminus	Formed	Removed	Notes
S 150	10.7	6.6	S118 in Amsterdam	Roundabout at the N246 in Buitenhuizen	—	—	
S 151	2.2	1.4	A8/A7, Zaandam junction	S152	—	—	
S 152	9.8	6.1	N203 and N246 in Wormerveer	Hempont ferry	—	—	Formerly a portion of the N203
S 153	7.1	4.4	N246	A7	—	—	Concurrent with the N515
S 154	2	1.2	A8/N8/N246	Roundabout in Assendelft	—	—	
S 155	7.5	4.7	S150/N516	A7	—	—	Concurrent with the S153
