= 't Zand, Schagen =

't Zand
- Village
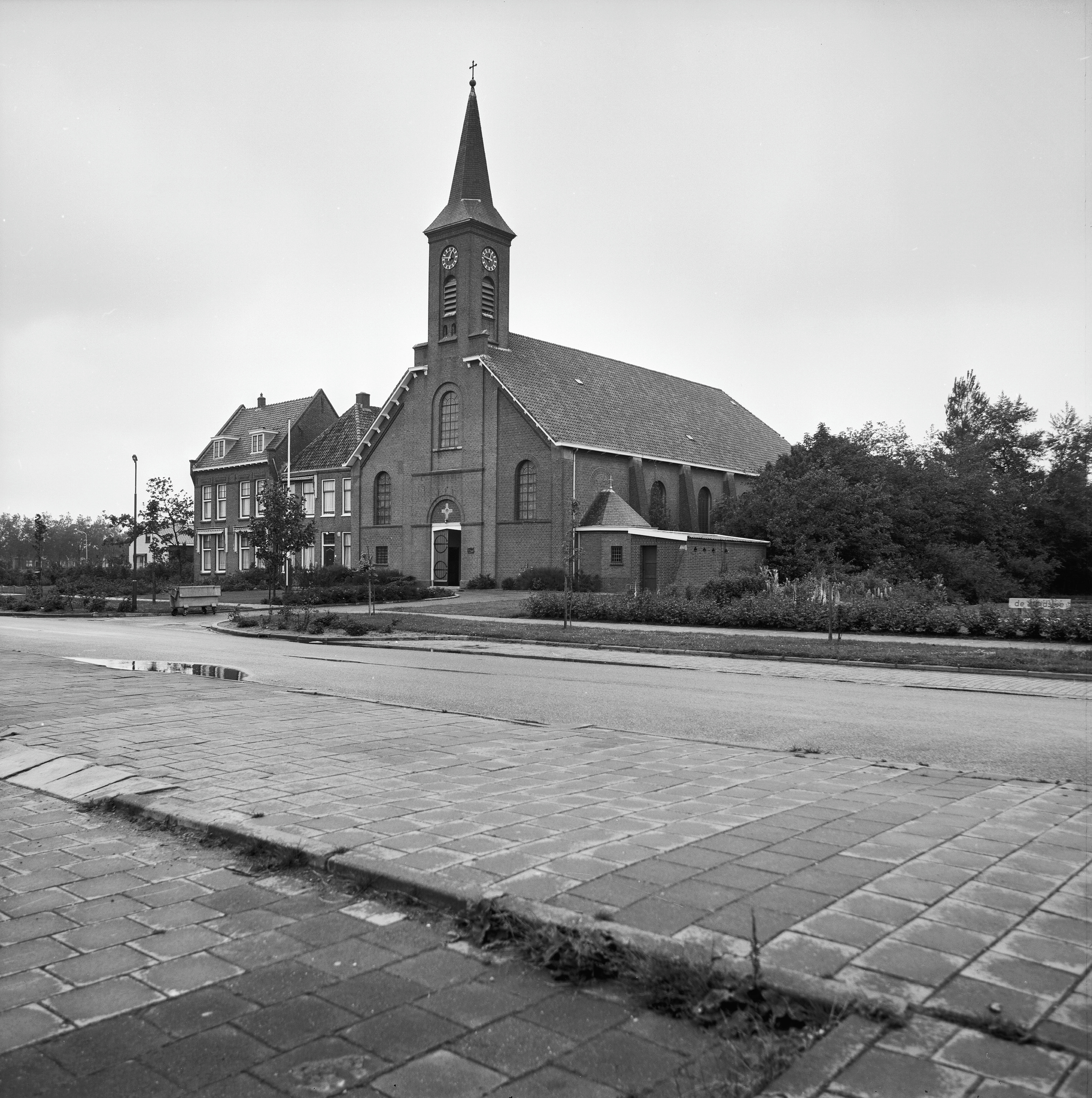
- Church in 't Zand

- Location in the Netherlands Location in the province of North Holland in the Netherlands
- Coordinates: 52°50′14″N 4°45′17″E
- Country: Netherlands
- Province: North Holland
- Municipality: Schagen

Area
  - Village: 14.66 km^{2} (5.66 sq mi)
- Elevation: 0.7 m (2.3 ft)

Population (2025)
  - Village: 2,755
  - Density: 187.9/km^{2} (486.7/sq mi)
  - Urban: 2,345
  - Rural: 410
- Time zone: UTC+1 (CET)
  - Summer (DST): UTC+2 (CEST)
- Postal code: 1756
- Dialing code: 0224

't Zand is a village in the Dutch province of North Holland. It is a part of the municipality of Schagen and lies about 12 kilometres (7.5 mi) south of Den Helder.

== History ==
The village was first mentioned in 1770 as "eene herberg, het zand genoemt", and is named after an inn which was colloquially called Zand (sand), but whose official name was 't Wapen van Alkmaar. 't Zand developed in the northern part of the Zijpe- and Hazepolder which were poldered between 1596 and 1597. The construction of the Noordhollandsch Kanaal between 1821 and 1824, resulted in a modest growth.

't Zand developed as a Catholic settlement, because clandestine churches were tolerated in the area. The Catholic O.L. Vrouwe Visitatie Church was built in 1863 and is a modest design. The church was deemed unstable in 1920, and large buttresses have been built to strengthen the construction.

== Education ==
In 't Zand there are two primary schools; there are no secondary schools. Zandhope is a small village school with four classrooms catering for ages 4 to 12. St. Jozef (a Catholic school) has about 20 classrooms and caters for ages 4 to 14 years.

== Transportation ==
't Zand is the site of one of the five operational vlotbruggen. The current was constructed in 1949 on the Noordhollandsche Kanaal.

== Notable people ==
- Emiel Hopman (1963–2023) speed skater
