= Sint Maartensbrug =

- Village
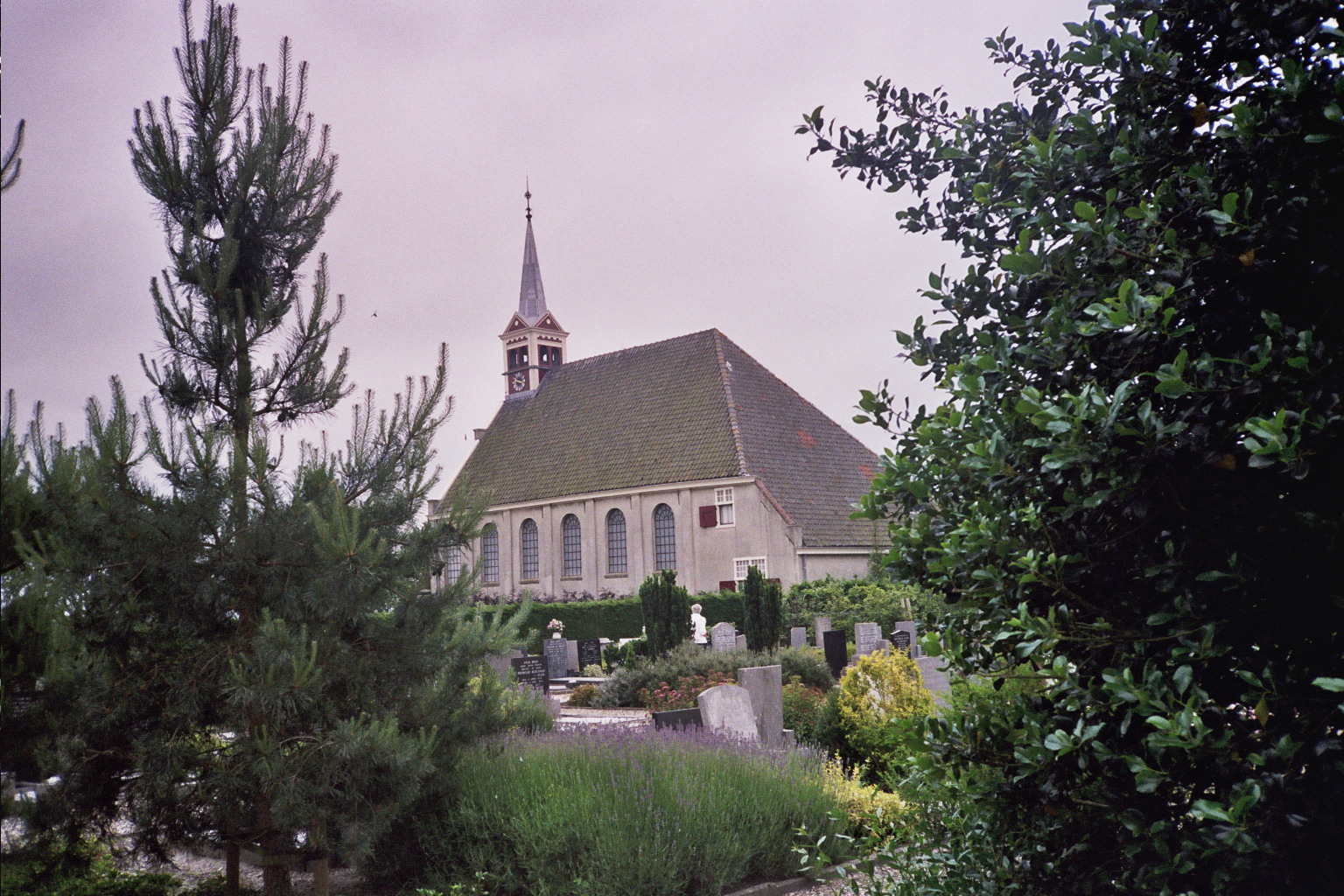
- Dutch Reformed church

- Location in the Netherlands Location in the province of North Holland in the Netherlands
- Coordinates: 52°47′N 4°44′E
- Country: Netherlands
- Province: North Holland
- Municipality: Schagen

Area
  - Village: 7.98 km^{2} (3.08 sq mi)
- Elevation: 0.0 m (0 ft)

Population (2025)
  - Village: 725
  - Density: 90.9/km^{2} (235/sq mi)
  - Urban: 425
  - Rural: 305
- Time zone: UTC+1 (CET)
  - Summer (DST): UTC+2 (CEST)
- Postal code: 1752
- Dialing code: 0224

Sint Maartensbrug is a village in the Dutch province of North Holland. It is a part of the municipality of Schagen, and lies about 14 km northwest of Heerhugowaard.

== History ==
The village was first mentioned in 1613 as "Sinte Maertensbrugge", and means "bridge (over the Groote Sloot on the road to) Sint Maarten". Sint Maartensbrug is a cross shaped village which appeared shortly after the area was poldered between 1596 and 1597. It consists of a linear settlement along the Groote Sloot and another linear settlement along the road.

The Dutch Reformed church is a wide aisleless church with wooden tower which was built in 1696. The polder mill N-G or Noorder G was probably built in the second half of the 17th century. It was in service until 1958 when it was replaced by a Diesel powered pumping station. Between 1969 and 1972, the windmill was restored and is frequently in service on a voluntary basis.

== Gallery ==
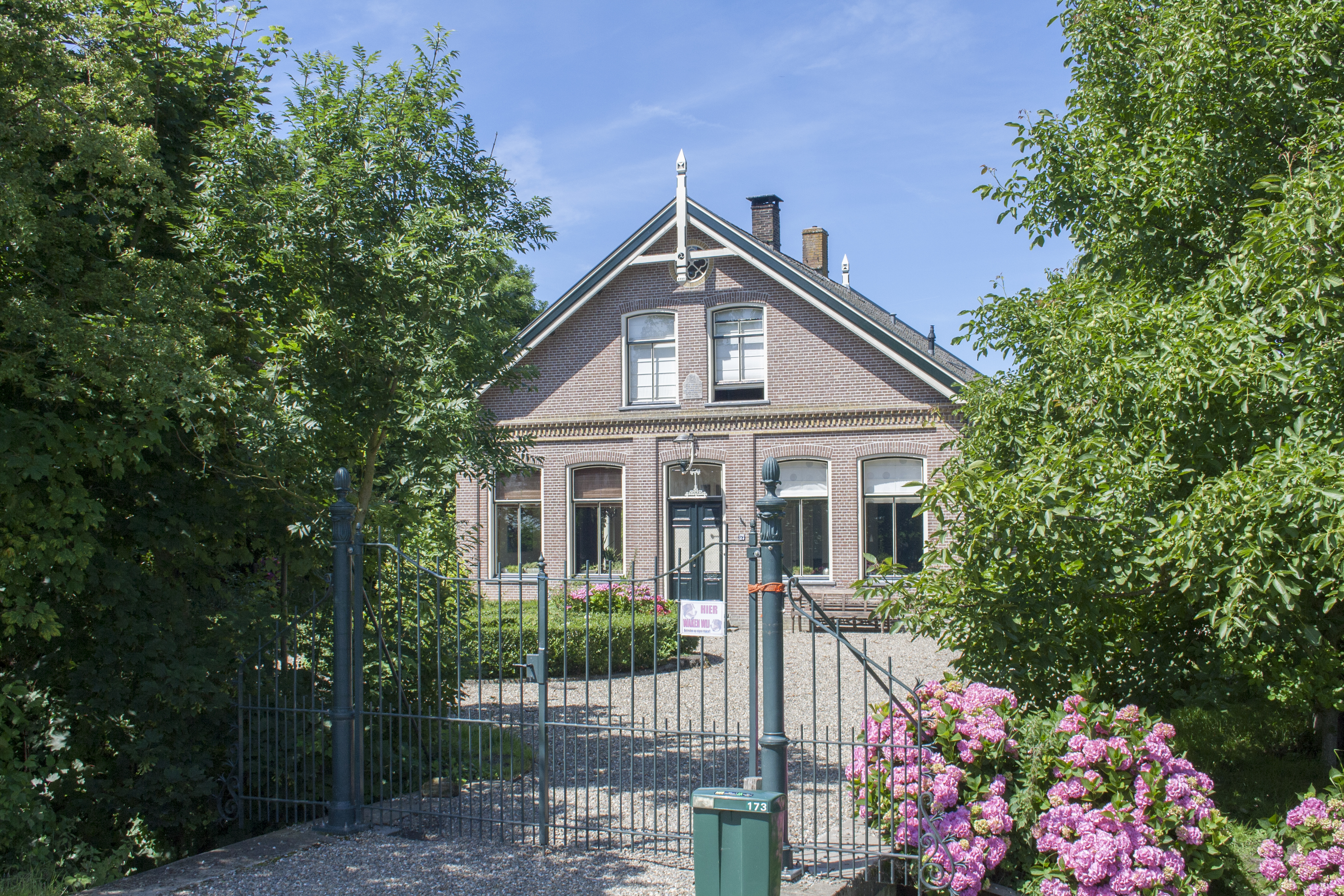
Farm in Sint Maartensbrug

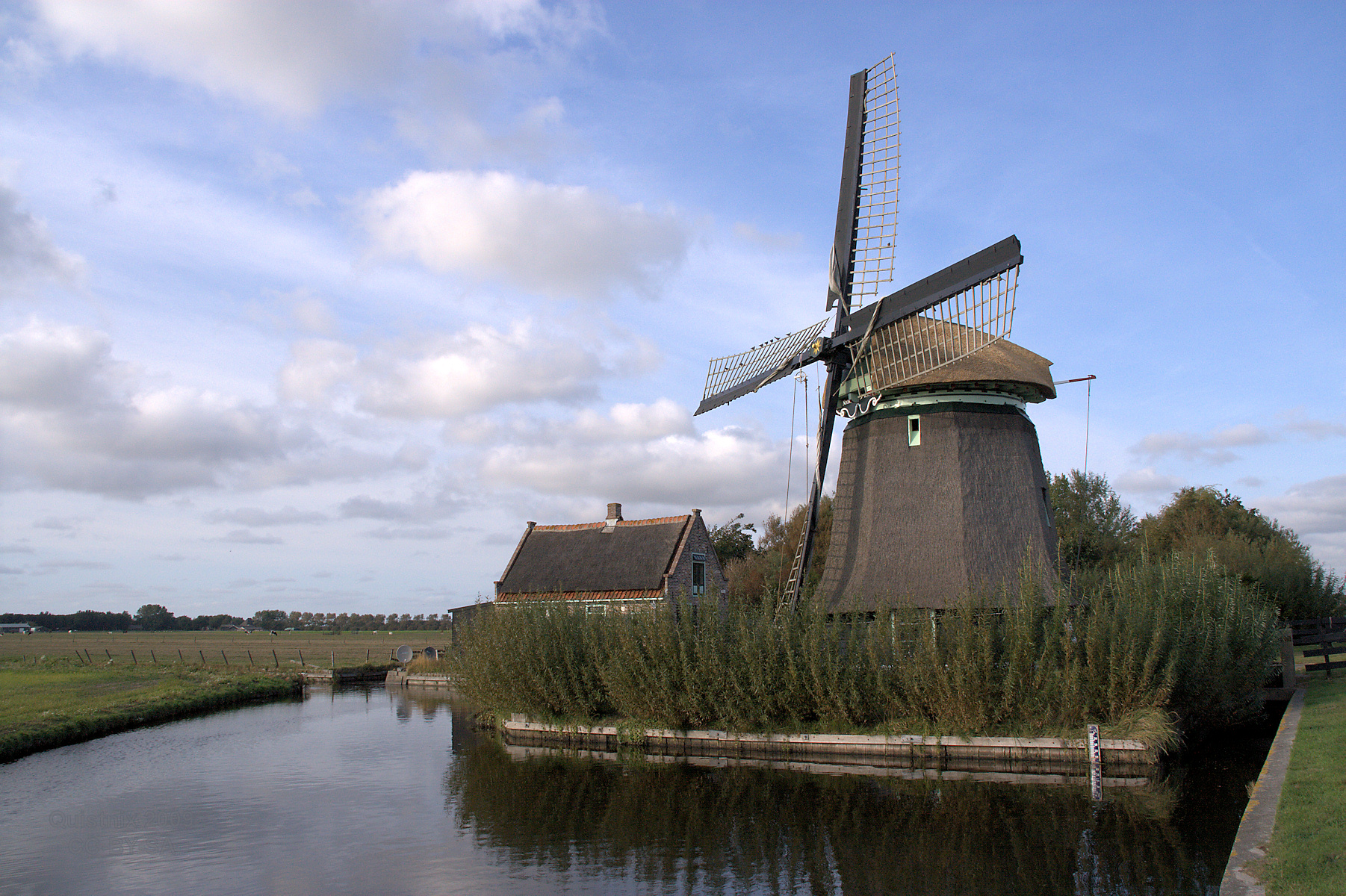
Windmill Noorder-G

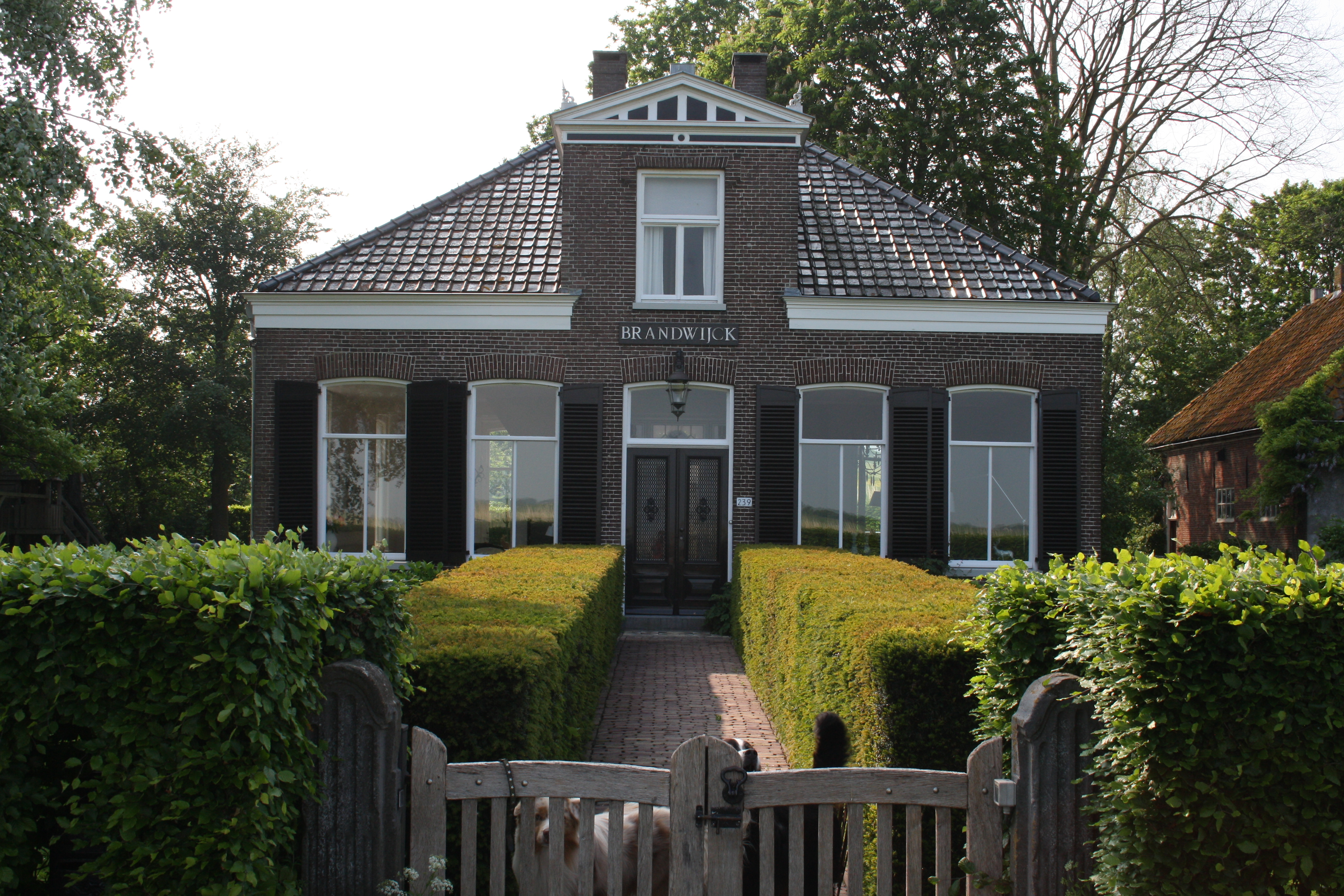
Farm in Sint Maartensbrug

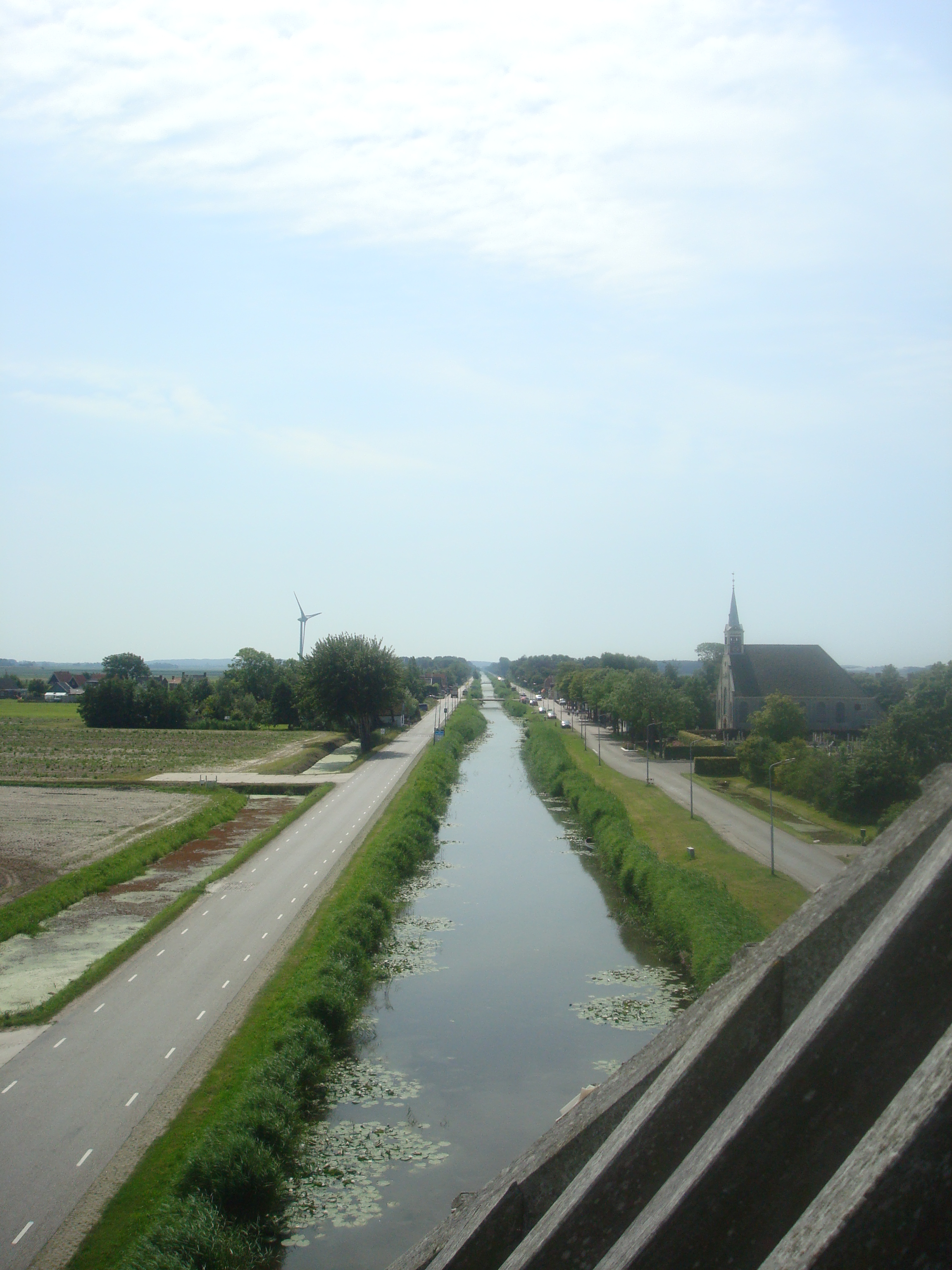
View on Sint Maartenbrug along the Groote Sloot

== See also ==
- Sint Maartensvlotbrug
