= Burgerbrug =

- Village
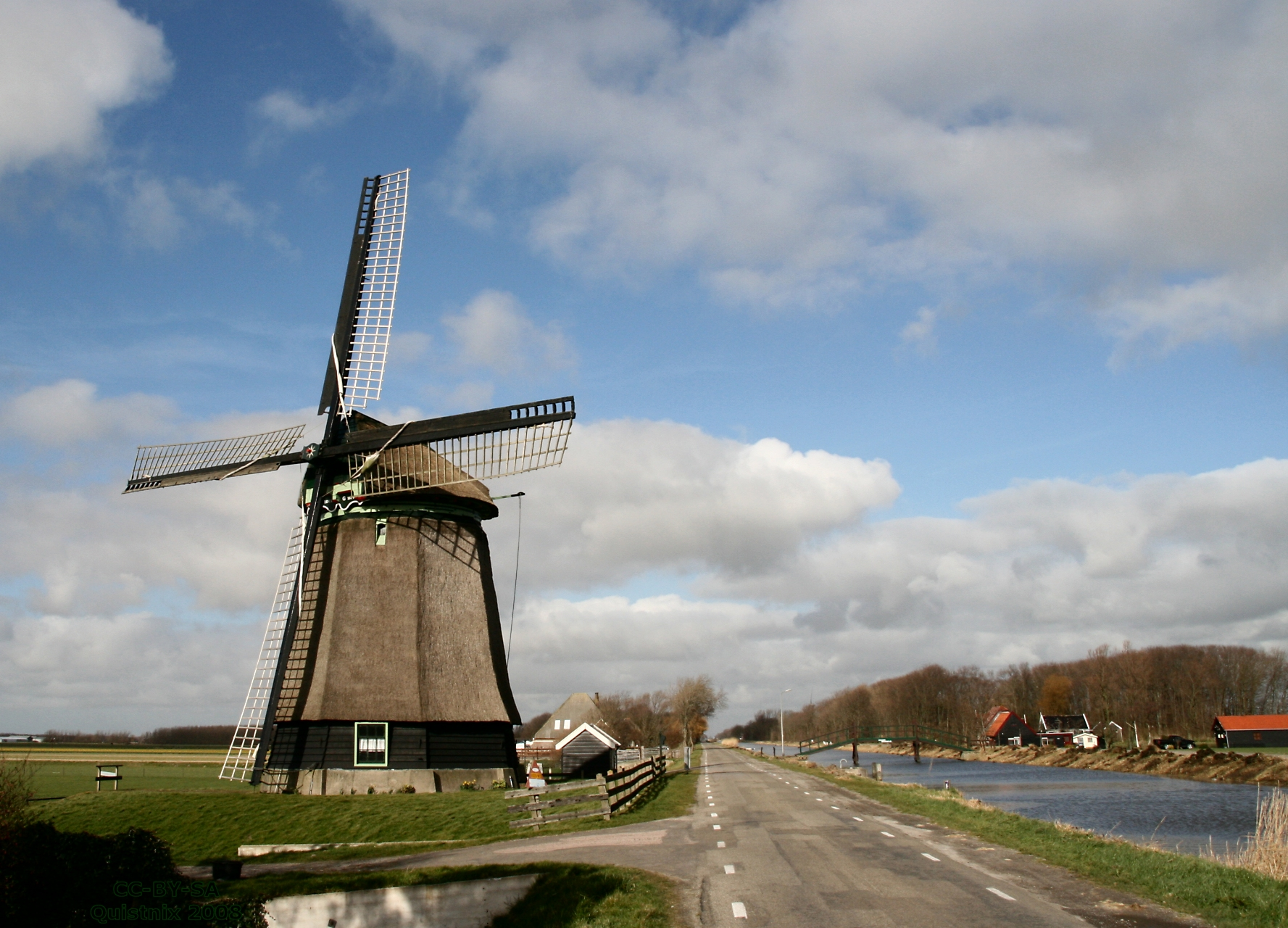

- Location in the Netherlands Location in the province of North Holland in the Netherlands
- Coordinates: 52°44′52″N 4°42′07″E
- Country: Netherlands
- Province: North Holland
- Municipality: Schagen

Area
  - Village: 13.03 km^{2} (5.03 sq mi)
- Elevation: 1.0 m (3.3 ft)

Population (2025)
  - Village: 710
  - Density: 54/km^{2} (140/sq mi)
  - Urban: 410
  - Rural: 300
- Time zone: UTC+1 (CET)
  - Summer (DST): UTC+2 (CEST)
- Postal code: 1754
- Dialing code: 0226

Burgerbrug is a village in the Dutch province of North Holland. It is a part of the municipality of Schagen, and lies about 14 km north of Alkmaar.

Burgerbrug (originally Eenigenburgerbrug) was settled shortly after the surrounding area was drained in 1597. The village took its name from a bridge over the Groote Slot, located on the road to Eenigenburg. It is a cross-shaped settlement with one part following the Groote Sloot and another part following the road.

The Catholic Onze-Lieve-Vrouw-Geboortekerk is an aisleless church built in 1866 to replace a clandestine church. Burgerbrug was home to 185 people in 1840. Three polder mills are still present in Burgerbrug. Two of the windmills probably date from 1597.

== Gallery ==
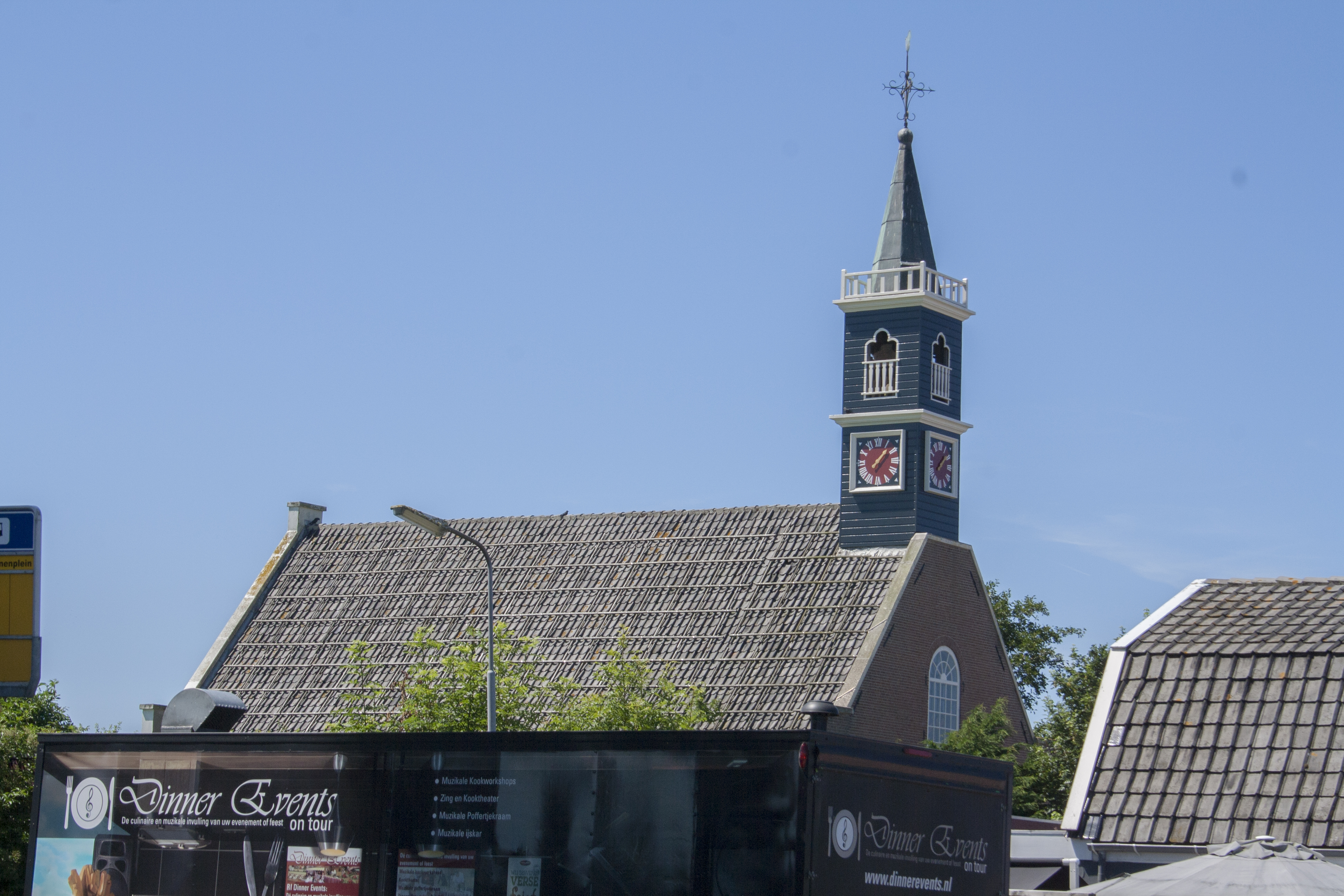
Dutch Reformed church

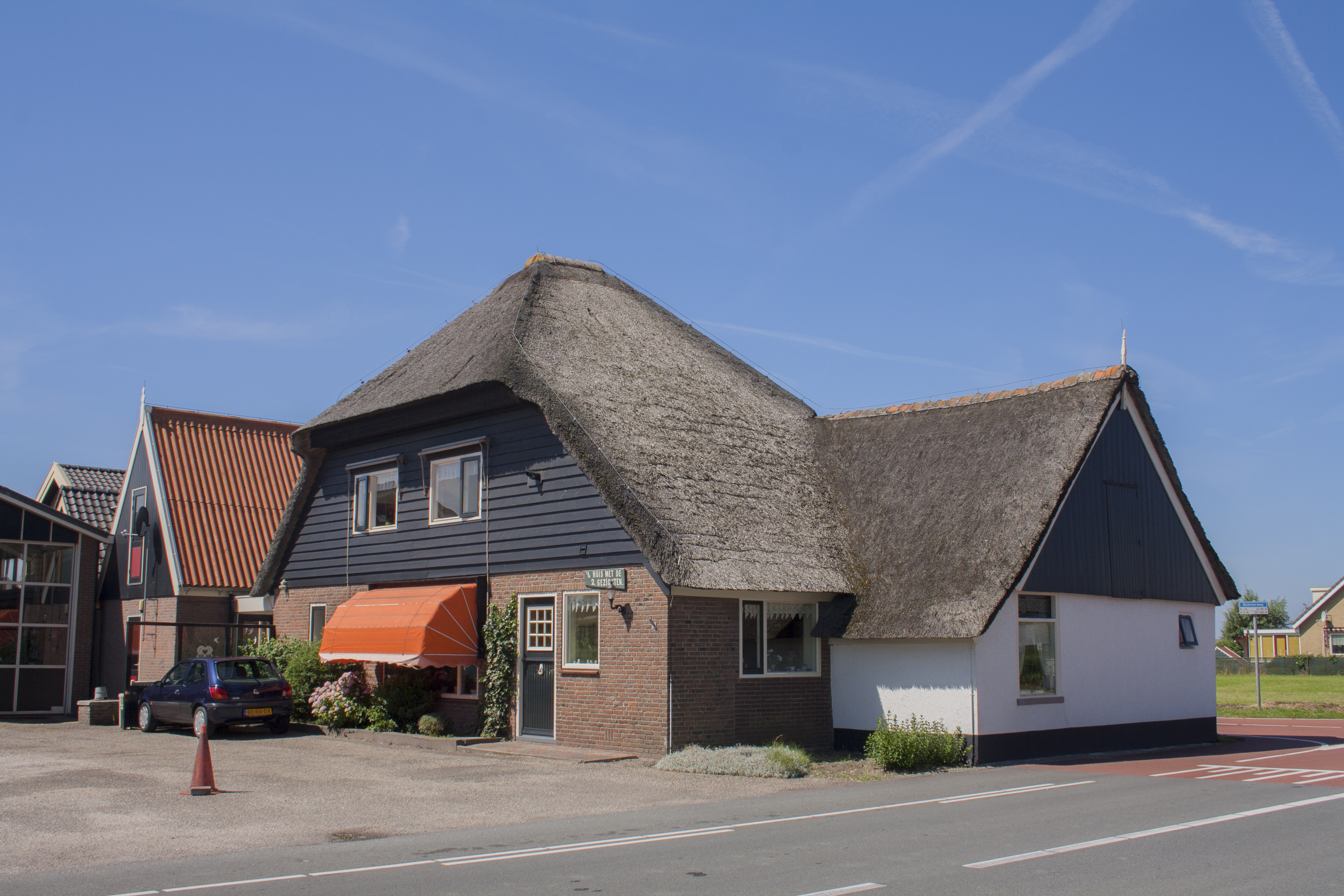
House in Burgerbrug

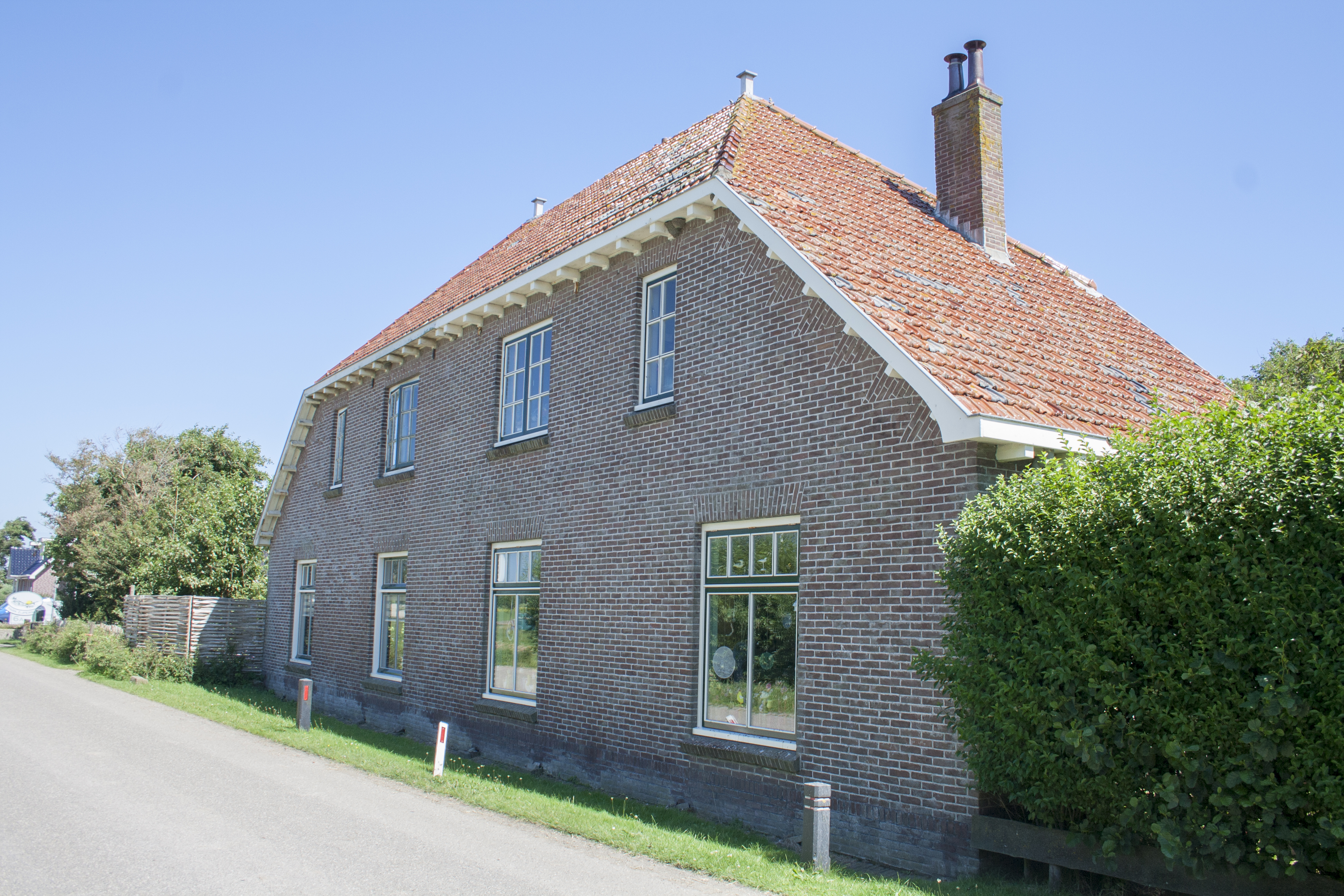
House in Burgerbrug
