= Stedelijk Museum Kampen =

Coordinates: 52.5588°N 5.9167°E

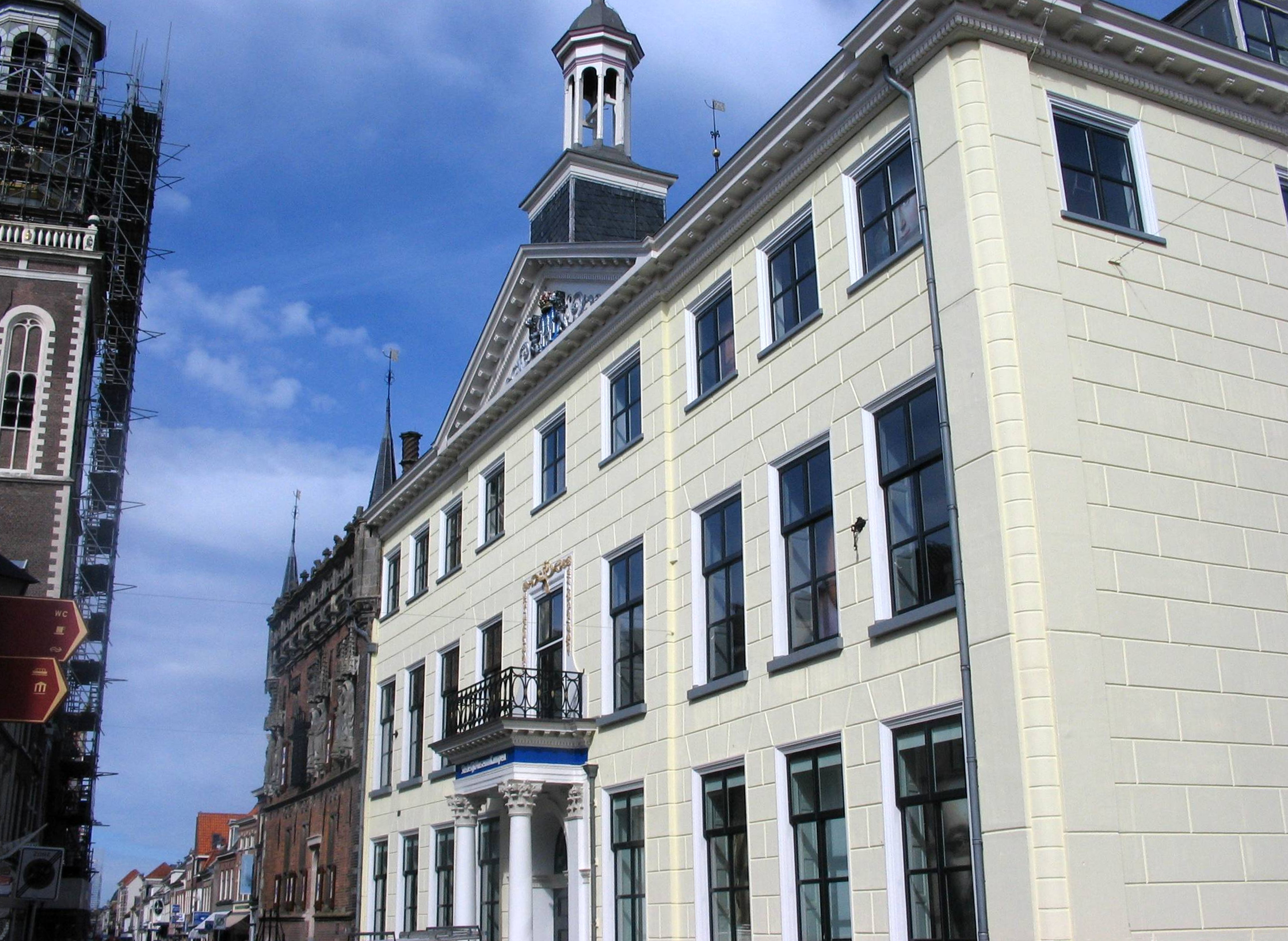
City Hall, Kampen

The Stedelijk Museum Kampen (lit. Municipal Museum Kampen) is a museum situated in the Old Town Hall of Kampen. The collection has four main topics: water, religion, justice and the House of Orange-Nassau. There are also five to six temporary exhibitions on contemporary art a year.

== History of the Old Town Hall ==
=== Exterior ===
The original Old Town Hall dates from around 1350. Here, from the Middle Ages until the French occupation justice was spoken by magistrates and councils. The building was built in the Lower Rhine Gothic-style so characteristic of the German Hanseatic towns: a rectangular shape, simple decorations and windows in arch niches.

The building stood free with an entrance on the south side. This entrance is now closed by the construction of the New Town Hall next to it. On the south side was also the landing from which the city government announced decisions and where criminals were presented to the people.

=== Fire ===
During the night of February 4 to 5, 1543 the Old Town Hall burned out. Only the outer walls, vaults and a portion of the floor remained intact, but badly battered. Very soon the rebuilding began and one year later the exterior was finished. From that moment on the Old Town Hall has two different architectural styles: the aspiring lines of the late Gothic mingle with the horizontal lines that are typical of the Renaissance. The decorations are made in stone. The images on the west facade were created by the Amsterdam sculptor J. Polet jr. and date from the 1930s. They replace the badly damaged medieval images that are currently in the Koornmarkt gate on display. From left to right, they suggest: Charlemagne, Alexander the Great, Temperance, Faith, Justice and Charitas.

== Collection ==
The permanent collection of the Stedelijk Museum Kampen has four main topics: water, religion, justice and the House of Orange. There are also five to six temporary exhibitions on contemporary art a year.

=== Water ===
Kampen became rich through the water. The water made trade possible to faraway places, where a lot of money was earned. But water also provided a threat. In the rooms with the topic 'Water', the history of Kampen and the water is shown. The old Hanseatic League, the rise and fall of the Hanseatic city, the sea level rise in our times; Kampen living with water.

=== Religion ===
Religion has always been very present in Kampen. Until the Reformation Kampen was a Roman Catholic town. There were large churches and monasteries in the old town. After the Reformation Kampen became Protestant and two theological universities were founded. Much has been preserved from this period. This can be seen in the rooms with the theme 'Religion'.

=== Justice ===
Early in the Middle Ages Kampen obtains city rights. From the Schepenzaal (The Alderman Hall) the city was governed and justice was spoken. This old hall of 1545 is the showpiece of the museum. The hall has been unchanged for over hundreds of years and can be visited. The museum rooms on 'Governance' and 'Justice' show how Government and Justice worked in those early days.

=== House of Orange-Nassau ===
The Stedelijk Museum Kampen has painted portraits of all the rulers and kings from the House of Orange-Nassau. The members of the House of Orange-Nassau are all painted in full length, from head to toe.

== The use of Multimedia ==
With a handheld computer and headphones you can make a journey through time and visit the collection. Voices and images of Kampen tell the story of the city. The tour is currently available for adults in Dutch. The Stedelijk museum also provides a tour which takes you outside past historical places and events in the city during one and a half hour. The display shows historic photographs and video of the place where you are situated at that moment. A comprehensive explanation is given by well known inhabitants.

Modern technology and history make it possible to show the city in the museum and the museum in the city. By using the multimedia tour visitors can not only enjoy inside, but also outside the city's colorful history. As one of the first museums in the Netherlands the Stedelijk Museum Kampen uses this kind of multimedia tour.
