= Avercamp =

Avercamp is a surname. Notable people with the surname include:

- Hendrick Avercamp (1585–1634), Dutch painter
- Barent Avercamp (1612–1679), Dutch painter
