= Albert Pighius =

Dutch Roman Catholic theologian, mathematician and astronomer

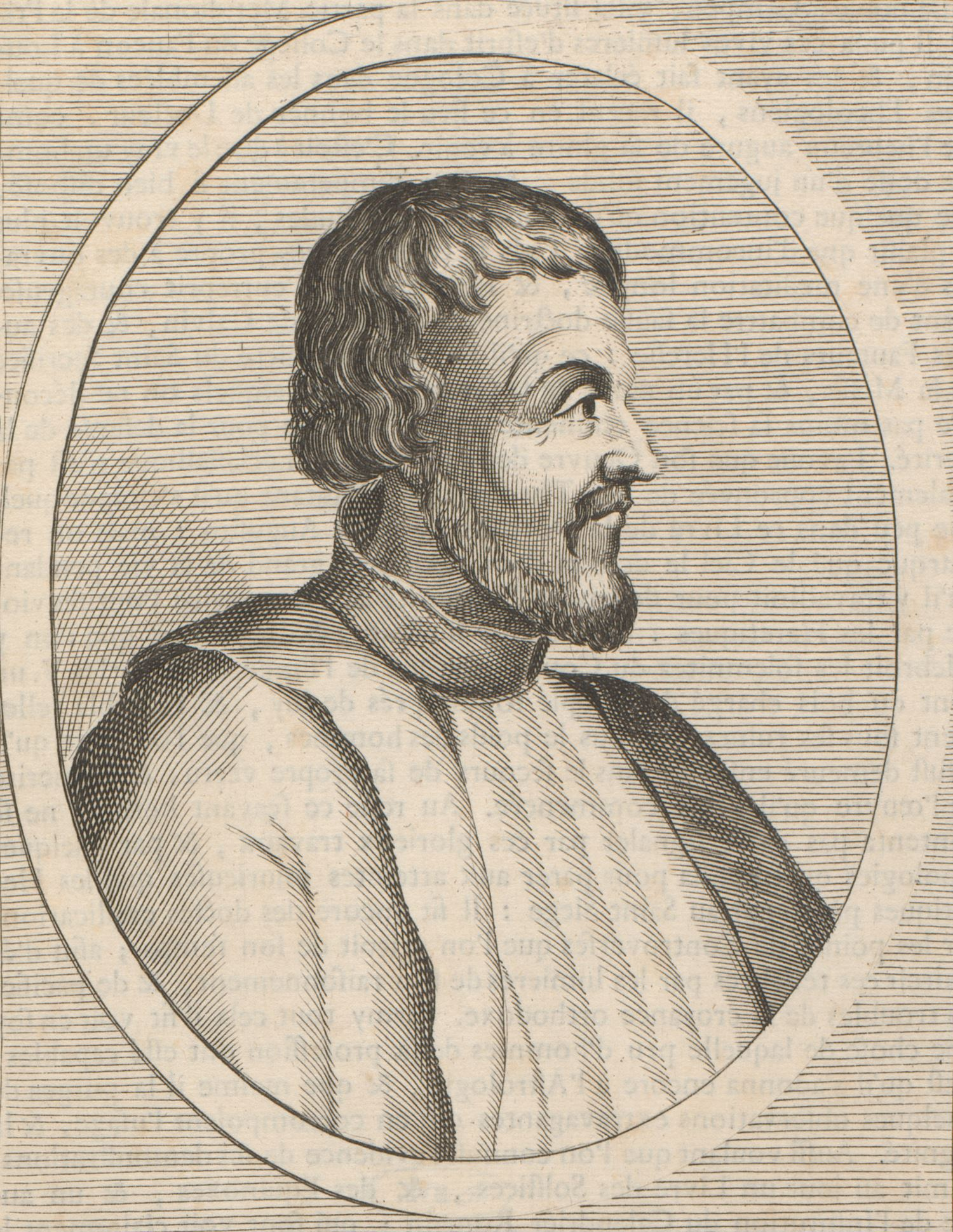
Albert Pighius

Albert Pighius (Pigghe) (born at Kampen, Overyssel, Netherlands, about 1490; died at Utrecht, 26 December 1542) was a Dutch Roman Catholic theologian, mathematician, and astronomer.

== Life ==
He studied philosophy and began the study of theology at the Catholic University of Leuven, where Adrian of Utrecht, later Pope Adrian VI, was one of his teachers. Pighius completed his studies at Cologne, but it is not clear whether he received the degree of Doctor of Theology. When his teacher Adrian became pope, he went to Rome, where he also remained during the reigns of Pope Clement VII and Pope Paul III, and was repeatedly employed in ecclesiastical-political embassies. He had taught mathematics to Cardinal Alessandro Farnese, afterward Paul III. In 1535 Paul III appointed him provost of St. John's at Utrecht, where he had held a canonry since 1524. At the conference of Ratisbon in 1541, he was on the Catholic side.

== Works ==
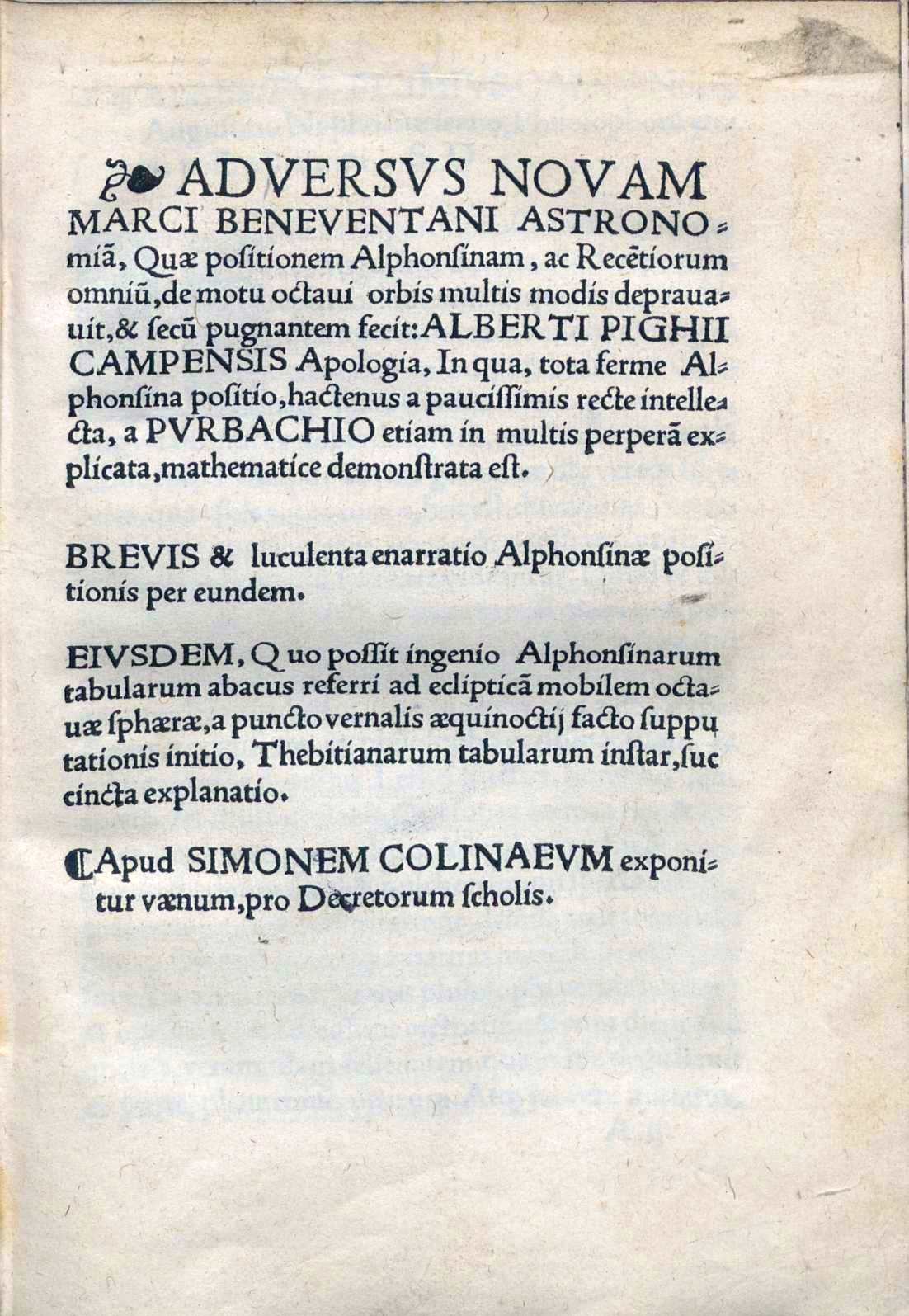
Adversus novam Marci Beneventani astronomiam, 1522

Among his writings the following belong to the sphere of his mathematical/astronomical studies:

- "Astrologiæ defensio adversus prognosticatorum vulgus, qui annuas prædictiones edunt et se astrologos mentiuntur" (Paris, 1518);
- the treatise addressed to Pope Leo X upon the reform of the calendar, "De æquinoctiarum solstitiorumque inventione et de ratione paschalis celebrationis deque restitutione ecclesiastici Calendarii (Paris, 1520);
- Adversus novam Marci Beneventani astronomiam (in Latin). Paris: Simon de Colines. 1522.
- "Apologia adversus novam Marci Beneventani astronomiam" (Paris, 1522);
- "Defensio Apologiæ adversus Marci Beneventani astronomiam" (Paris, 1522).

As a theologian he defended the authority of the Catholic Church against the Reformers. His most important theological work is a rejoinder to Henry VIII of England titled "Hierarchiæ ecclesiasticæ assertio" (Cologne, 1538, dedicated to Paul III; later editions, 1544, 1558, 1572). In reply John Leland wrote his "Antiphilarchia".

Pighius also wrote:

- "Apologia indicti a Paulo III. Concilii, adversus Lutheranas confederationes" (Cologne, 1537; Paris, 1538);
- "De libero hominis arbitrio et divina gratia libri X" (Cologne, 1542), against Martin Luther and John Calvin;
- "Controversiarum præcipuarum in Comitiis Ratisponensibus tractatarum ... explicatio (Cologne, 1542). To this were added the two treatises: "Quæstio de divortiatorum novis coniugiis et uxorum pluralitate sub lege evangelica" and "Diatriba de actis VI. et VII. Synodi".

Other theological works were:

- "Ratio componendorum dissidiorum et sarciendæ in religione concordiæ" (Cologne, 1542)
- "Apologia adversus Martini Buceri calumnias" (Mainz, 1543).

A treatise "Adversus Græcorum errores", dedicated to Clement VII, is preserved in manuscript in the Vatican Library.

== Theologian ==
Pighius held that original sin was the inherited sin of Adam but did not convey any inherent taint of sinfulness to the recipient.

He originated the doctrine of the double righteousness by which man is justified, that has been characterized as "semi-Lutheranism". According to this theory, the imputed righteousness of Christ is the formal cause of the justification of man before God, while the individual righteousness inherent in man is always imperfect and therefore insufficient. These opinions of Pighius were adopted by Johannes Gropper and Cardinal Contarini; during the discussion at the Council of Trent of the "Decretum de Justificatione" they were maintained by Girolamo Seripando, but the Council rejected the compromise theory.
