= Francina Broese Gunningh =

Dutch cross-dressing woman who served as a soldier

Francina Broese Gunningh, also known as Frans Gunningh Sloet (1783 - 1824), was a Dutch soldier who served in the French, Prussian and Dutch armies.

Gunningh Sloet was born 3 October 1783 in Kampen as the illegitimate daughter of Antje Broese, and worked as a domestic. During a trip back from Paris to the Netherlands, she dressed as a man, which was common for female travelers to avoid harassment during journeys. During the trip, however, she was arrested by the French military police as a suspected deserter after having failed to provide sufficient identifications papers, and was forcibly enlisted in the French army. She deserted, and instead enlisted in the Prussian army. When she was wounded in the chest, her sex was discovered, and she was forced to leave service.

She returned to the Netherlands, and enlisted in the Dutch army. She served in combat during the sieges of Kampen, Coevorden, and Deventer during the War of the Sixth Coalition.

In 1814, she was engaged to be married to Alida Landeel, and added the title "Lord of Amerongen" to her name. She was arrested for using a false noble title, but escaped prison. When she was arrested, she was forced to undergo a medical examination, which revealed her sex. She was sentenced to three years in prison for fraud. She died as the widow of one Mr. Lettener on 16 August 1824 in Edam, North Holland.
