= Kampen, Overijssel =

Kampen
- City and municipality
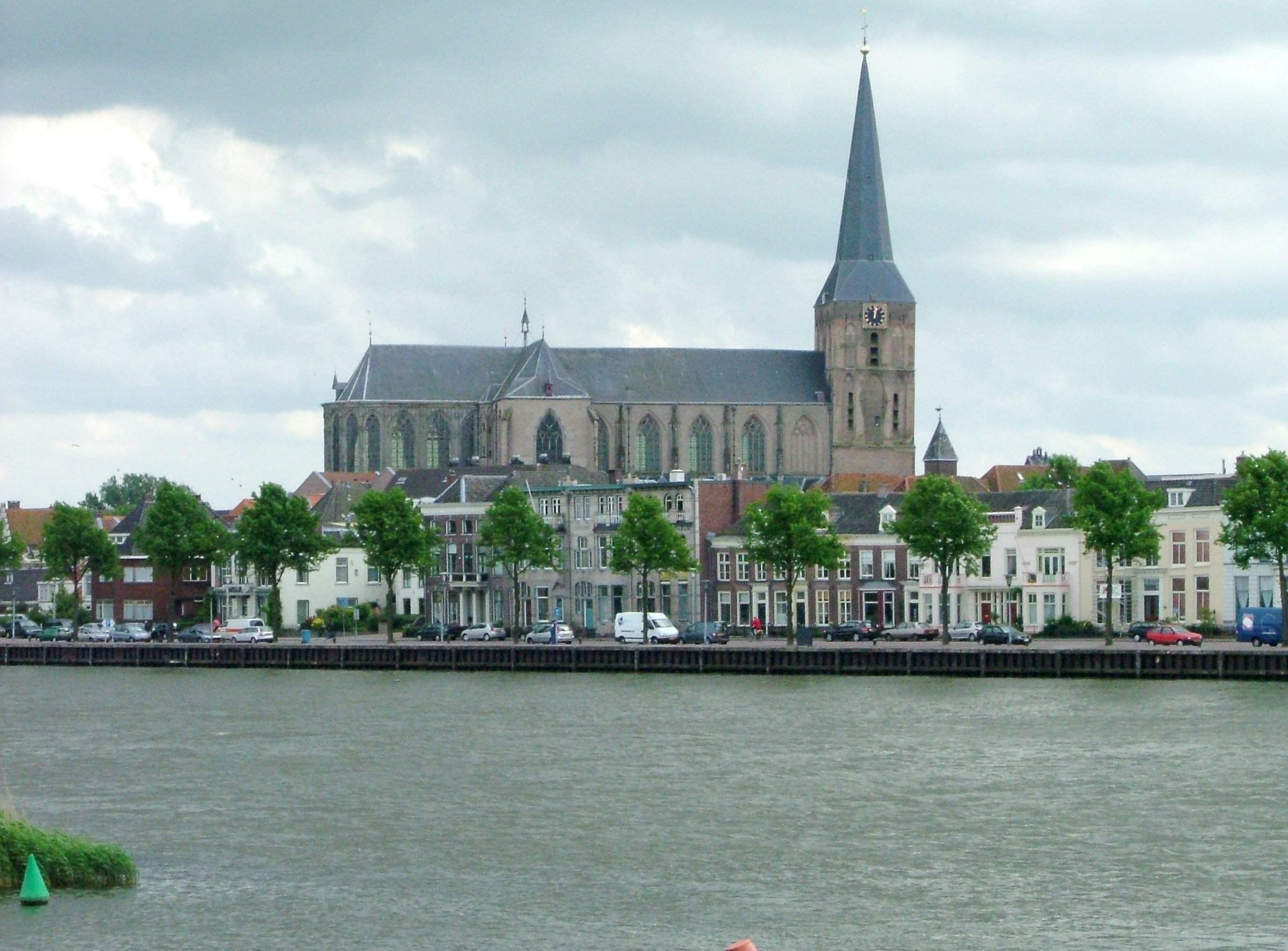
- Kampen city centre with the Bovenkerk in the middle of the picture

- Flag Coat of arms

- Location in Overijssel

- Location within the Netherlands Location within Europe
- Coordinates: 52°33′N 5°55′E
- Country: Netherlands
- Province: Overijssel
- City Hall: Kampen City Hall

Government
  - Body: Municipal council
  - Mayor: Sander de Rouwe (CDA)

Area
  - Total: 161.79 km^{2} (62.47 sq mi)
  - Land: 142.18 km^{2} (54.90 sq mi)
  - Water: 19.61 km^{2} (7.57 sq mi)
- Elevation: 1 m (3.3 ft)

Population (January 2021)
  - Total: 54,474
  - Density: 383/km^{2} (990/sq mi)
- Demonym: Kampenaar
- Time zone: UTC+1 (CET)
  - Summer (DST): UTC+2 (CEST)
- Postcode: 8260–8279
- Area code: 038
- Website: www.kampen.nl

Kampen (Dutch pronunciation: [ˈkɑmpə(n)]) is a city and municipality in the province of Overijssel, Netherlands. A member of the former Hanseatic League, it is located at the lower reaches of the river IJssel.

The municipality of Kampen had a population of 54,474 in 2021 and covers an area of 161.79 square kilometres (62.47 square miles). Kampen is located in the North West of Overijssel and is the largest city in this region. The city of Kampen itself has around 37,000 inhabitants.

Kampen has one of the best preserved old town centres of the Netherlands, including remains of the ancient city wall (of which three gates are still standing) and numerous churches. Also notable are the three bridges over the IJssel which connect Kampen with IJsselmuiden and Kampereiland, the agricultural area between the branches which form the IJssel delta, and a windmill (d' Olde Zwarver – the Old Vagabond). Since November 2018, the town and some communes are on a river island. Between the 14th and 16th century it was one of the biggest towns in the Northern Netherlands (modern day European Netherlands). The town is about 90 kilometer northeast of Amsterdam.

Traditionally people in Kampen speak a variation of the Sallands dialect, known as Kampers.

== History ==
=== Middle Ages ===
By 1150, there were already wooden buildings on the site where Kampen is currently located. The name Kampen, however, is not mentioned until 1277. The city has had city rights since 1236. As a result of its convenient location on the busy trade route between the Zuiderzee and the Rhine, Kampen quickly developed from simple settlements into a prosperous trading town, to become one of the most powerful and leading cities of northwestern Europe. In the 14th century, Kampen exchanged with the bishop of Utrecht, Jan van Arkel, the Mastenbroek polder against the right to increase the IJsseldelta.

The silting up of the IJssel brought a gradual end to the prosperity of Kampen from 1430 on. For a long time Kampen did not want to sign a union and make economic and political concessions to other cities, as was usual in the Hanseatic League. When the County of Holland went to war with the Hanseatic League this situation came to an end: the city was forced to choose a side in the war. Kampen was originally more oriented toward the Baltic trade and commerce with the hinterland of the Rhine, and therefore in 1441 formally joined the Hanseatic League. The city had much influence in the League; despite loud protests from the other towns in lower reaches of the IJssel and from other Hanseatic cities, the League agreed in 1448 to build a bridge over the river. This project was accomplished in just five months. With this bridge Kampen hoped to be able to develop closer relationships with the hinterland.

=== Post-Medieval ===
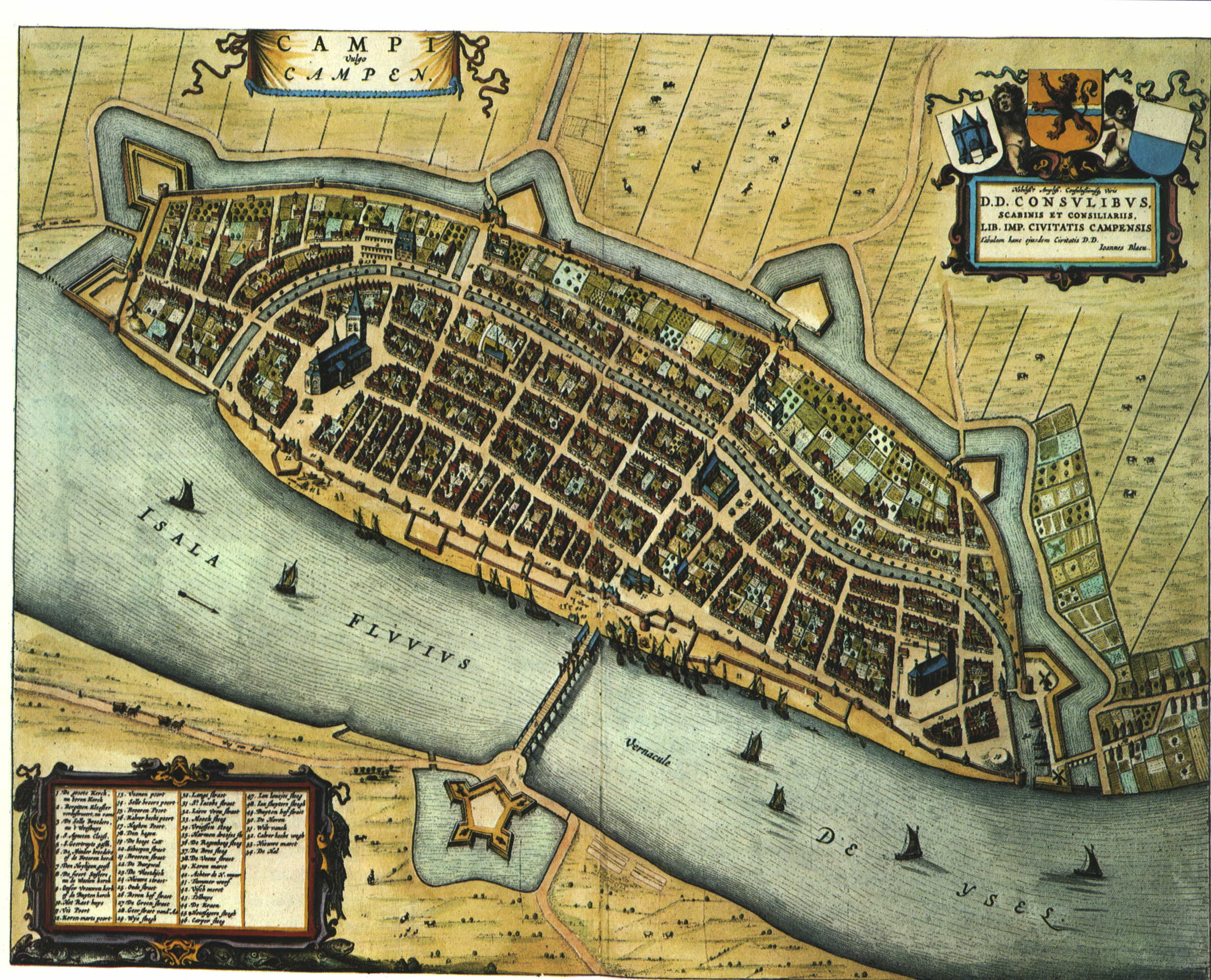
Kampen (Blaeu's Toonneel der Steden Dutch city maps, by Willem and Joan Blaeu, 1652

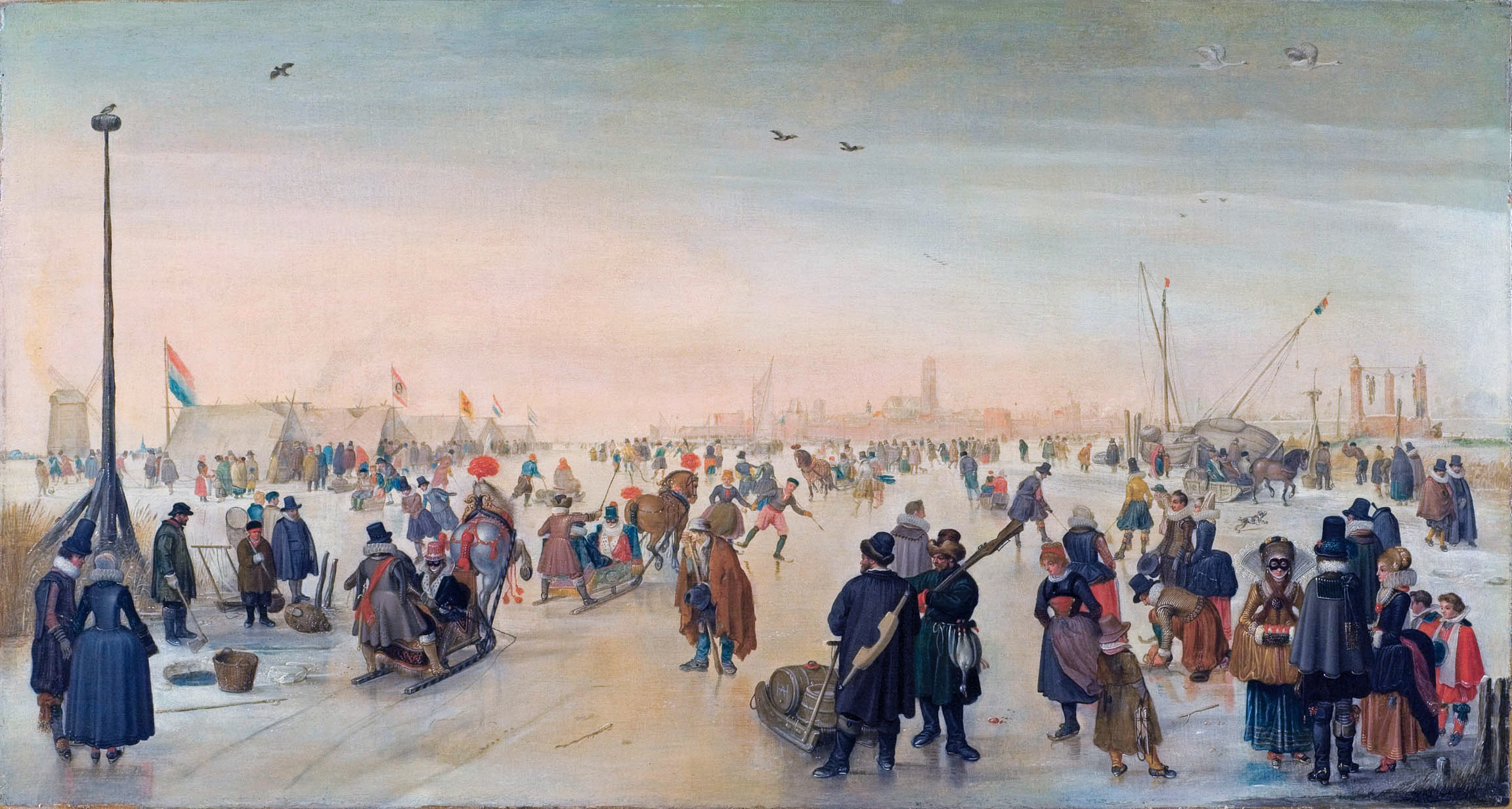
Winter landscape with skaters c. 1625

On 11 August 1572 Kampen was conquered from the Spaniards by Willem van den Bergh, a brother of William of Orange. After the massacre of Zutphen on 15 November, the city voluntarily surrendered to the Spanish. In 1578, the city changed ownership again after the Siege of Kampen, led by George van Lalaing. Due to its right to increase the IJsseldelta, Kampen was owner of the growing Kampereiland. From 1500 the islands were leased. The rents were so large that the city did not need to raise taxes.

In October 1670, Kampen was the first of four Dutch cities to raise capital by issuing a Tontine.

The Franco-Dutch War, fought by the Republic of the United Netherlands against the Kingdom of France, Sweden, the Bishopric of Münster, the Archbishopric of Cologne and the Kingdom of England, marked a definitive end to the enormous power of the city.

Kampen became well known again in the 19th century. The city was difficult to reach from the sea, because the surrounding wetlands became silted up and shallow. During the preceding centuries, the watercourse of the river IJssel was dredged several times, but the costs were relatively high and within a few years, the river silted up again. As the IJssel had several delta-like mouths here, the main route of the river shifted several times. In the 19th century, a new strategy was put in place to counter this problem: some watercourses were dammed to allow for more water at a higher speed through one or two main routes. This had the advantage that less sand and silt were deposited and resulted in a river course that "swept itself clean". A key figure in this story is city architect Nicolaas Plomp, who, besides his work for the current IJssel front of the city of Kampen, was also involved in hydraulic engineering. Due to the emerging industry in the 19th century and the importance of roads and railways for the economy, highways and paved roads were constructed to replace transportation over sand and mud roads.

== Geography ==
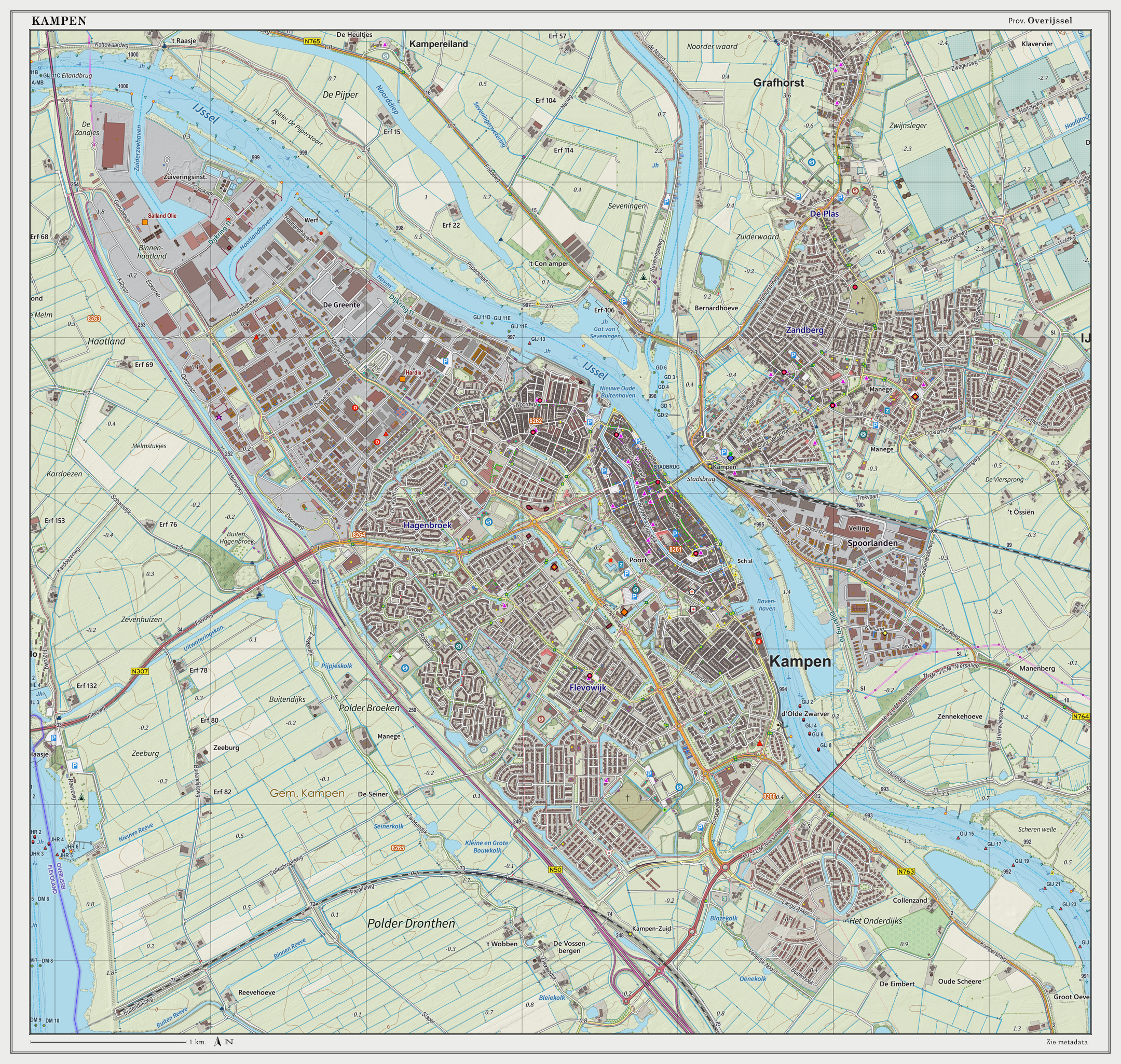
Topographic map of the city of Kampen, March 2014

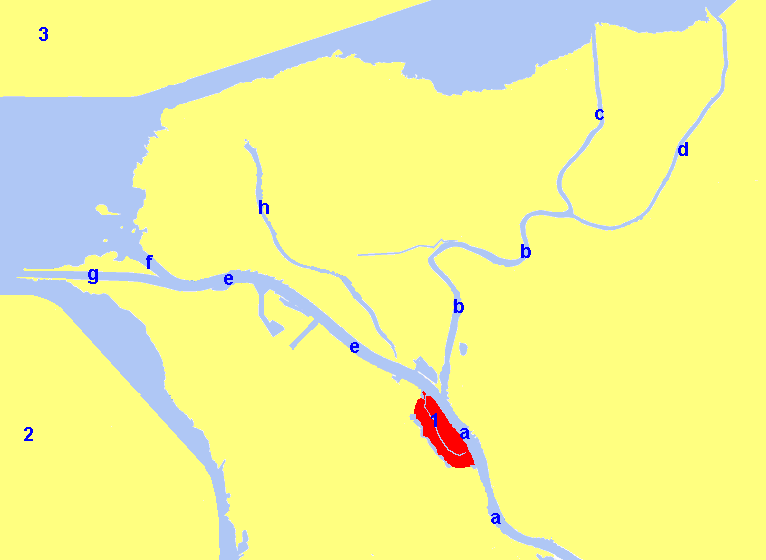
1. Primary channel: river IJssel; 2. Secondary channel: IJssel (19th century); Ganzendiep (modern); 3. Secondary channel: Ganzendiep; 4. Secondary channel: Goot; 5. Primary channel: Regtediep (19th century); River IJssel (modern); 6. Secondary channel: Regtediep (19th century); Kattendiep (modern); 7. Primary channel: Keteldiep; 8. Secondary channel: Noorderdiep (19th century); Noorddiep (modern); 1. Historical city center of Kampen; 2. Oost-Flevoland polder, province of Flevoland; 3. Noordoostpolder, Flevoland; All other land areas on the map are part of the region of Salland in the province of Overijssel.

Kampen is part of the province of Overijssel ('Over-IJssel' i.e. (mostly) trans-/across the river IJssel, as seen from the perspective of the bishopric of Utrecht by which it was held until 1528) in the Eastern part of The Netherlands, situated between the provinces of Gelderland, Flevoland, Drenthe and Friesland.

The city of Kampen is situated at the mouth of the river IJssel. Opposite Kampen, along the IJssel, lies IJsselmuiden, which is the second largest residential nucleus of the municipality Kampen.

The municipality of Kampen has five other population centers: Grafhorst, 's-Heerenbroek, Kamperveen, Wilsum and Zalk.

== Culture ==
=== Historical landmarks ===
Kampen has a large number of old buildings, including remains of the ancient city wall (whose city gates are still standing) and the Church of St Nicholas (Bovenkerk). The structure of the walled fortress city is still visible in the streets.

Significant structures include:

- The Koornmarktpoort: a city gate located near the river IJssel which probably dates from the 14th century. In the 15th century two squat towers were added at the outer corners.
- The Broederpoort: a rectangular city gate with four slender towers, originally from 1465, rebuilt in Renaissance style in 1615
- The Cellebroederspoort: a rectangular city gate, flanked by two heavy round towers, originally from 1465, rebuilt in 1617 in Renaissance style
- The Stedelijk Museum Kampen: located in the former town hall of Kampen, which dates from the late 14th century
- The Gotisch huis: built around 1500. This was the location of the Stedelijk Museum Kampen before it moved to its current location in the old town hall.
- The Nieuwe Toren: a tower with a carillon designed by Philips Vingboons and dating from 1648 to 1664
- The Church of St. Nicholas (Bovenkerk): a Gothic basilica dating from the 14th and 15th centuries. The interior of the church houses an early-Renaissance choir screen (1552), a stone pulpit (circa 1500) and a monumental organ from 1670 to 1676.
- The Broederkerk: a 14th-century church which originally belonged to a Franciscan monastery
- The Buitenkerk: a 14th-century church
- The Burgwalkerk: a neoclassical 19th-century church
- A windmill called d'Olde Zwarver, built in 1842
- A monastery gate dating from 1665 called Linnenweverspoortje
- The city auditorium (Stadsgehoorzaal), dating from 1891
- An old tobacco factory, De Olifant, where cigars are still made with 19th-century equipment. De Olifant cigars are sold in the shop.

Throughout the town of Kampen, there are colorful murals which are in fact old commercials for now-defunct business in Kampen. These murals, which include Art Nouveau influences, were made by local artists and are now referred to as "frescoes of the middle class". As a result of current municipal policy, wherever these murals are discovered under old plaster, they are restored.

Notable individuals with a connection to Kampen are honoured with a commemorative stone bearing their name and achievements . These stones are incorporated into the pavement of the Oude Raadhuisplein (formerly Koeplein), the square in between the old town hall, the former Post Office and Nieuwe Toren.

=== Gallery ===
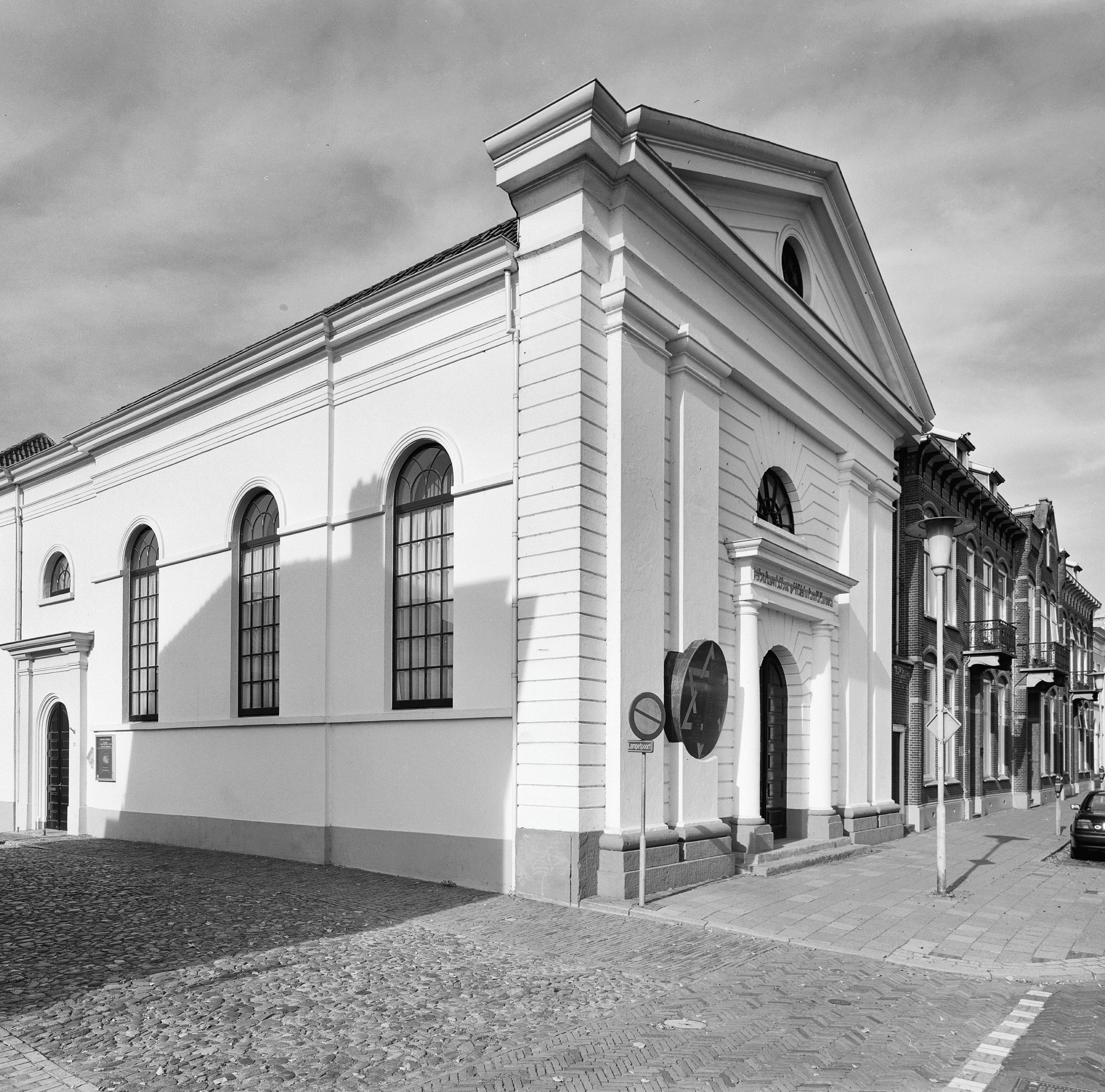
Former synagogue in Kampen

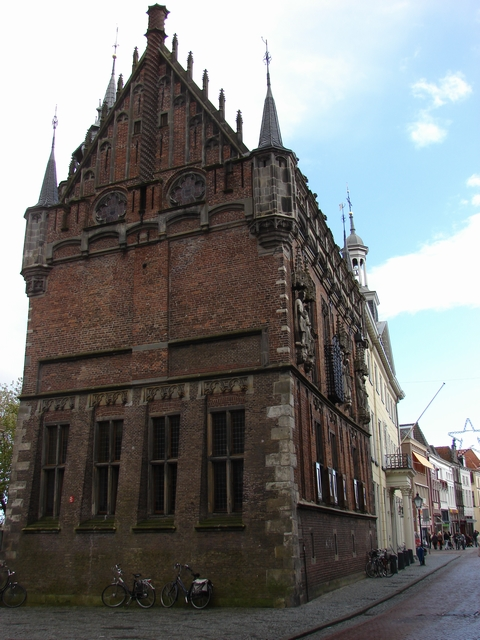
Former town hall

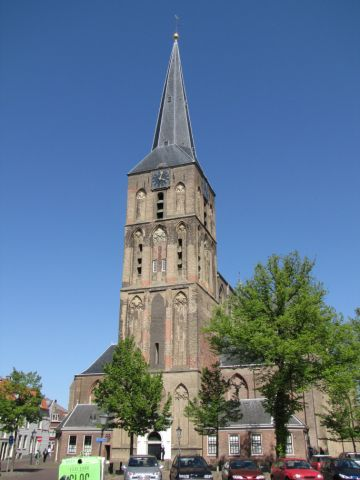
Church: Bovenkerk

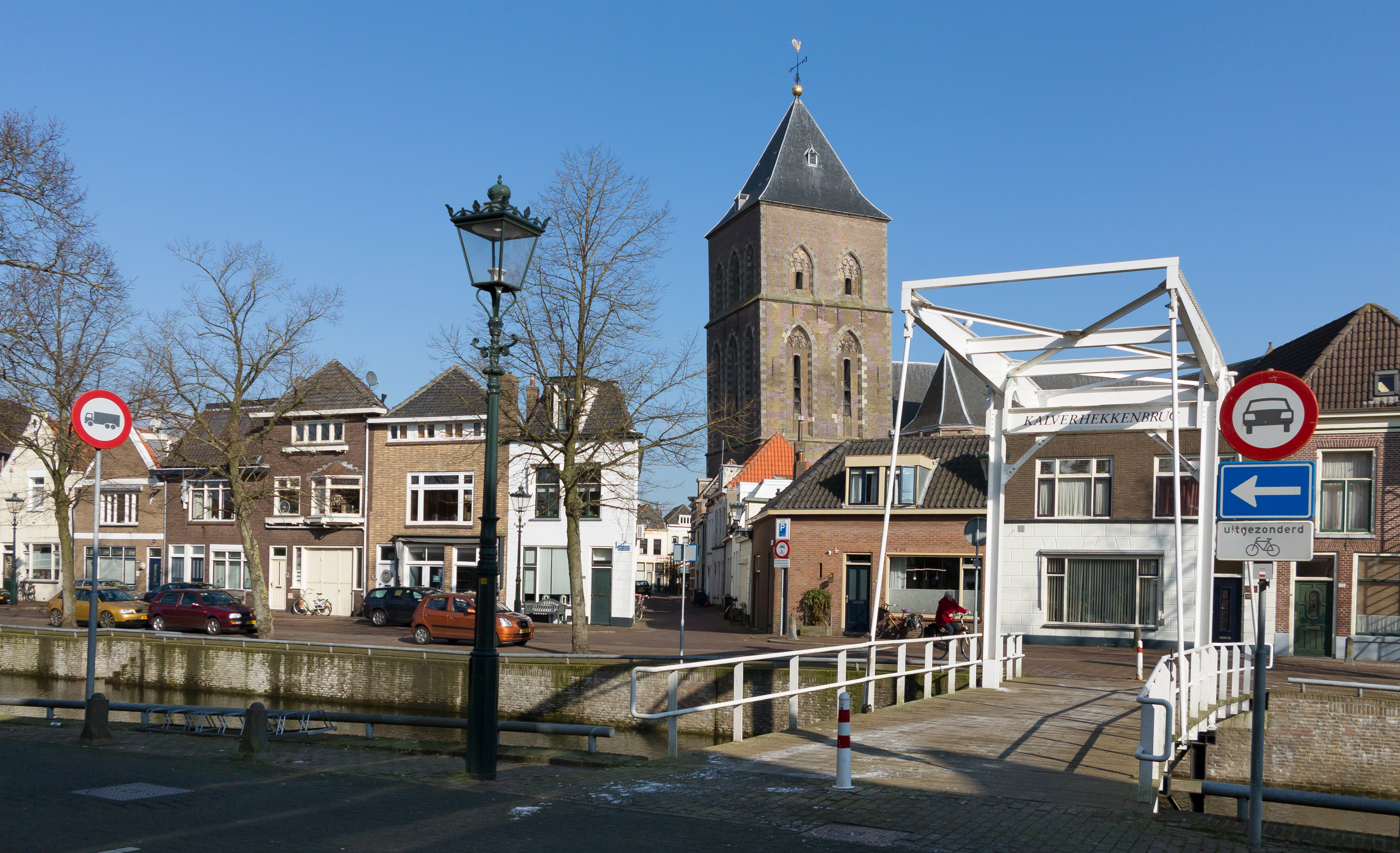
Bridge (Kalverhekkenbrug) and church (Buitenkerk)

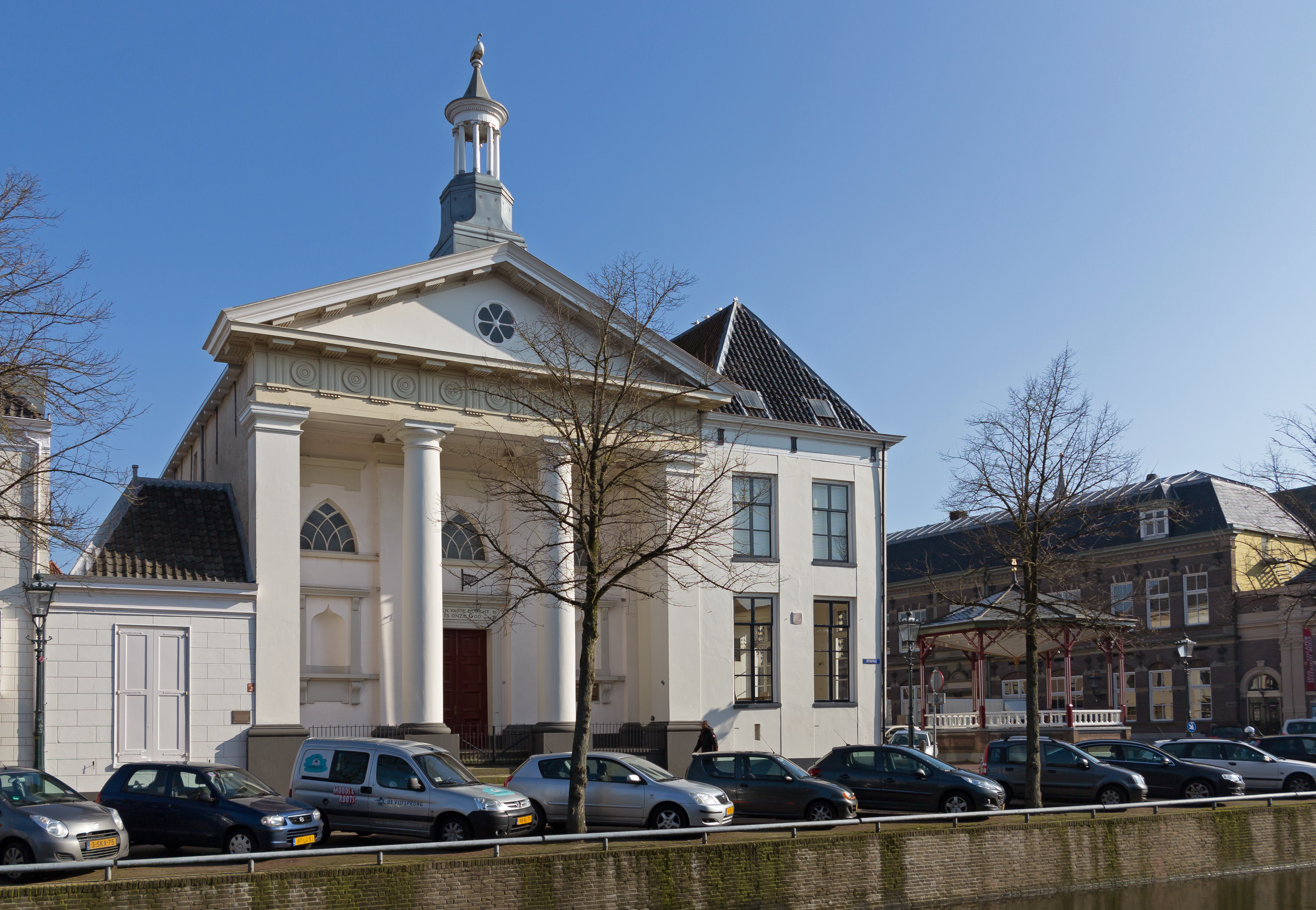
Reformed church

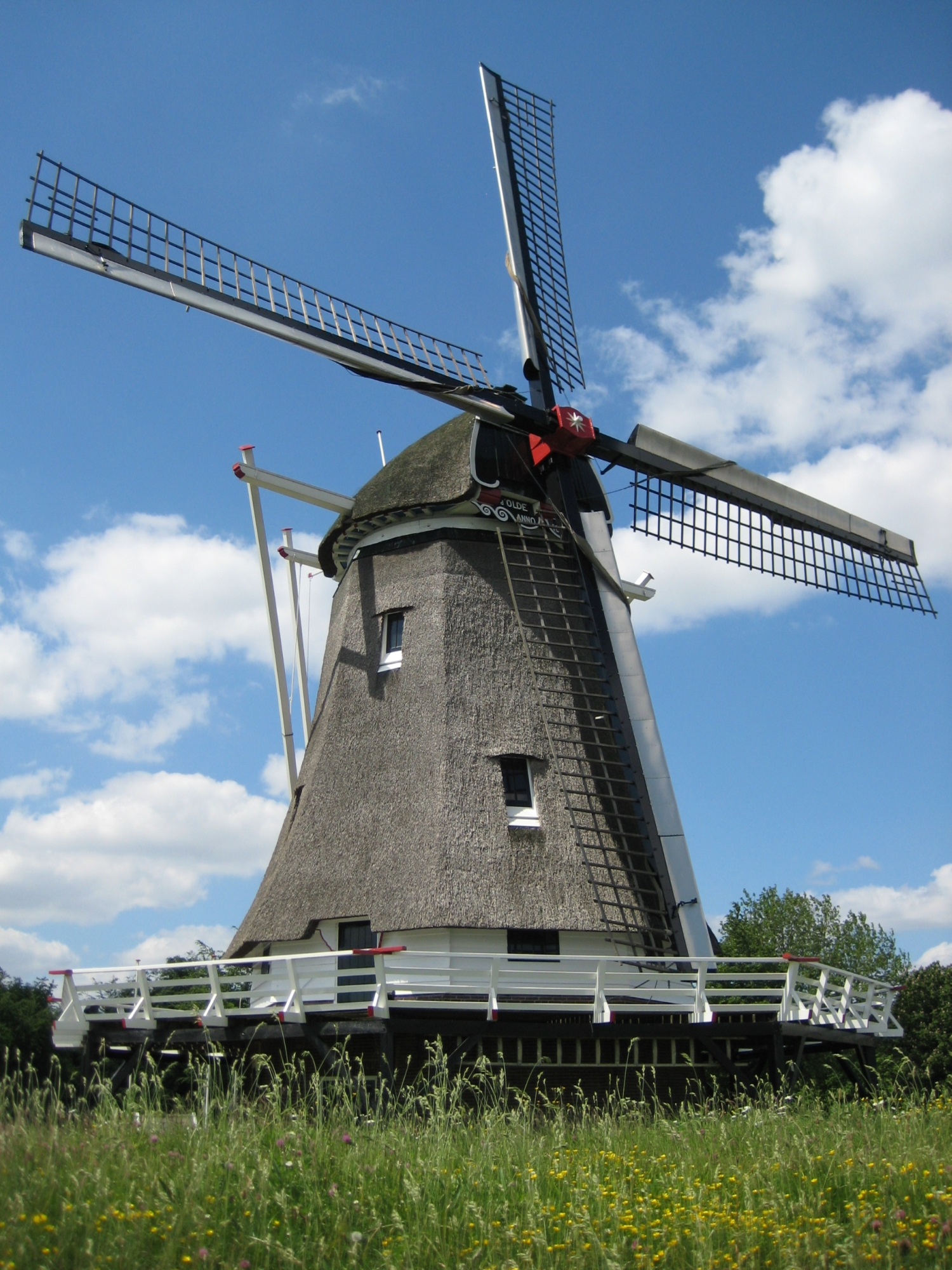
Windmill: d' Olde Zwarver

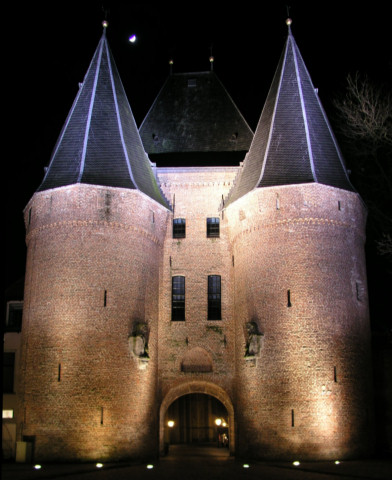
Towngate: Korenmarktpoort

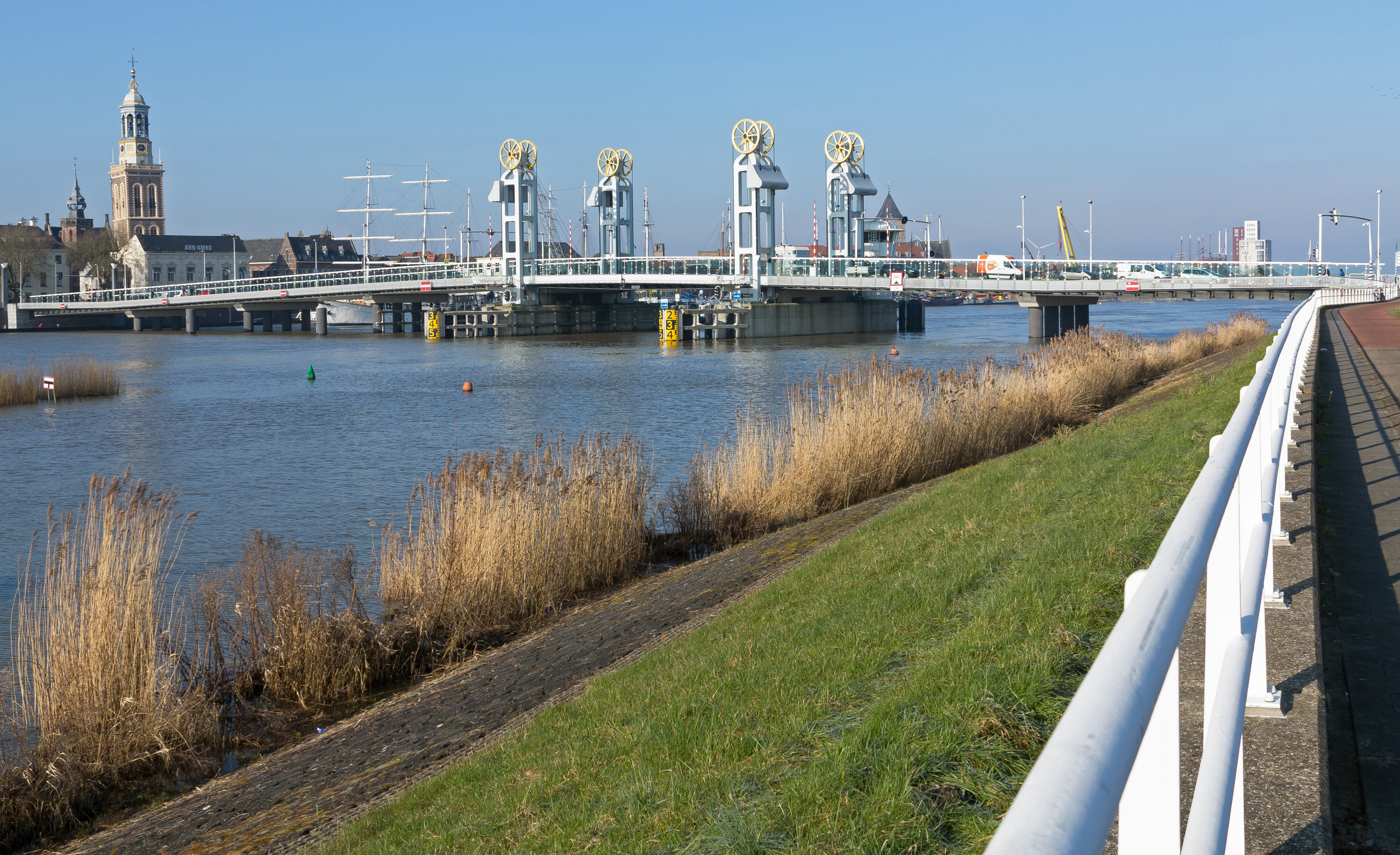
Bridge: Stadsbrug

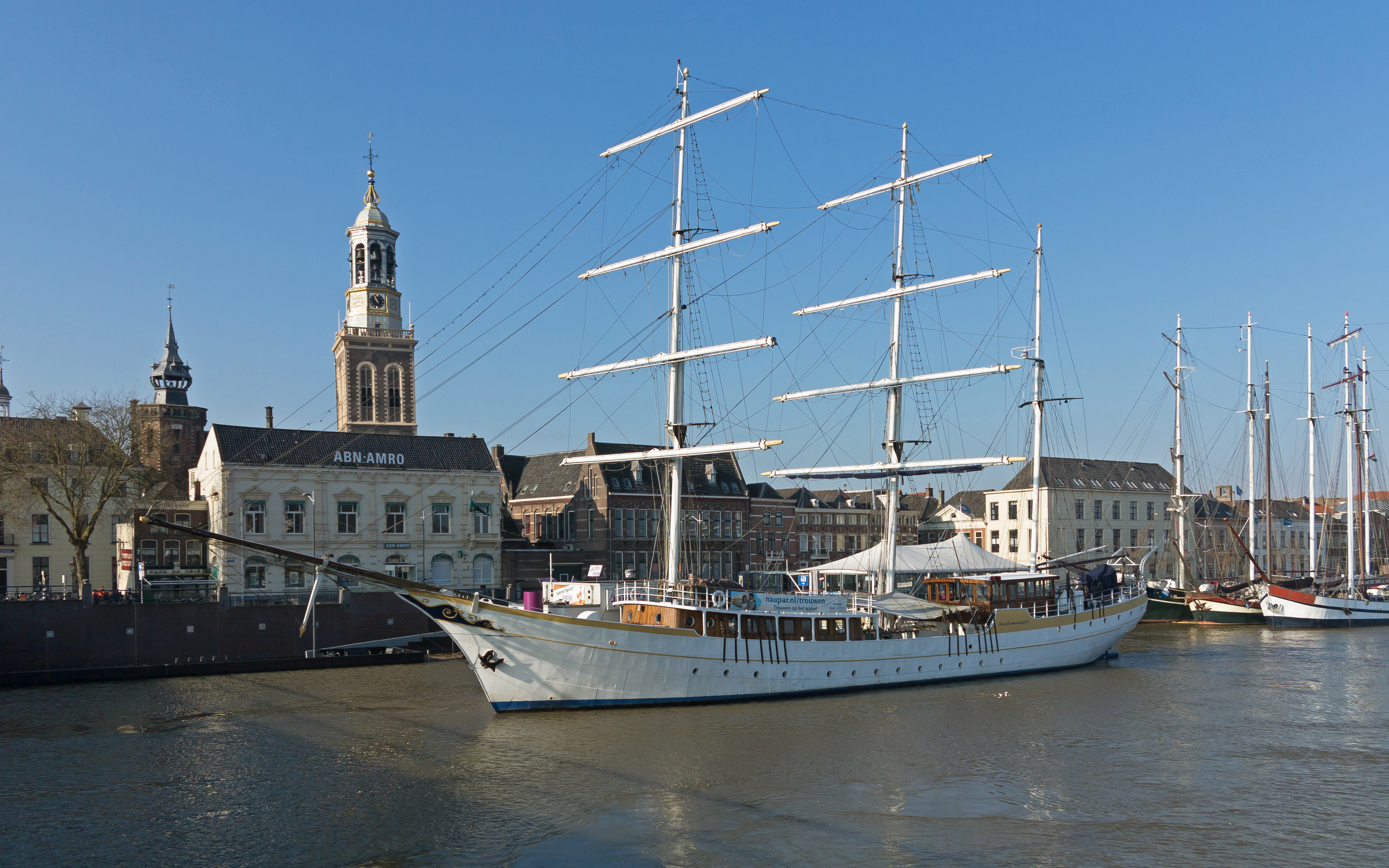
Ship at the IJsselkade

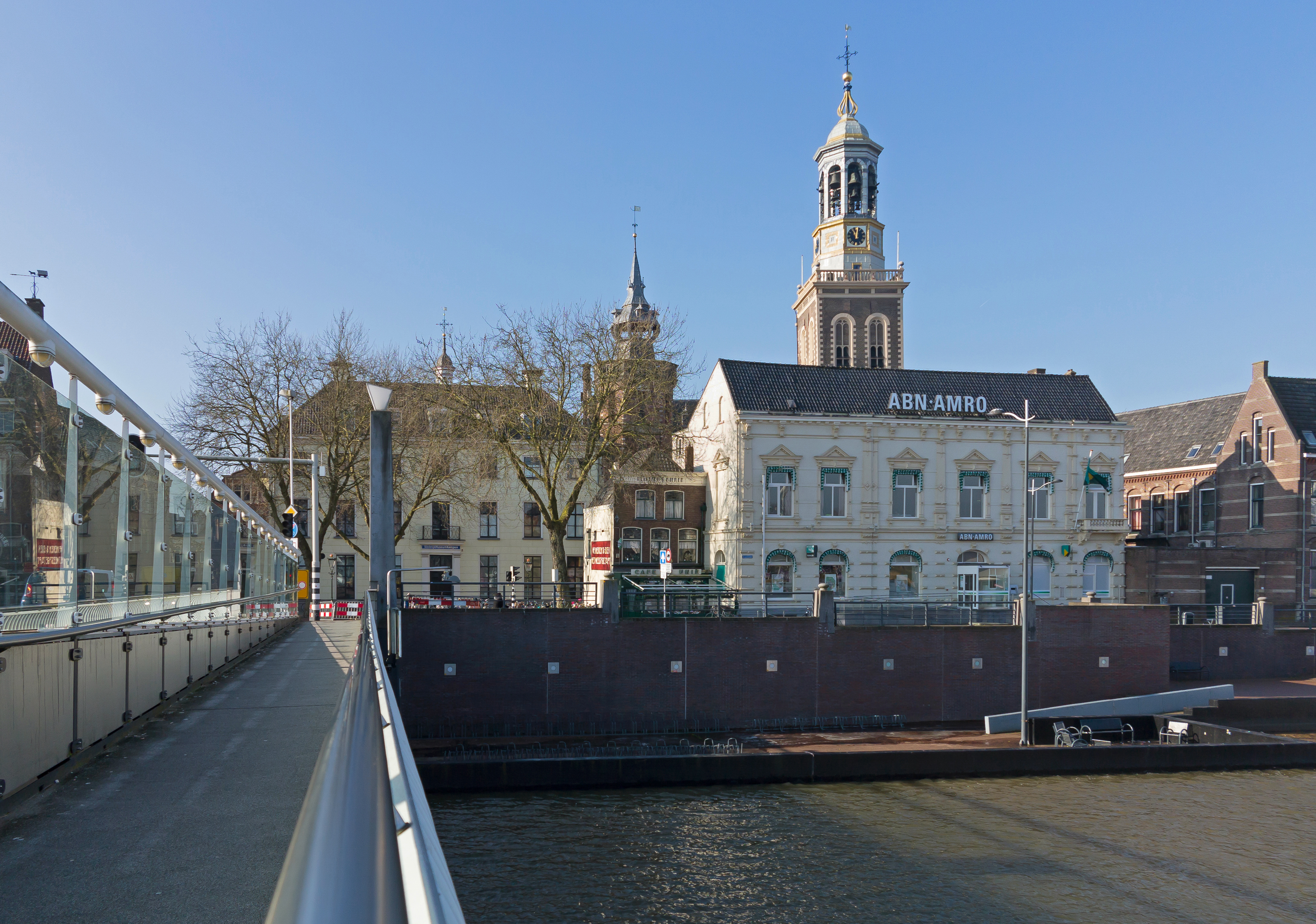
Office building of the ABN AMRO bank at the IJsselkade

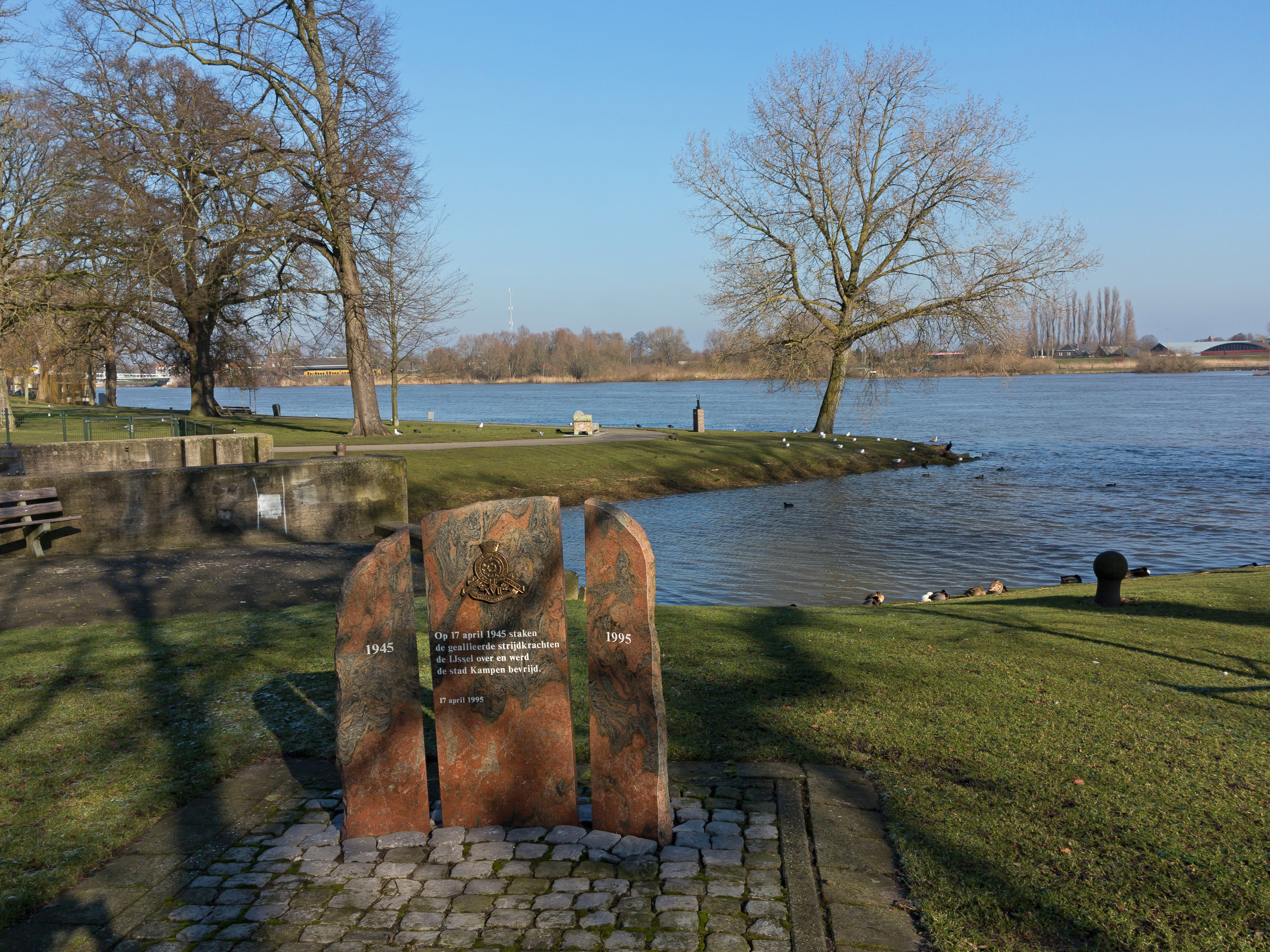
Liberation memorial at the De La Sablonairekade

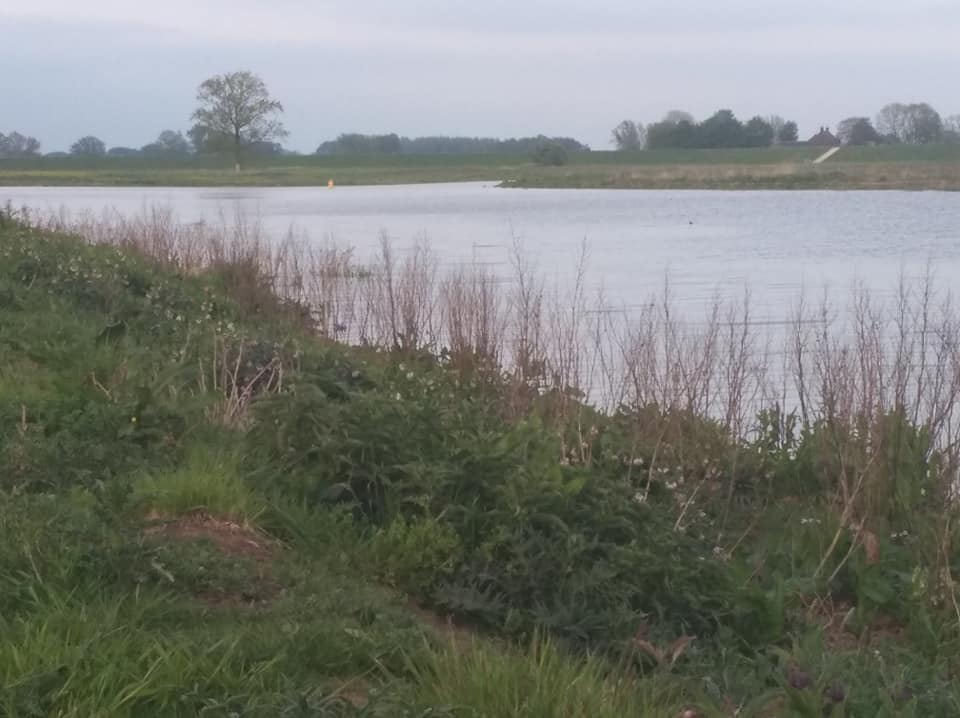
The new Anabranch called Reevediep

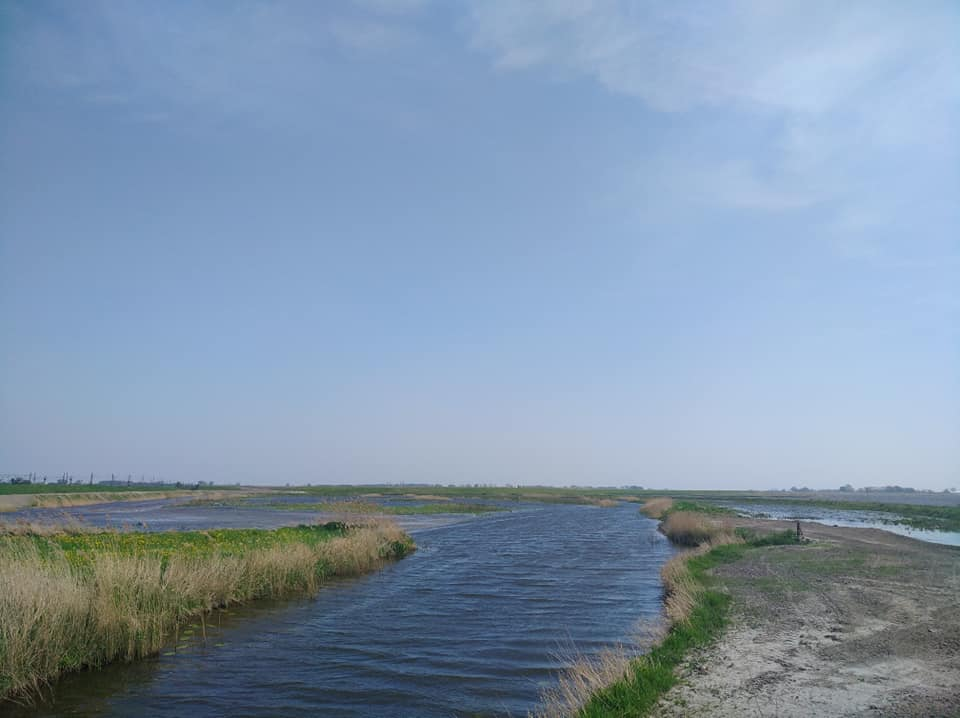
The westside of the island of Kampen, with marches going into the Drontermeer

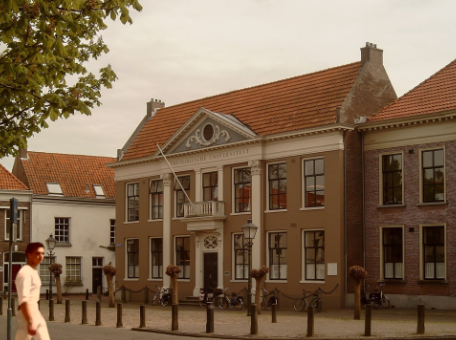
Protestant Theological University Kampen

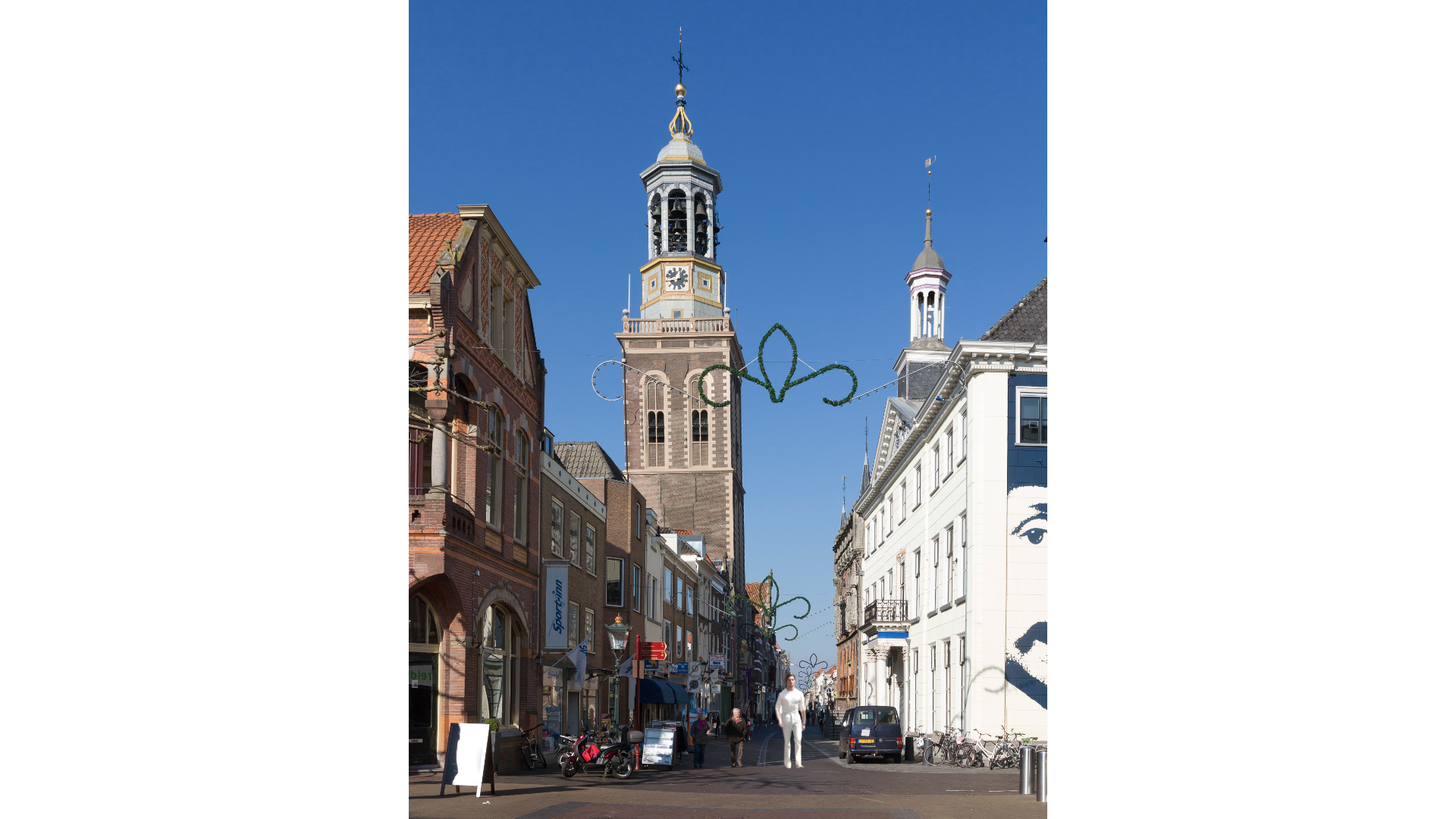
New Tower (Nieuwe Toren)

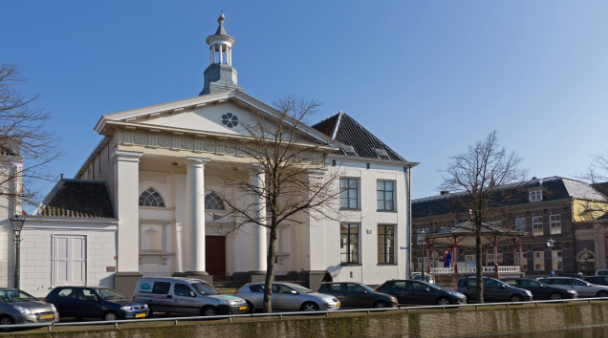
Cellebroederspoort in Kampen

=== Festivals and events ===
An annual festival during the summer months is the Kamper ui(t) day. The name is derived from a series of folk tales in which the inhabitants of Kampen were portrayed as stupid. Another summer event is the Full Color Festival, which is organized annually. Every third Saturday of August, a comics event, called the Kamper Stripspektakel, is organized with over 100 booths.

Once every three years Sail Kampen takes place, a sailing spectacle with (old) sailing ships.

A weekend before Christmas Christmas in Oud Kampen is organized. There is street theater, where pieces of famous musicals are played, and mid-nineteenth-century characters are walking around the city.

=== Sports ===
Kampen is the home of football team Go Ahead Kampen and its rivals Dos Kampen, KHC Kampen, VV Kampen and IJVV.

=== Humor ===
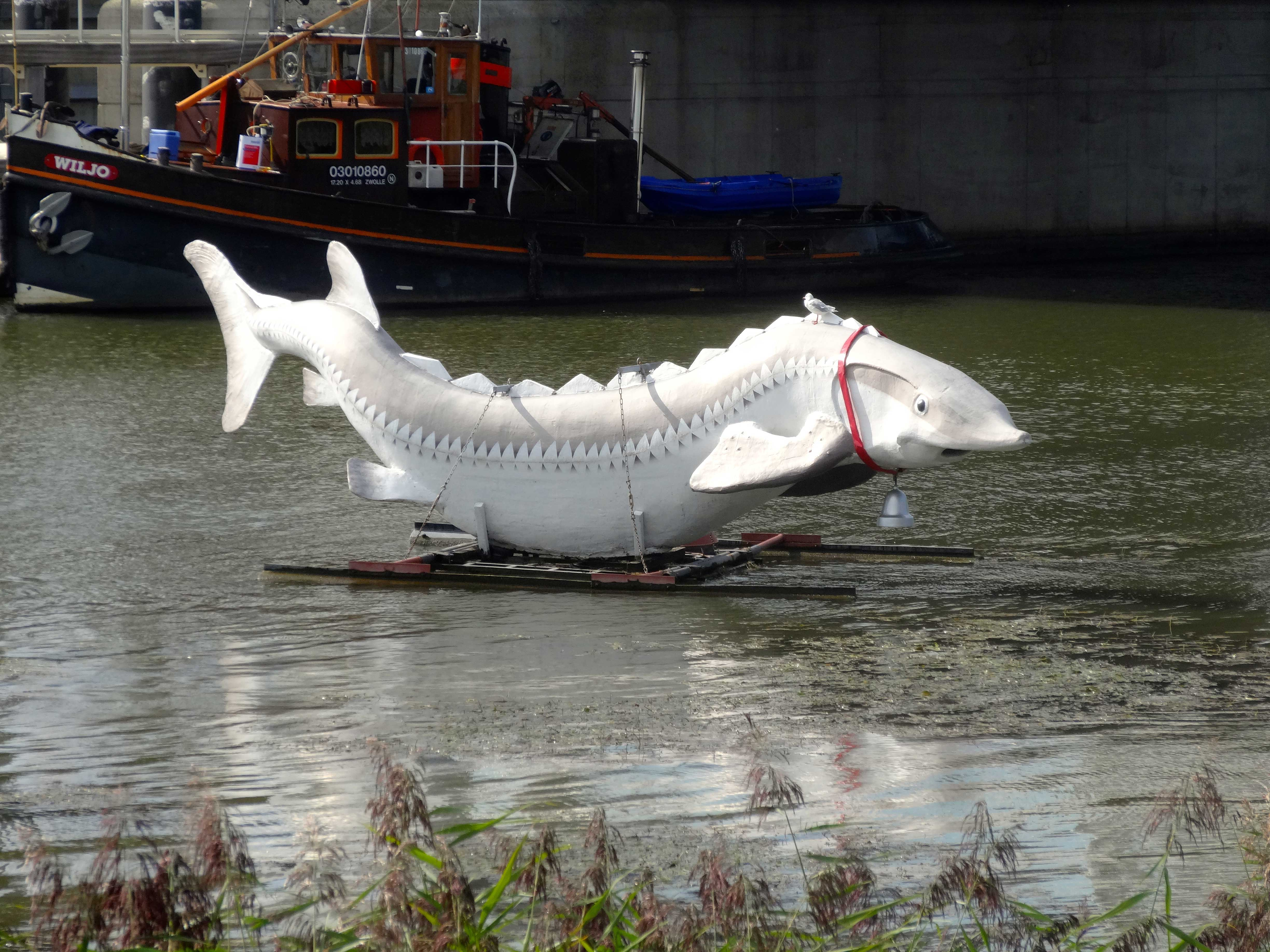
Kamper Sturgeon with a cowbell

The foolish wisdom of the residents of the Dutch city of Kampen gave rise to the term "Kamper onion" (Kamper ui, plural: Kamper uien) for town-of-fools type stories, as well for the "Kampersteur" ("Kamper Sturgeon") dish, which is made not of sturgeon, but of eggs: to greet a visiting bishop the Kampers caught a large sturgeon, and to keep it fresh they tied a cowbell to it and let it back in water. When the bishop arrived, the fish was gone, and a dish made of eggs was served instead. The "onion" in "Kamper onion" comes from the tale, variants of which are known in various cultures: a tramp convinces a farmer and his wife that he knows how to cook a nutritious stew from onion and salt. But while cooking he adds plenty of other stuff "to improve the taste".

== Twin towns ==
Kampen is twinned with:

Eilat, Israel; Meinerzhagen, Germany	Soest, Germany; Pápa, Hungary

== Transportation ==
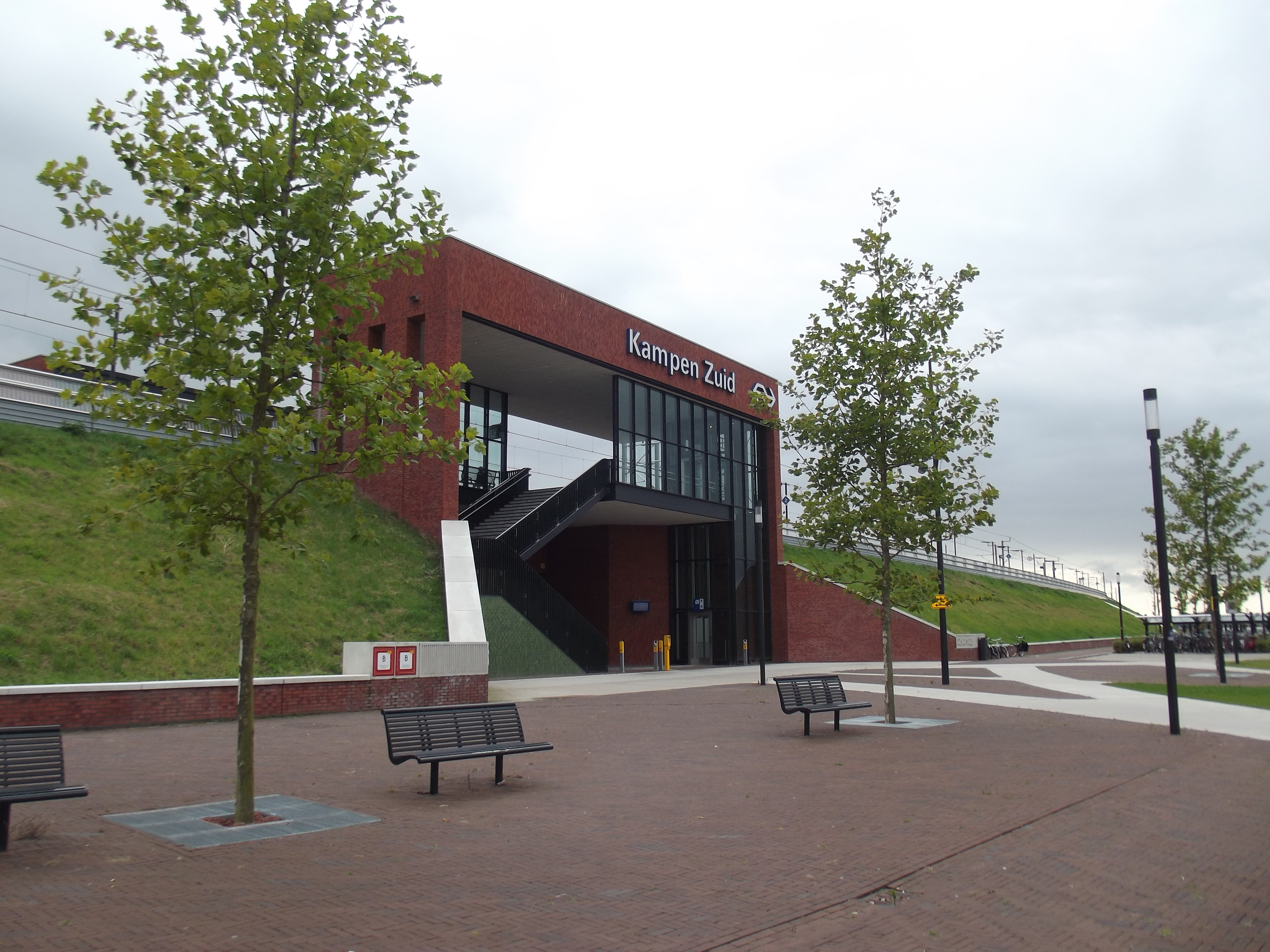
Kampen South railway station

The Kampen railway station opened in 1865 as terminus of the Kamperlijntje branch from Overijssel's capital city Zwolle. It is served by a non-stop diesel service on a single track. The line was renovated in 2017 to be electrified. In December 2017, Keolis Nederland took over the line, after Nederlandse Spoorwegen lost the line in a tendering process. There is an alternative railway connection with Zwolle via the Hanzelijn, which links Zwolle with Amsterdam via Dronten, Lelystad and Almere. It was inaugurated by Queen Beatrix in December 2012. Kampen Zuid railway station was built a few kilometers south of Kampen near the junction of the national roads N50 and N764, where a new residential development is planned. Somewhat confusingly, there was a Kampen Zuid railway station in existence before, between 1 October 1913 and 15 May 1934. This was the terminus of the Kampen–Hattem railway line, which connected with the Zwolle–Apeldoorn service via Wapenveld and Heerde. Surface roads connecting the city include N760, N763, N765 and N307.

== Education ==
Kampen had two theological universities: the Theological University of the Protestant Church in the Netherlands (PThU) and the theological college of the Reformed Church of the Netherlands (TUK).

== Notable residents ==
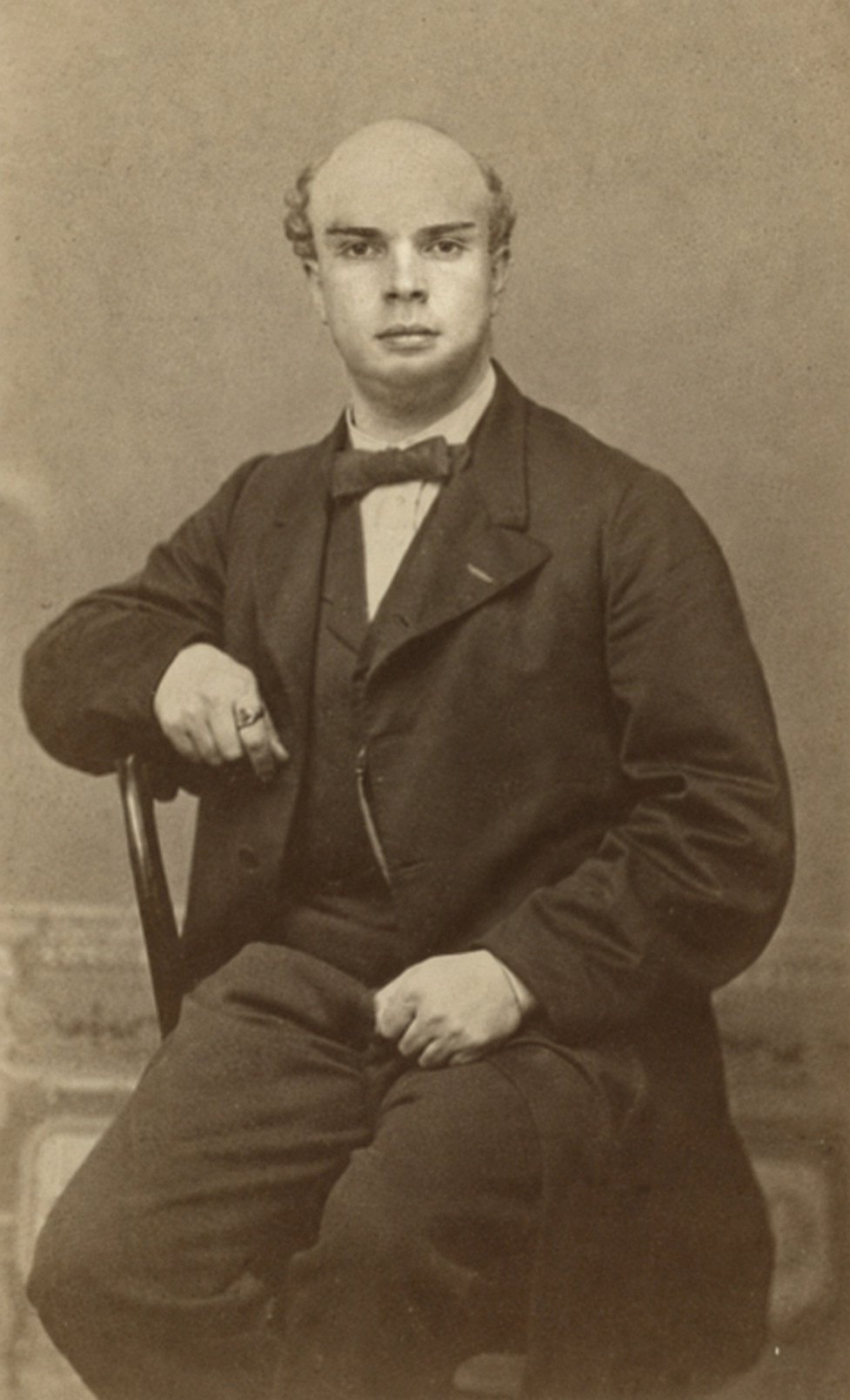
Jacob Eduard van Heemskerck van Beest, 1870s

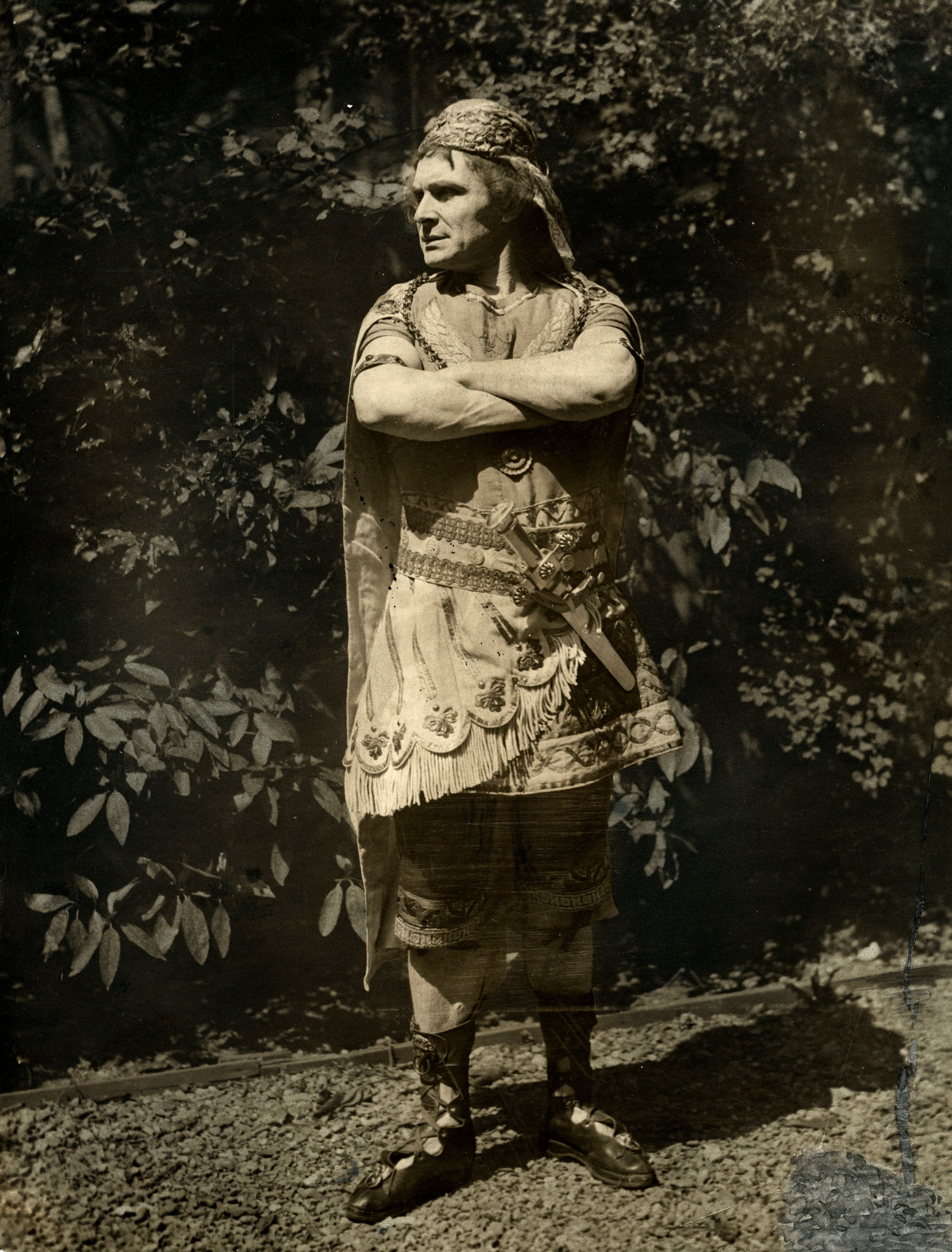
Coen Hissink, 1917

=== The arts ===
- Hendrick Avercamp (1585 – 1634 in Kampen) a painter of small winter landscapes
- Barent Avercamp (1612 in Kampen – 1679) a Dutch painter
- Jacob Eduard van Heemskerck van Beest (1828 in Kampen – 1894) a Dutch painter
- Coen Hissink (1878 in Kampen – 1942) a Dutch film actor of the silent era
- Ida Gerhardt (1905 in Gorinchem – 1997) Dutch poet and classicist.
- Gerard Hengeveld (1910 in Kampen – 2001) pianist, harpsichordist and composer.
- Sybren Polet (1924 in Kampen – 2015) a Dutch prose writer and poet
- Gait L. Berk (1927 in Kampen – 2006) writer and film maker about boats and trees
- Henk van Ulsen (born 1927 in Kampen – 2009 ) actor
- Klaas Jan Mulder (1930 in Kampen - 2008) Dutch organist, pianist and conductor.
- Wim Ramaker (1943 in Kampen – 1992) Dutch broadcaster, writer and poet
- Harry van der Kamp (1947 in Kampen – 2026) bass-baritone, ensemble leader and singer

=== Public thinking & public service ===
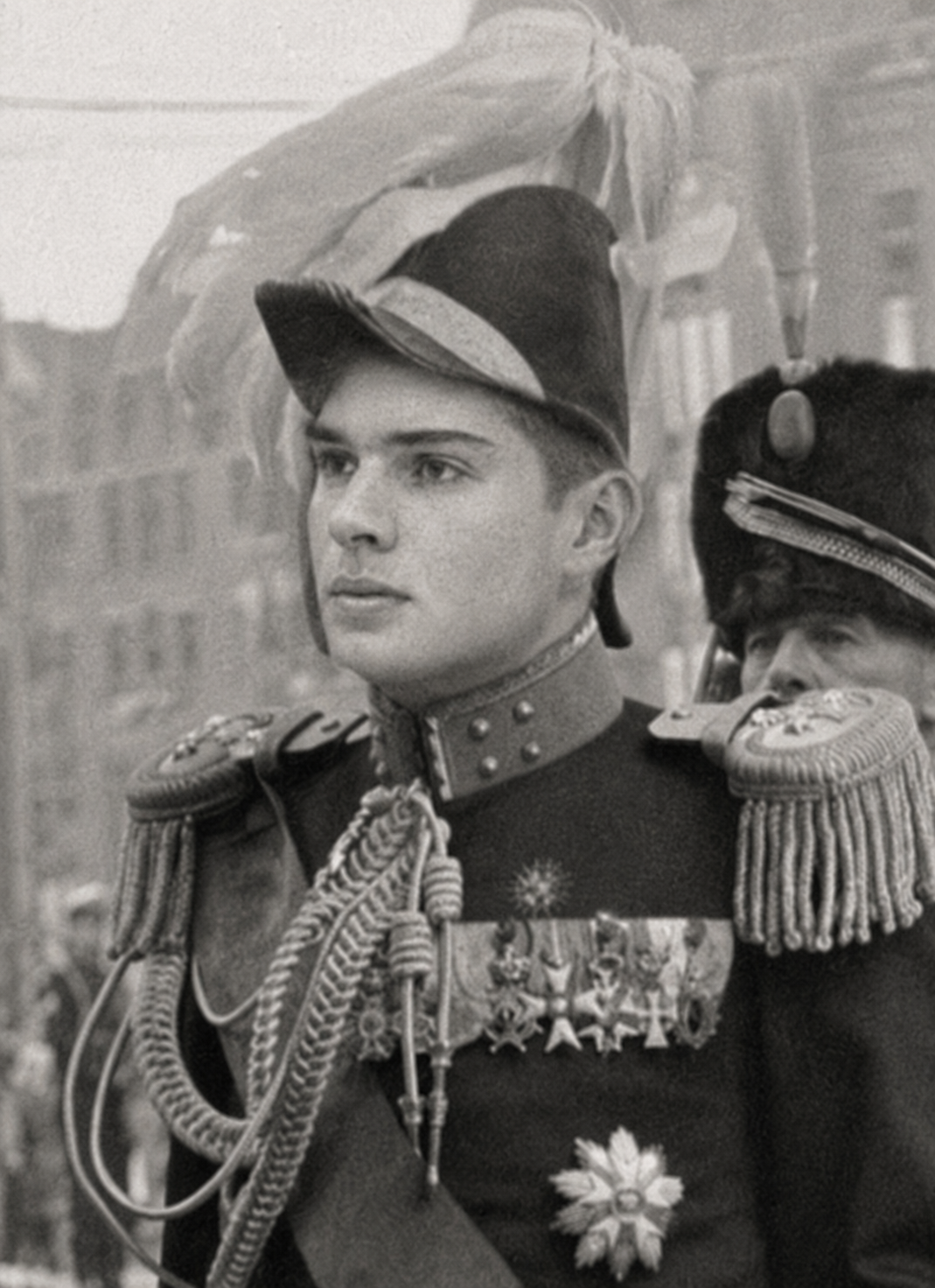
Godfried van Voorst tot Voorst, 1948

- Albert Pighius (ca. 1490 in Kampen - 1542) a Dutch Roman Catholic theologian, mathematician and astronomer.
- Jacob van Deventer (ca.1500/1505 in Kampen – 1575) a Dutch cartographer
- Andries Hudde (1608 in Kampen – 1663) landowner and colonial official of New Netherland
- François Adriaan van der Kemp (1752 in Kampen – 1829) a Dutch radical leaders of the Patriots
- Jan Willem de Winter (1761 in Kampen – 1812) a Dutch admiral of the Napoleonic Wars
- Pieter Hendrik van Zuylen van Nijevelt (1782 in Kampen – 1825) a Dutch count and baron and Army general
- Francina Broese Gunningh (1783 in Kampen - 1824) a Dutch soldier
- Jean-Pierre Cluysenaar (1811 in Kampen – 1880) a Belgian architect
- Hendrik Tonneboeijer (1814 in Kampen – 1837) a Dutch colonial officer in Dutch Gold Coast
- Lucien von Römer (1873 in Kampen - 1965), a Dutch physician, botanist and writer
- Jan Joseph Godfried, Baron van Voorst tot Voorst Jr. (1880 in Kampen – 1963) commander of the Dutch armed forces during WWII and strategist
- Klaas Schilder (1890 in Kampen – 1952) Reformed theologian and professor in the Reformed Churches in the Netherlands
- Adriaan Schuurman, Dutch Wiki (1904 in Kampen – 1998) organist and Protestant church musician
- Wiert Berghuis, Dutch Wiki (1911 in Kampen - 1989) Mayor of Kampen 1952–1970, chairman of the Anti-Revolutionary Party
- Dr. Willem Johan Kolff (1911 in Leiden – 2009) physician at the former municipal hospital, pioneer of haemodialysis.
- G. A. den Hartogh (born 1943 in Kampen) a Dutch moral, legal and political philosopher

=== Sport ===
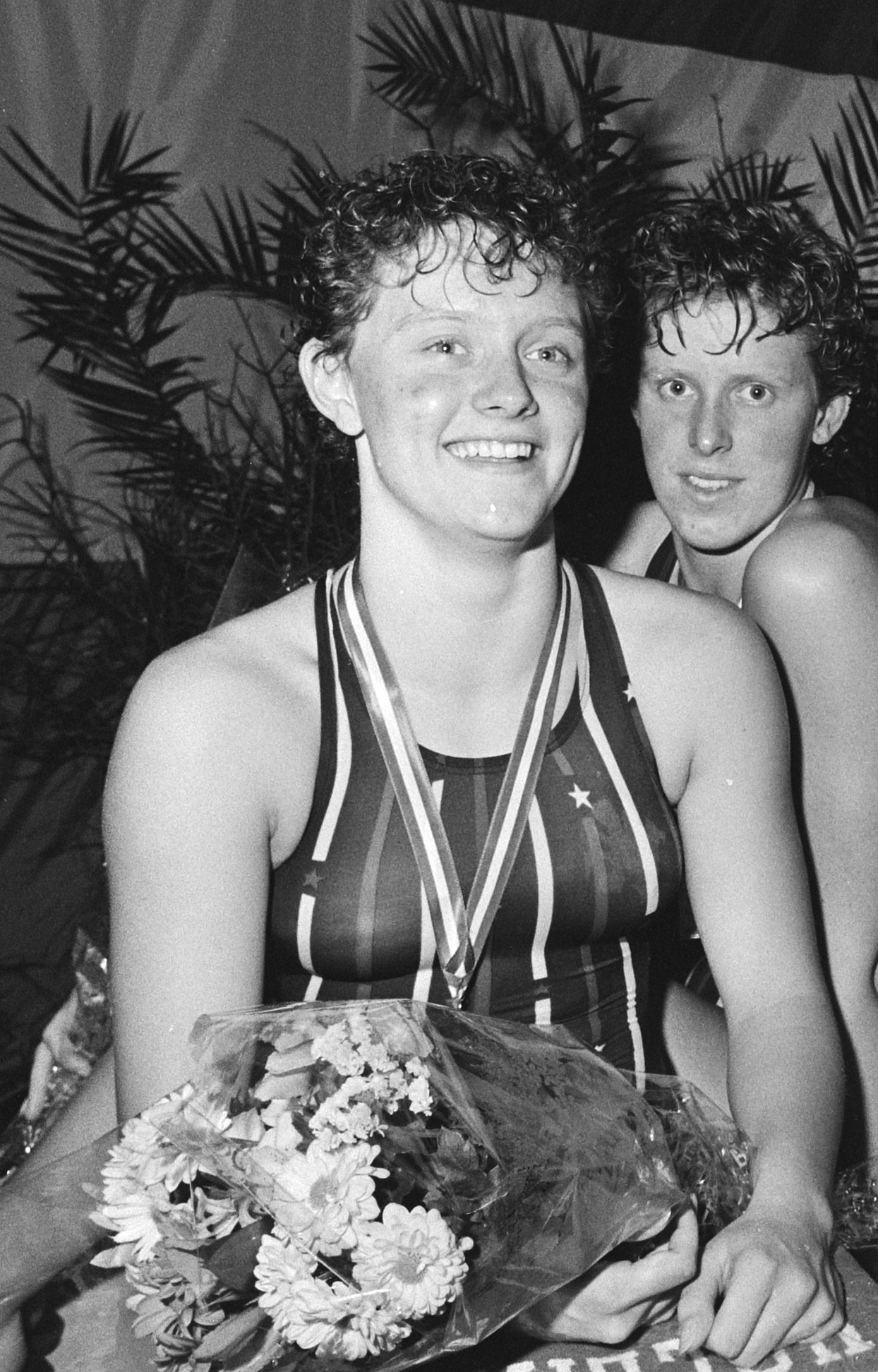
Petra van Staveren, 1984

- Benjamin Leussen (1876 in Kampen - 1924) chess master
- Petra van Staveren (born 1966 in Kampen), swimmer, golden medalist at the 1984 Summer Olympics
- Jaap Stam (born 1972 in Kampen), retired football player with 415 club caps
- Reinder Nummerdor (born 1976) a Dutch volleyball player, competed in five consecutive Summer Olympics
- Robert de Wilde (born 1977 in Kampen), BMX World Champion, competed at the 2008 Summer Olympics

=== Other ===
- Aalt Mondria (born 1957 in Kampen - 2011) a Dutch criminal and serial killer
