= Provincial road N763 (Netherlands) =

Road in the Netherlands

Provincial highway 763
- Provinciale weg 763
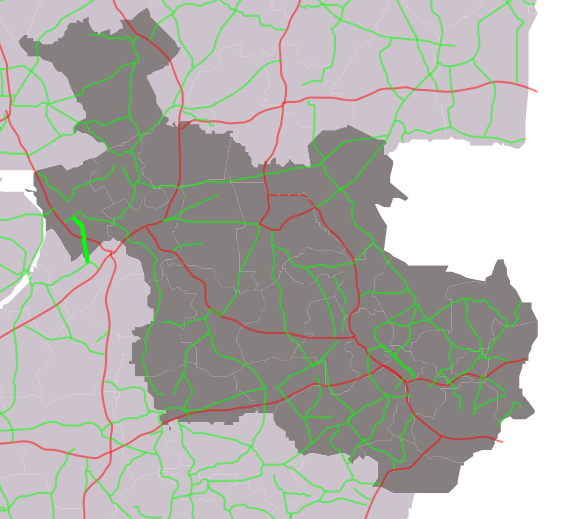

Major junctions
- South end: N 308 near Wezep
- North end: Europa-Allee in Kampen

Location
- Country: Kingdom of the Netherlands
- Constituent country: Netherlands
- Provinces: Gelderland, Overijssel
- Municipalities: Oldebroek, Kampen

Highway system
- Roads in the Netherlands; Motorways; E-roads; Provincial; City routes

Provincial road N763 (N763) is a road connecting N308 near Wezep with the Europa-Allee in Kampen.

== Route description ==
It passes under Rijksweg 50 (N50) and N764 without exits to them.
