= Koornmarktspoort =

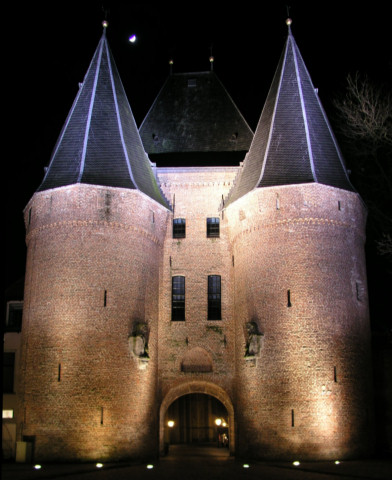
- Koornmarkt town gate by night
- Interactive map of the Koornmarktspoort area

General information
- Type: City gate
- Architectural style: military fortification
- Location: Kampen, Overijssel, IJsselkade 1
- Coordinates: 52°33′19″N 4°55′17″E
- Completed: 14th century
- Owner: Gemeente Kampen

The Koornmarktspoort is city gate in Kampen, Overijssel, the Netherlands. It was originally part of the city wall and is the oldest of the Kampen city gates.

== History ==
The central block and gate date from the fourteenth century while the two towers facing the river are probably from a later date. The rear of the building opens on the Koornmarkt (wheat market square), and the front faces the river IJssel.

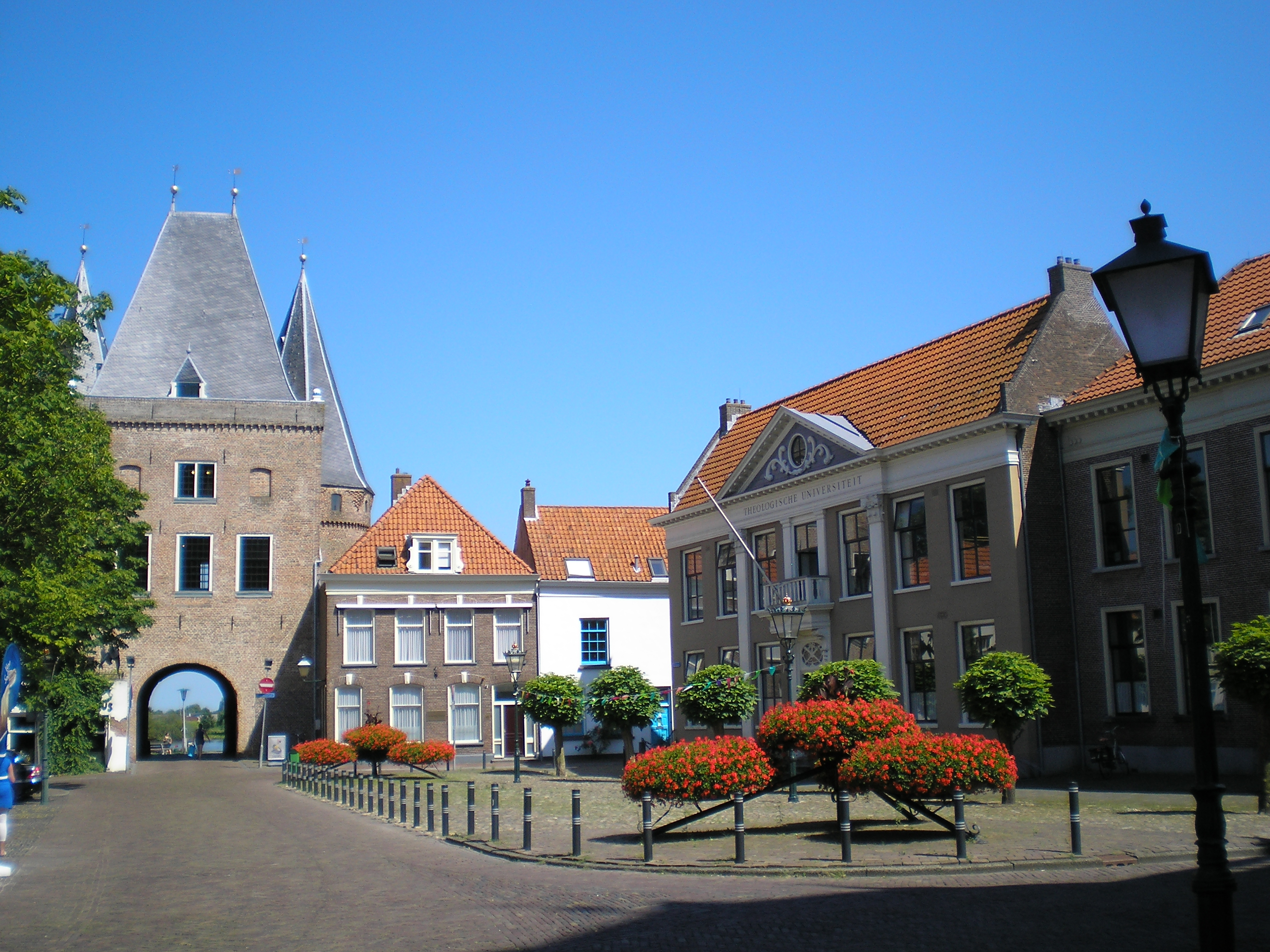
