= Aalt Mondria =

Dutch criminal and serial killer

- Born: Adrie Mondria; 9 May 1956; Kampen, Overijssel, Netherlands
- Died: Summer 2011 (aged 55); Balkbrug, Netherlands
- Other name: Aalt
- Conviction: Murder
- Penalty: Life imprisonment, commuted to 18 years' imprisonment

Details
- Victims: 4
- Span of crimes: 1978–1997
- Country: Netherlands
- State: Overijssel
- Date apprehended: 7 March 1997

Adrie "Aalt" Mondria (born 9 May 1956 – 2011), named Aalt M. in the media, was a Dutch criminal and serial killer who committed four murders and was responsible for a large number of assaults. Mondria was considered extremely violent and aggressive. After a notorious murder of his girlfriend's 10-year-old son, he was sentenced to 18 years imprisonment in 1998, after initially receiving life imprisonment for three murders in 1978, for which he also received 15 years imprisonment.

== Biography ==
Aalt Mondria was born in Kampen, Overijssel and grew up in Vollenhove, and started his criminal career during his puberty. In 1976, the addicted and paranoid Mondria was convicted for the first time after threatening another criminal, receiving four months imprisonment in a treatment clinic. He proved to be an unmanageable patient, smashing everything around the place before eventually escaping.

=== Triple murder in Hoeven ===
In 1978, he escaped again from the treatment clinic and he went into hiding at his girlfriend's apartment in Amsterdam. After the pair assaulted the landlady—who became permanently paralyzed—Mondria and his lover fled to North Brabant. On 30 July 1978, they entered a house in the town of Hoeven. The residents, the elderly couple Rijnvos and their 38-year-old daughter were murdered by Mondria. After the pair were arrested, it was revealed that the motive for the crime was robbery, with the spoils being less than 10 guilders.

For the threefold murder, Mondria was sentenced to 15 years' imprisonment. It later turned out that he couldn't be properly treated because of his mental disorder in prison, and so he was transferred to the Van Mesdag Clinic in Groningen. He twice took hostage a social worker in the clinic by force. From the treatment centre, he sought contact with crime reporter Peter R. de Vries, to whom he sent a manuscript about his life, entitled "Entrusted to the Devil". In 1998, Mondria was allowed a trial leave. During said leave, he was arrested again after he shot three men with a semi-automatic firearm in a café in Zwolle, with whom he had just recently gotten into a fight.

=== Murder of a 10-year-old boy ===
After Mondria placed a personal ad in 1995, he got into a relationship with a 30-year-old woman. He was still at the clinic at the time. In 1996, he was allowed residential leave, and moved in with his lover and her 10-year-old son in Groningen. When he got a message from the probation service that he had to report back to the clinic, he forced his girlfriend and her son to flee with him. While in Zwolle, on 6 March 1997, he murdered the boy. After the woman reported to the police in Amsterdam a day later, an investigation was issued into the "extremely fierce" criminal. Mondria surrendered to the railway police the following day at The Hague, initially confessing to the murder, but then retracted his confession.

=== Lawsuit ===
On 11 September 1997, Aalt Mondria was sentenced to life imprisonment by the court in Zwolle. On appeal, which was served on 3 June 1998, the charge was changed from murder to manslaughter and the sentence was reduced to 18 years' imprisonment. During the trial, Mondria claimed that he was the victim of a conspiracy against him. A lawsuit filed on 30 January 2003, concerning the extension of Mondria's imprisonment, found that his aggression was mainly acted out in the isolation cell. He would suffer from serious delusions and was suspicious of everything. During a renewed request in 2001, Mondria dropped his pants in court to show the alleged holes from injections on his body. According to an expert from the Veldzicht clinic in Balkbrug, where Mondria was imprisoned, he was probably untreatable and would therefore unlikely to be released ever again. In February 2007, his sentence was extended for the fourth time by two years.

De Stentor reported that on 28 September 2011, Mondria had been dead since the summer, resulting from an untreated Hepatitis C.

== See also ==
- List of serial killers by country
