= Barent Avercamp =

Dutch painter

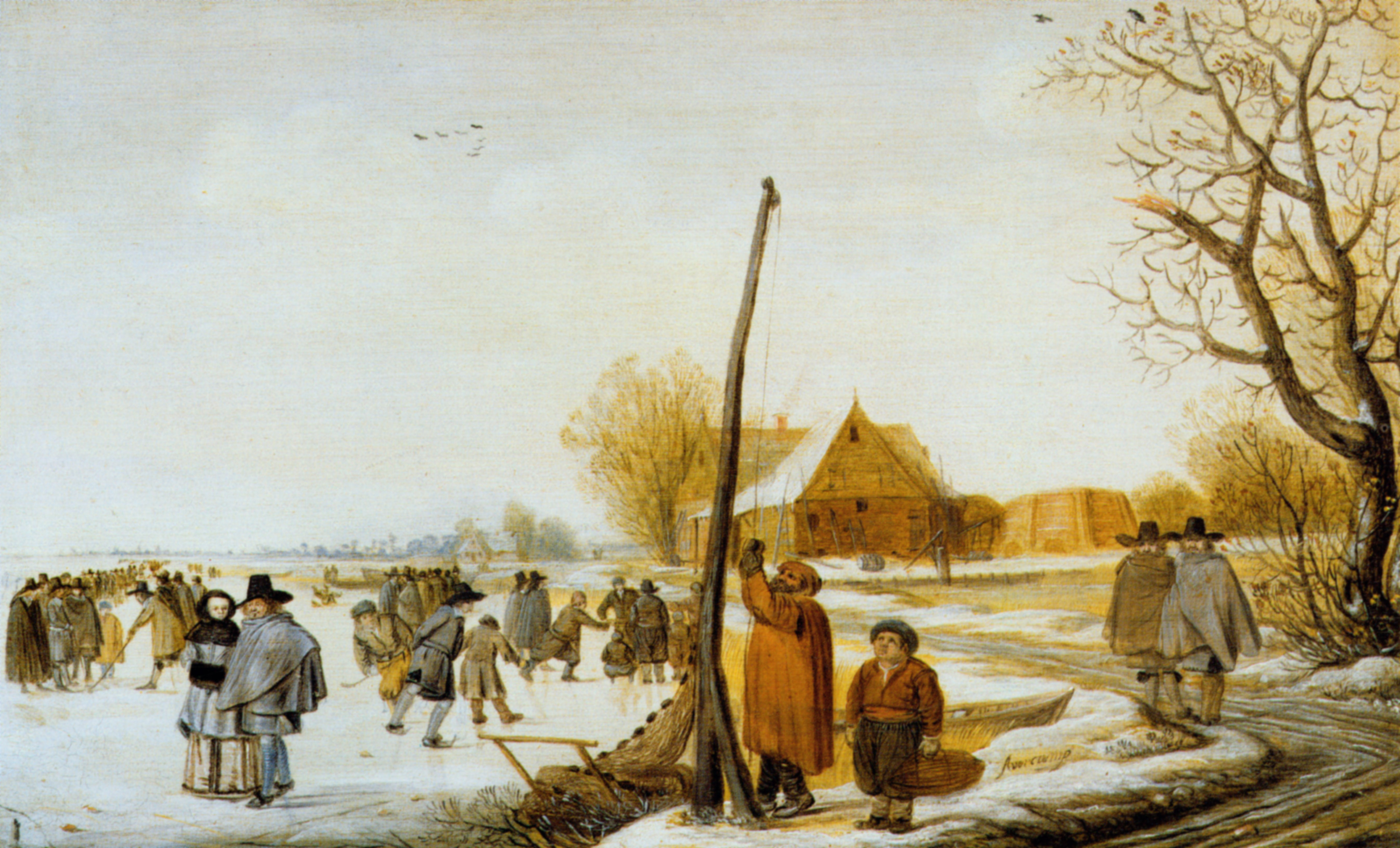
Barent Avercamp, Winter Landscape Frozen Over River, Gemäldegalerie, Berlin

Barent Avercamp (1612 – October 1679) was a Dutch painter.

Avercamp was born in Kampen and was taught by his uncle Hendrick Avercamp, who was also a painter. Barent primarily painted scenes depicting Netherlands in winter. He was a member of the Guild of Saint Luke, and traveled around the Netherlands including Zwolle and Zutphen for his settings and inspiration.
