= Kampen City Hall =

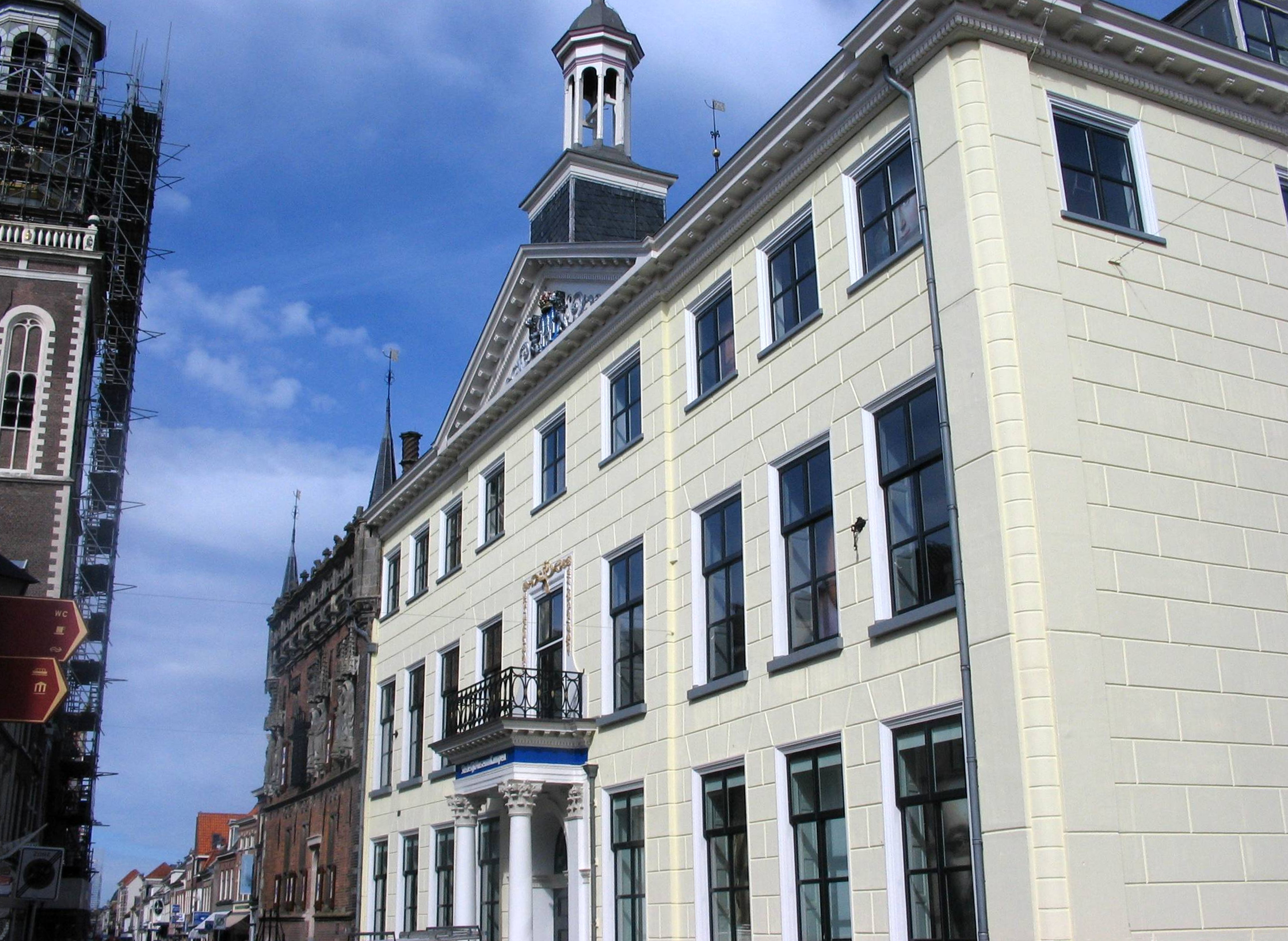
- City Hall with older building in the background, today a museum
- Interactive map of the Kampen City Hall area
- Alternative names: Stadhuis van Kampen

General information
- Type: Seat of local government
- Architectural style: neo-classical
- Location: Kampen, Overijssel, Oudestraat 133
- Coordinates: 52°33′31.88″N 5°54′59.9″E
- Completed: 1835
- Owner: Gemeente Museum Kampen

The City Hall, Kampen is an old city hall in Kampen, Overijssel. Both the older, Gothic portion and the newer, neo-classical building for the government offices form a Rijksmonument complex. It is used for weddings and other official proceedings. The older portion is in use as the local museum of Kampen.

== History ==
Precise dates for the old part of the building are not available, but various decorations can be dated, most notably the fireplace in the sheriffs’ courtroom, which was made between 1543 and 1554 by the sculptor Jacob de Nole. He was from the Southern Netherlands but moved to Utrecht from 1530 onwards.

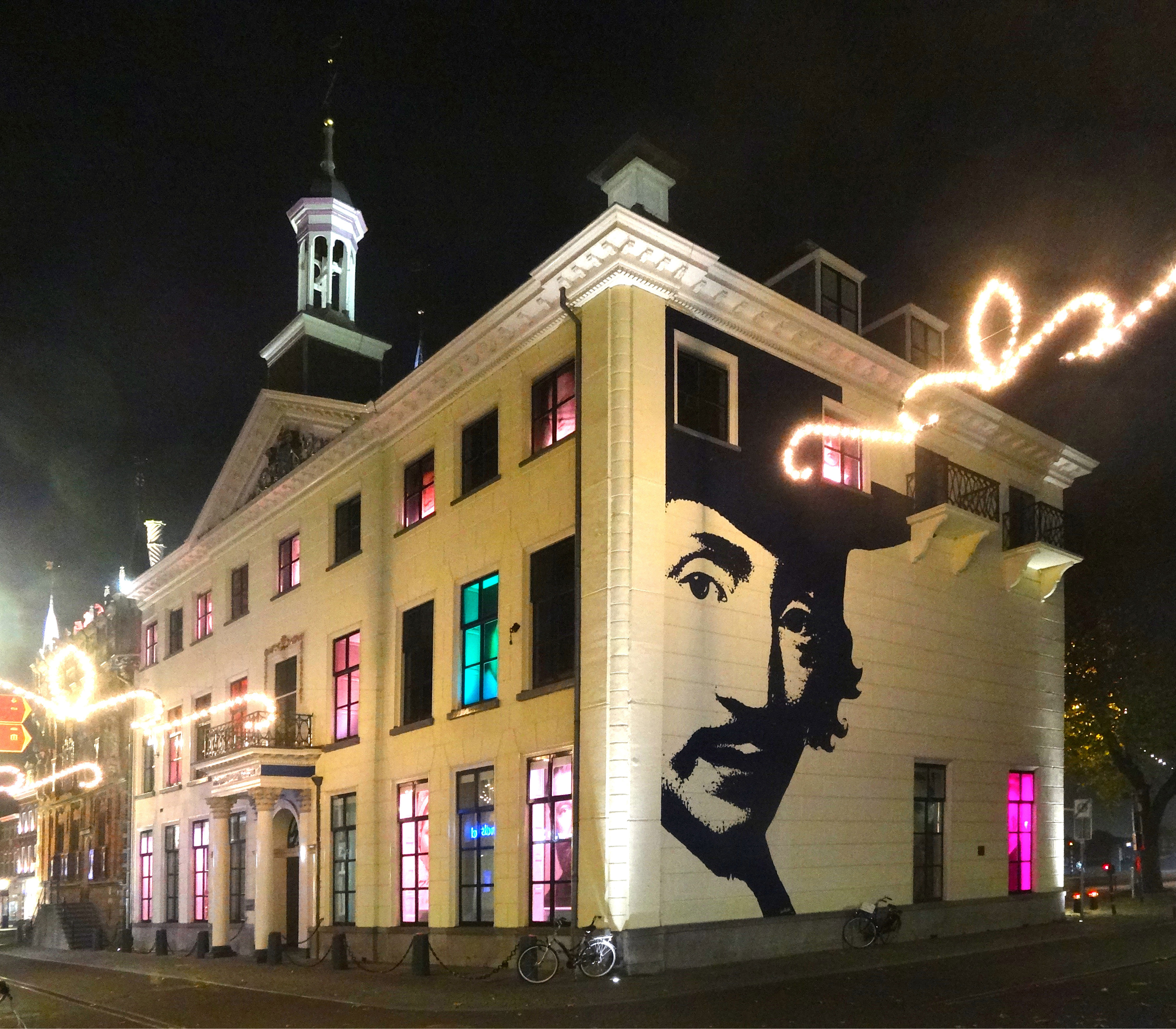
City hall by night

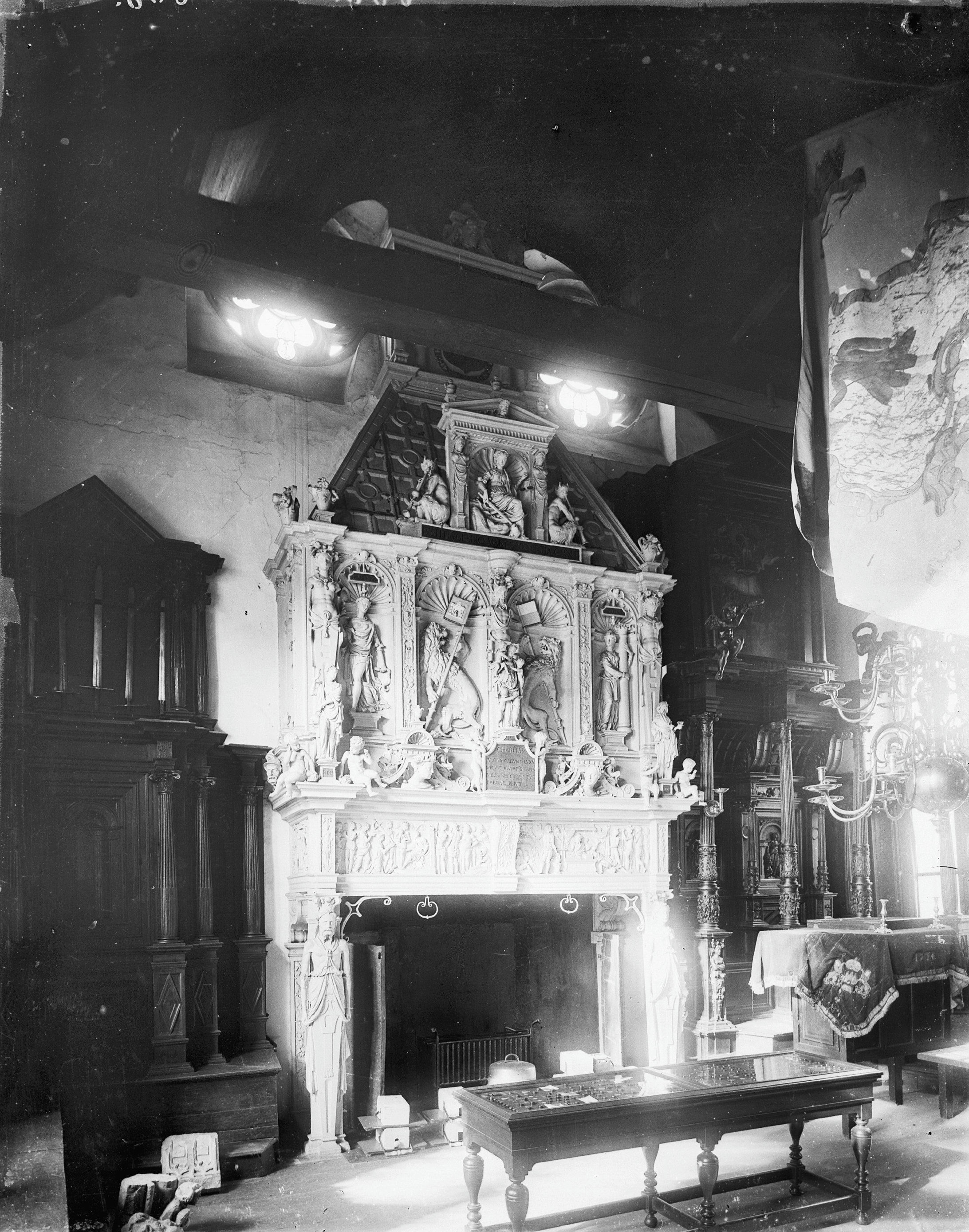
17th-century chimneypiece in the old city hall

By the 19th century, the city hall had become cramped and a new neo-classical addition was built on the end. For this the old renaissance gate needed to be deconstructed and the painter Cornelis Springer captured it in a nostalgic painting in 1832:

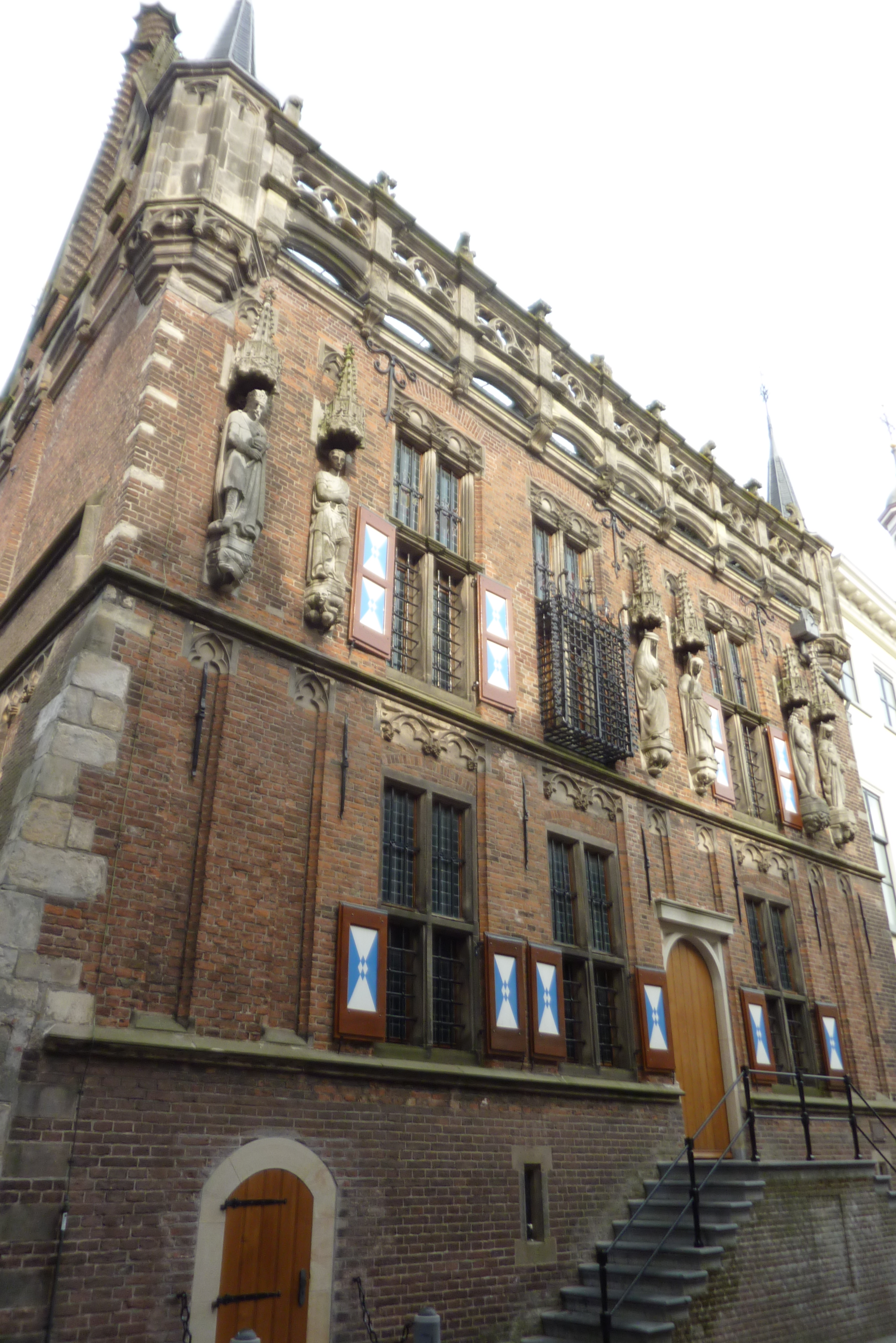
Gothic entrance reinstated

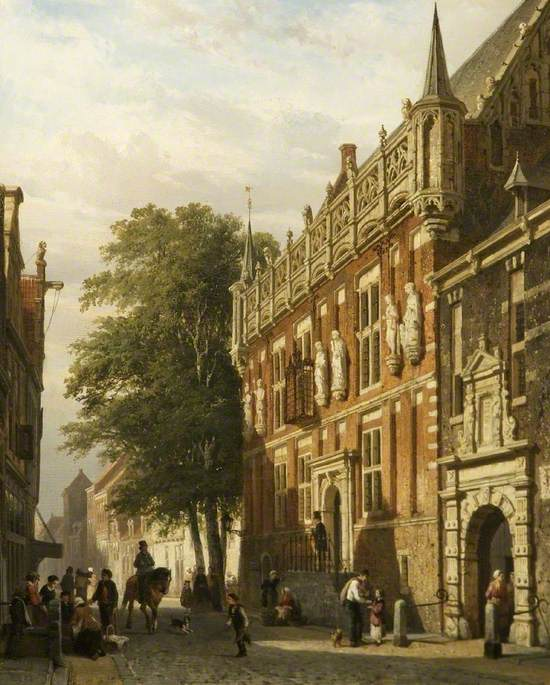
City Hall, Kampen in 1832 by Springer

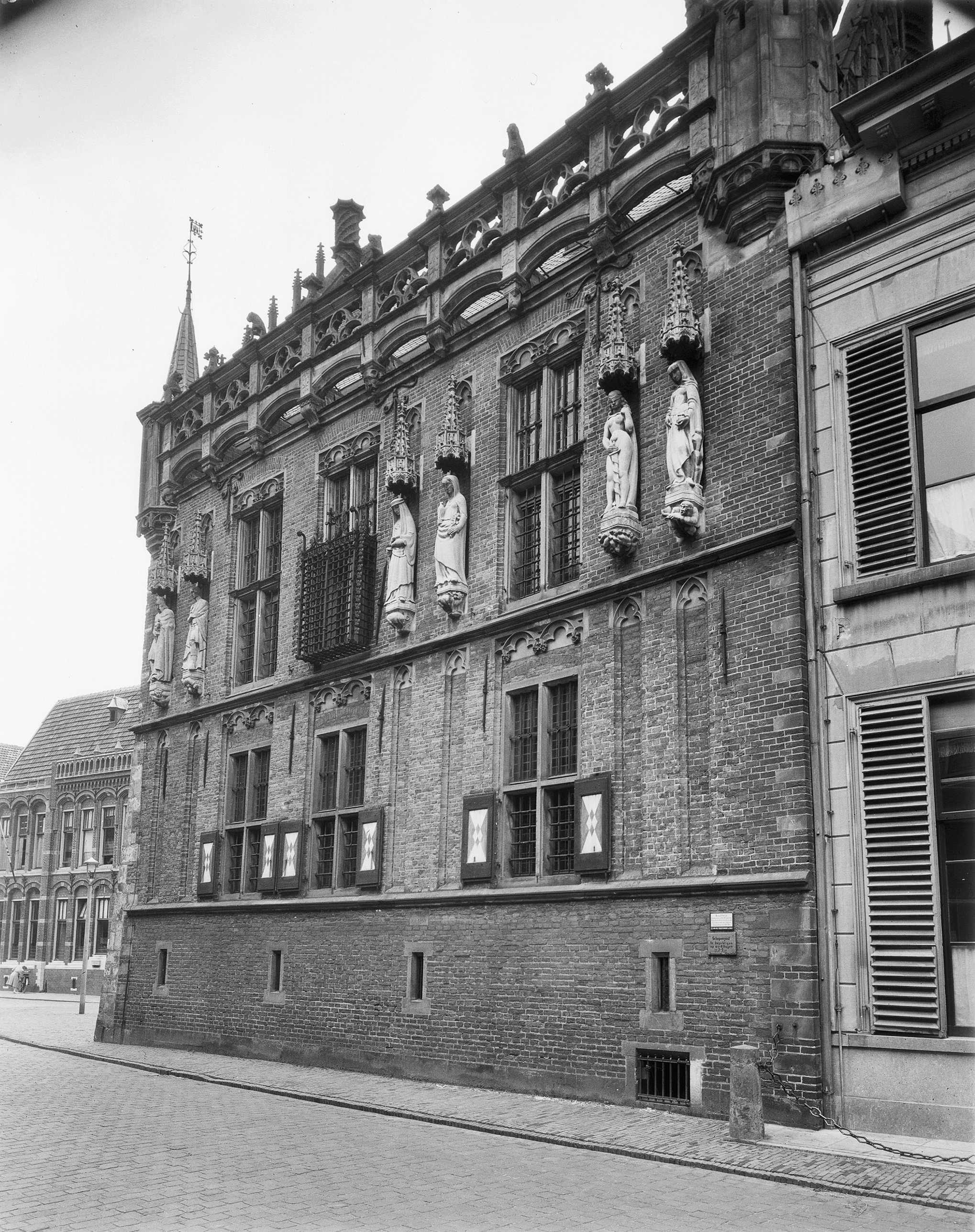
Same view in 1950, Gothic entrance bricked up
