= Provincial road N479 (Netherlands) =

Highway in the Netherlands

Provincial highway 479
- Provinciale weg 479
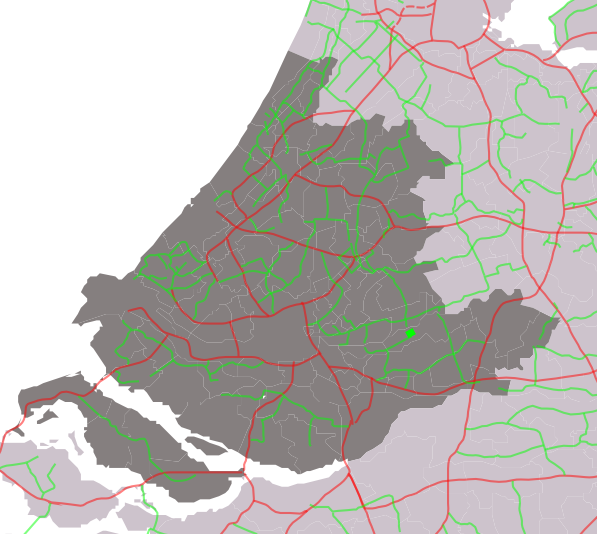

Major junctions
- South end: Streefkerk
- North end: Bergambacht

Location
- Country: Kingdom of the Netherlands
- Constituent country: Netherlands
- Provinces: South Holland

Highway system
- Roads in the Netherlands; Motorways; E-roads; Provincial; City routes

Provincial road N479 is a Dutch provincial road in the province South Holland. It connects the N480 at Streefkerk with the ferry across the Lek river to Bergstoep.
