= Provincial road N482 (Netherlands) =

Dutch provincial road

Provincial highway 482
- Provinciale weg 482

Route information
- Length: 3.1 km (1.9 mi)

Major junctions
- North end: Bleskensgraaf
- South end: Sliedrecht

Location
- Country: Kingdom of the Netherlands
- Constituent country: Netherlands
- Provinces: South Holland

Highway system
- Roads in the Netherlands; Motorways; E-roads; Provincial; City routes

Provincial road N482 is a Dutch provincial road in the province South Holland. It connects with the N214 south of Bleskensgraaf and runs to Sliedrecht.
