= Provincial road N335 (Netherlands) =

Road in the Netherlands

Provincial highway 335
- Provinciale weg 335
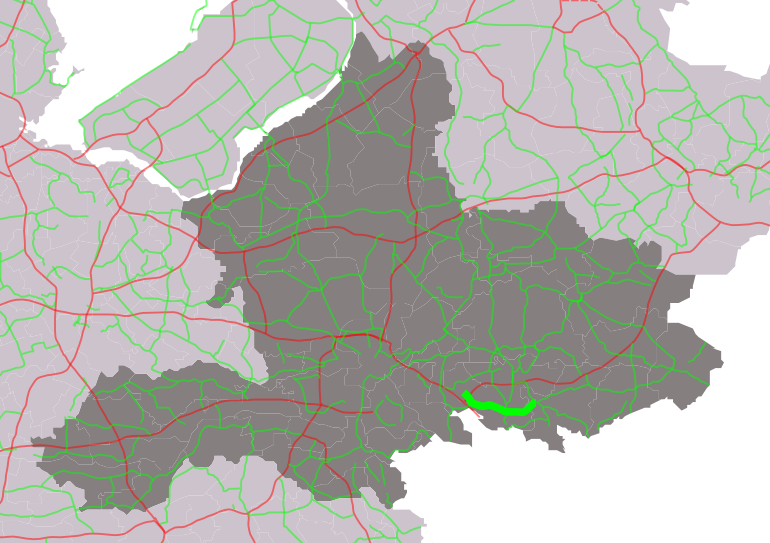

Major junctions
- West end: A 18 – Didam
- East end: N 317 – Etten (Netherlands)

Location
- Country: Kingdom of the Netherlands
- Constituent country: Netherlands
- Provinces: Gelderland

Highway system
- Roads in the Netherlands; Motorways; E-roads; Provincial; City routes

Provincial road N335 is a Dutch provincial road in Gelderland. It connects with the A18 at Nieuw-Dijk and runs past Beek, Zeddam, Vinkwijk, Klein Azewijn and Ziek to Etten.
