= Provincial road N481 (Netherlands) =

Highway in the Netherlands

Provincial highway 481
- Provinciale weg 481
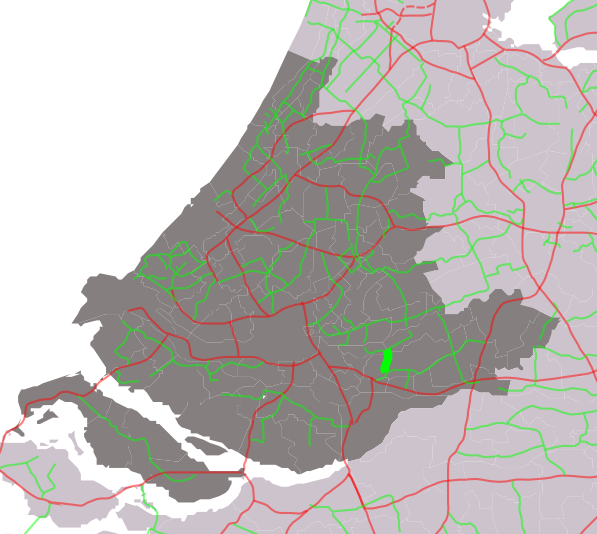

Route information
- Length: 4.2 km (2.6 mi)

Major junctions
- South end: Oud-Alblas
- North end: Streefkerk

Location
- Country: Kingdom of the Netherlands
- Constituent country: Netherlands
- Provinces: South Holland

Highway system
- Roads in the Netherlands; Motorways; E-roads; Provincial; City routes

Provincial road N481 is a Dutch provincial road in the province South Holland.
