= Provincial road N480 (Netherlands) =

Highway in the Netherlands

Provincial highway 480
- Provinciale weg 480
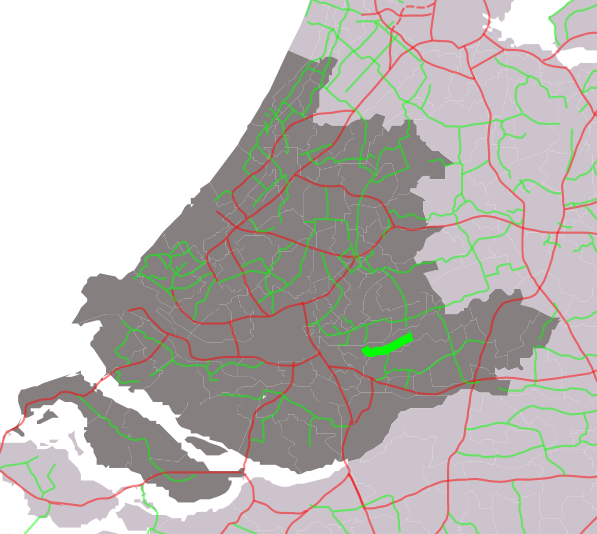

Route information
- Length: 8.8 km (5.5 mi)

Major junctions
- West end: Nieuw-Lekkerland
- East end: Streefkerk

Location
- Country: Kingdom of the Netherlands
- Constituent country: Netherlands
- Provinces: South Holland

Highway system
- Roads in the Netherlands; Motorways; E-roads; Provincial; City routes

Provincial road N480 is a Dutch provincial road in the province South Holland.
