= List of provincial roads in the Netherlands =

Provincial roads are roads maintained by one or more of the 12 provinces of the Netherlands.

There are main roads, which run in multiple provinces, and province specific provincial roads.

== Main provincial roads ==
Number	Length (km)	Length (mi)	Southern or western terminus	Northern or eastern terminus	Formed	Removed	Notes
N 2	18	11	—	—	—	—	Exists in two parallel sections to the A2 in Maastricht and Eindhoven
N 3	10	6.2	Papendrecht	Dordrecht	—	—	Only remaining section of unbuilt A3
N 7	5	3.1	Folsgare	Sneek	—	—	Portion of Sneek Ring
N 7	5	3.1	Groningen	Euvelgunne	—	—	Portion of Groningen Ring
N 8	9	5.6	A8 at Zaanstad-Noord interchange	A9 at Uitgeest interchange	—	—	Portion of A8; overlaps N246 and N203 due to the missing link of the A8
N 9	41	25	A9/N242 in Alkmaar	N250/N99 in Den Helder	—	—	Continuation of A9
N 11	21	13	A4 near Leiden	A12 near Bodegraven	—	—	Originally planned as A11
N 14	5	3.1	Duindigt	A4 at Leidschendam interchange	—	—	Originally planned as A14; portion of The Hague Ring
N 15	19	12	Maasvlakte	A15 at Oostvoorne interchange	—	—	
N 18	45	28	A18 in Varsseveld	A35 in Enschede	—	—	Officially a portion of A15, numbered as N15 until the late 1980s
N 23	—	—	—	—	proposed	—	3 provinces served: North Holland, Flevoland, Overijssel
N 31	34	21	—	—	—	—	Exists in two sections, connected by the A31
N 32	1	0.62	A32 at Wirdum interchange	N31 at Werpsterhoek interchange	—	—	
N 33	72	45	A28 at Assen interchange	Roundabout at N46 in Eemshaven	—	—	Originally planned as A33; section north of A7 originally ran along current N362 and other routes
N 34	77	48	Roundabout at N36 in Ommen	A28 De Punt	1951	current	
N 35	41	25	—	—	—	—	Exists in two sections, connected by the A35
N 36	35	22	A35 at Almelo-West interchange, Wierden	Roundabout at N48 in Ommen	—	—	
N 44	—	—	Wassenaar	S 101 in The Hague	—	—	Portion of A44
N 46	35	22	Euvelgunne interchange, Groningen	N33 in Eemshaven	—	—	
N 48	22	14	N348/N340 in Ommen	N33 in Eemshaven	—	—	
N 50	22	14	A50 at Hattemerbroek interchange	A6 at Emmeloord interchange, Emmeloord	—	—	Originally planned as A38
N 57	77	48	Brielle interchange	Middelburg-Oost interchange, Middelburg	—	—	Portion over the Harlingvlietdam was A57 in the 1970s
N 58	0.5	0.31	A58/N288 in Flushing	Oude-Veerhavenweg in Flushing	—	—	Old route through Zeeuws-Vlaanderen now N676 and N253
N 59	45	28	N57	Hellegatsplein interchange	—	—	Former portion of A18 until the 1980s
N 61	25	16	N62	Roundabout at N253/N676 in Schoonedijke	—	—	
N 62	41	25	A58 near Goes	N423 at the Belgian border	2003	current	Originally planned as A61; was never a national highway
N 65	16	9.9	—	—	—	—	Exists in two sections, connected by the A65; planned to be upgraded to a motorway
N 69	16	9.9	A67 in Veldhoven	N74 at the Belgian border	—	—	Originally planned as the A69, although partially on a different route
N 99	19	12	De Kooy interchange	Den Oever interchange	—	—	Former portion of A9

Number	Length (km)	Length (mi)	Southern or western terminus	Northern or eastern terminus	Formed	Removed	Notes
N 194	16	9.9	A7 in Scharwoude	N242 in Heerhugowaard	2018	current	Formerly N243 and N507
N 195	—	—	N201	N231	proposed	—	Planned southern ring road of Hoofdorp; status unknown
N 196	2.7	1.7	N201 in De Hoek	Aalsmeer	2013	current	Former routing of N201
N 197	7.2	4.5	Roundabout N246 in Beverwijk	Heemskerk	—	—	Portion of route originally planned as A8
N 198	7	4.3	Woerden	N228	—	—	Section between De Meern and Utrecht-Centrum interchange of the A2 was signed as N198 until 2010
N 199	8.7	5.4	N806 in Bunschoten	Roundabout at N221 in Amersfoort	—	—	

Number	Length (km)	Length (mi)	Southern or western terminus	Northern or eastern terminus	Formed	Removed	Notes
N 200	56	35	Zandvoort	Hilversum	—	—	Route through Aalsmeer now N196
N 201	56	35	Zandvoort	Hilversum	—	—	Route through Aalsmeer now N196
N 202	6.8	4.2	IJmuiden	S 102 in Amsterdam	—	—	Was A6 before 1948
N 203	19	12	S 152 in Wormerveer	N513 near Limmen	—	—	Route in Zaanstad now S 152 since mid-2014; route between N246 and A9 is designated as N8 as there is no link to the A8
N 204	—	—	N210 north of Lopik	Woerden	—	—	
N 205	21	13	N208 in Heemstede	N207 near Nieuw-Vennep	—	—	Connecting roads at the Rottepolderplein interchange are designated A205
N 206	42.1	26.2	Zoetermeer	N201 in Aerdenhout	—	—	
N 207	51.7	32.1	N210/N478 in Bergambacht	N208 in Hillegom	—	—	
N 208	—	—	Haarlem	IJmuiden	—	—	Final kilometer before the A22 is designated as A208; was A9 and A8
N 209	26.3	16.3	Hazerswoude-Rijndijk	A13	—	—	
N 210	46	29	Terbregseplein, A16	A2 in Nieuwegein	—	—	
N 211	20.4	12.7	The Hague	Hook of Holland	—	—	
N 212	12.8	8.0	N201 north of Wilnis	N198 east of Woerden	—	—	
N 213	5.9	3.7	A20/N223 near Westerlee	N211/N464 near Poeldijk	—	—	Route originally planned as a variant for A20
N 214	21.4	13.3	N3 near Papendrecht	A27 near Breda	—	—	
N 215	—	—	—	—	—	—	
N 216	—	—	—	—	—	—	
N 217	—	—	—	—	—	—	
N 218	—	—	—	—	—	—	
N 219	—	—	—	—	—	—	
N 220	—	—	—	—	—	—	Former portion of A20
N 221	—	—	—	—	—	—	One section former A1, another section former A28 before 1986
N 222	—	—	—	—	—	—	Route was unbuilt A54
N 223	—	—	—	—	—	—	
N 224	—	—	—	—	—	—	Was A24 before 1948
N 225	—	—	—	—	—	—	Was A25 before 1958
N 226	—	—	—	—	—	—	
N 227	—	—	—	—	—	—	
N 228	—	—	—	—	—	—	
N 229	—	—	—	—	—	—	
N 230	—	—	—	—	—	—	
N 231	—	—	—	—	—	—	
N 232	—	—	—	—	—	—	
N 233	—	—	—	—	—	—	
N 234	—	—	—	—	—	—	
N 235	—	—	—	—	—	—	
N 236	—	—	—	—	—	—	
N 237	—	—	—	—	—	—	Former portion of A23
N 238	—	—	—	—	—	—	
N 239	—	—	—	—	—	—	
N 240	—	—	—	—	—	—	
N 241	—	—	—	—	—	—	
N 242	—	—	—	—	—	—	
N 243	—	—	—	—	—	—	
N 244	—	—	—	—	—	—	
N 245	—	—	—	—	—	—	
N 246	—	—	—	—	—	—	
N 247	—	—	—	—	—	—	
N 248	—	—	—	—	—	—	
N 249	—	—	—	—	—	—	
N 250	—	—	—	—	—	—	Was A9 before 1993
N 251	—	—	—	—	—	—	
N 252	—	—	—	—	—	—	
N 253	—	—	—	—	—	—	Was N58 before 2003
N 254	—	—	—	—	—	—	
N 255	—	—	—	—	—	—	
N 256	—	—	—	—	—	—	First 3 km is designated A256
N 257	—	—	—	—	—	—	
N 258	—	—	—	—	—	—	
N 259	—	—	A4 at Dinteloord interchange	A4 at Tholen interchange	—	2014	Served as a link before the A4 was completed between Rotterdam and Antwerp; replaced by the A4
N 260	—	—	—	—	—	—	
N 261	—	—	—	—	—	—	
N 262	—	—	—	—	—	—	
N 263	—	—	—	—	—	—	
N 264	—	—	—	—	—	—	
N 265	—	—	John F. Kennedylaan, Eindhoven	A50 at Oss-Oost interchange, Oss	—	—	Replaced by the A50
N 266	—	—	—	—	—	—	
N 267	—	—	—	—	—	—	
N 268	—	—	—	—	—	—	
N 269	—	—	—	—	—	—	
N 270	—	—	—	—	—	—	
N 271	—	—	—	—	—	—	No longer a national highway due to the A73
N 272	—	—	—	—	—	—	
N 273	—	—	N78 at the Belgian border	A73 at Maasbree interchange, Blerick	—	—	Section from Blerick to Venray now A73; no longer a national highway due to the A73
N 274	—	—	N299 in Brunssum	N293 in Posterholt	—	—	Gap in route through Germany, numbered as L 410
N 275	—	—	—	—	—	—	
N 276	—	—	—	—	—	—	
N 277	—	—	—	—	—	—	
N 278	30	19	N79 at Belgian border	B1 at German border	—	—	Originally planned as A78
N 279	—	—	—	—	—	—	
N 280	—	—	—	—	—	—	Formerly N/A68
N 281	—	—	—	—	—	—	Former portion of A76
N 282	—	—	—	—	—	—	Former portion of A63
N 283	—	—	—	—	—	—	
N 284	—	—	—	—	—	—	
N 285	—	—	—	—	—	—	
N 286	—	—	—	—	—	—	
N 287	—	—	—	—	—	—	
N 288	—	—	—	—	—	—	
N 289	—	—	—	—	—	—	
N 290	—	—	—	—	—	—	
N 291	—	—	—	—	—	—	
N 292	—	—	—	—	—	—	
N 293	—	—	—	—	—	—	
N 294	—	—	—	—	—	—	
N 295	—	—	—	—	—	—	
N 296	—	—	—	—	—	—	
N 297	—	—	—	—	—	—	
N 298	—	—	—	—	—	—	
N 299	—	—	—	—	—	—	

Number	Length (km)	Length (mi)	Southern or western terminus	Northern or eastern terminus	Formed	Removed	Notes
N 300	—	—	—	—	—	—	
N 301	—	—	—	—	—	—	
N 302	—	—	—	—	—	—	
N 303	—	—	—	—	—	—	
N 304	—	—	—	—	—	—	
N 305	—	—	—	—	—	—	
N 306	—	—	—	—	—	—	
N 307	—	—	—	—	—	—	
N 308	—	—	—	—	—	—	
N 309	—	—	—	—	—	—	
N 310	—	—	—	—	—	—	
N 311	—	—	—	—	—	—	
N 312	—	—	—	—	—	—	
N 313	—	—	—	—	—	—	
N 314	—	—	—	—	—	—	
N 315	—	—	—	—	—	—	
N 316	—	—	—	—	—	—	
N 317	—	—	—	—	—	—	
N 318	—	—	—	—	—	—	
N 319	—	—	—	—	—	—	
N 320	—	—	—	—	—	—	
N 321	—	—	—	—	—	—	
N 322	—	—	—	—	—	—	
N 323	—	—	—	—	—	—	
N 324	—	—	—	—	—	—	
N 325	28	17	A12	German border near Beek	—	—	Section between Arnhem and Nijmegen is A325
N 326	—	—	S 103 in Nijmegen	A326 at Parkerplein roundabout near Wijchen	—	—	
N 327	—	—	—	—	—	—	
N 329	—	—	—	—	—	—	
N 330	—	—	—	—	—	—	
N 331	44	27	A6/N337 in Zwolle	A6/N351 in Emmeloord	—	—	
N 332	—	—	—	—	—	—	
N 333	—	—	—	—	—	—	
N 334	—	—	—	—	—	—	
N 335	—	—	—	—	—	—	
N 336	—	—	—	—	—	—	
N 337	—	—	—	—	—	—	
N 338	—	—	—	—	—	—	
N 339	—	—	—	—	—	—	
N 340	—	—	—	—	—	—	
N 341	—	—	—	—	—	—	
N 342	—	—	—	—	—	—	
N 343	—	—	—	—	—	—	
N 344	—	—	—	—	—	—	
N 345	—	—	—	—	—	—	
N 346	—	—	—	—	—	—	
N 347	—	—	—	—	—	—	
N 348	—	—	—	—	—	—	
N 349	—	—	—	—	—	—	
N 350	—	—	—	—	—	—	
N 351	—	—	—	—	—	—	
N 352	—	—	—	—	—	—	
N 353	—	—	—	—	—	—	
N 354	—	—	—	—	—	—	
N 355	—	—	—	—	—	—	
N 356	—	—	—	—	—	—	
N 357	—	—	—	—	—	—	
N 358	—	—	—	—	—	—	
N 359	—	—	—	—	—	—	
N 360	—	—	—	—	—	—	
N 361	—	—	—	—	—	—	
N 362	—	—	—	—	—	—	
N 363	—	—	—	—	—	—	
N 364	—	—	—	—	—	2012	Returned to municipalities as a local route
N 365	—	—	—	—	—	—	
N 366	—	—	—	—	—	—	
N 367	—	—	—	—	—	—	
N 368	—	—	—	—	—	—	
N 369	—	—	—	—	—	—	
N 370	—	—	—	—	—	—	
N 371	—	—	—	—	—	—	
N 372	—	—	—	—	—	—	
N 373	—	—	—	—	—	—	
N 374	—	—	—	—	—	—	
N 375	—	—	—	—	—	—	
N 376	—	—	—	—	—	—	
N 377	—	—	—	—	—	—	
N 378	—	—	—	—	—	—	
N 379	—	—	—	—	—	—	
N 380	—	—	—	—	—	—	
N 381	—	—	—	—	—	—	
N 382	—	—	—	—	—	—	
N 383	—	—	—	—	—	—	
N 384	—	—	—	—	—	—	
N 385	—	—	—	—	—	—	
N 386	—	—	—	—	—	—	
N 387	—	—	—	—	—	—	
N 388	—	—	—	—	—	—	
N 389	—	—	—	—	—	—	
N 390	—	—	—	—	—	—	
N 391	—	—	—	—	—	—	
N 392	—	—	—	—	—	—	
N 393	—	—	—	—	—	—	
N 394	—	—	—	—	—	—	Formerly numbered N637
N 395	—	—	—	—	—	—	Formerly numbered N621
N 396	—	—	—	—	—	—	Former portion of N634
N 397	—	—	—	—	—	—	
N 398	—	—	—	—	—	—	

Number	Length (km)	Length (mi)	Southern or western terminus	Northern or eastern terminus	Formed	Removed	Notes
N 401	—	—	—	—	—	—	
N 402	—	—	—	—	—	—	
N 403	—	—	—	—	—	—	
N 404	—	—	—	—	—	2006	Downgraded to local route
N 405	—	—	—	—	—	—	
N 406	—	—	—	—	—	—	
N 407	—	—	—	—	—	2004	Downgraded to local route
N 408	—	—	—	—	—	—	
N 409	—	—	—	—	—	—	
N 410	—	—	—	—	—	—	
N 411	—	—	—	—	—	—	
N 412	—	—	—	—	—	—	
N 413	—	—	—	—	—	—	
N 414	—	—	—	—	—	—	
N 415	—	—	—	—	—	—	
N 416	—	—	—	—	—	—	
N 417	—	—	—	—	—	—	
N 418	—	—	—	—	—	2019	Downgraded to local route
N 419	—	—	—	—	—	—	
N 420	—	—	—	—	—	—	
N 421	—	—	—	—	—	—	
N 434	—	—	—	—	—	—	
N 439	—	—	—	—	—	—	Downgraded to local route
N 440	—	—	—	—	—	—	Unsigned
N 441	—	—	—	—	—	—	
N 442	—	—	—	—	—	—	
N 443	—	—	—	—	—	—	
N 444	—	—	—	—	—	—	
N 445	—	—	—	—	—	—	
N 446	—	—	—	—	—	—	
N 447	—	—	—	—	—	—	
N 448	—	—	—	—	—	2019	Downgraded to local route
N 449	—	—	—	—	—	—	
N 450	—	—	—	—	—	—	
N 451	—	—	—	—	—	—	
N 452	—	—	—	—	—	—	
N 453	—	—	—	—	—	—	
N 454	—	—	—	—	—	—	
N 455	—	—	—	—	—	—	
N 456	—	—	—	—	—	—	
N 457	—	—	—	—	—	—	
N 458	—	—	—	—	—	—	
N 459	—	—	—	—	—	—	
N 460	—	—	—	—	—	—	
N 461	—	—	—	—	—	—	
N 462	—	—	—	—	—	—	
N 463	—	—	—	—	—	—	
N 464	—	—	—	—	—	—	
N 465	—	—	—	—	—	2011	Downgraded to local route
N 466	—	—	—	—	—	—	
N 467	—	—	—	—	—	—	
N 468	—	—	—	—	—	—	
N 469	—	—	—	—	—	—	Downgraded to local route
N 470	—	—	—	—	—	—	
N 471	—	—	—	—	—	—	
N 472	—	—	—	—	—	—	
N 473	—	—	—	—	—	—	
N 474	—	—	—	—	—	—	
N 475	—	—	—	—	—	—	
N 476	—	—	—	—	—	—	
N 477	—	—	—	—	—	—	
N 478	—	—	—	—	—	—	
N 479	—	—	—	—	—	—	
N 480	—	—	—	—	—	—	
N 481	—	—	—	—	—	—	
N 482	—	—	—	—	—	—	
N 483	—	—	A2 at Everdingen interchange	A2 at Everdingen interchange	—	—	Now an access ramp to Utrecht from the A2
N 484	—	—	—	—	—	—	
N 487	—	—	—	—	—	—	
N 488	—	—	—	—	—	—	
N 489	—	—	—	—	—	—	
N 490	—	—	—	—	—	—	Downgraded to local route
N 491	—	—	—	—	—	—	
N 492	—	—	—	—	—	—	
N 493	—	—	—	—	—	—	
N 494	—	—	—	—	—	—	
N 495	—	—	—	—	—	1998	Downgraded to local route
N 496	—	—	—	—	—	—	
N 497	—	—	—	—	—	—	
N 498	—	—	—	—	—	—	

Number	Length (km)	Length (mi)	Southern or western terminus	Northern or eastern terminus	Formed	Removed	Notes
N 501	—	—	—	—	—	—	
N 502	—	—	—	—	—	—	
N 503	—	—	—	—	—	—	
N 504	—	—	—	—	—	—	
N 505	—	—	—	—	—	—	
N 506	—	—	—	—	—	—	
N 507	—	—	—	—	—	2018	Renumbered to N194
N 508	—	—	—	—	—	—	
N 509	—	—	—	—	—	—	
N 510	—	—	—	—	—	—	
N 511	—	—	—	—	—	—	
N 512	—	—	—	—	—	—	
N 513	—	—	—	—	—	—	
N 514	—	—	—	—	—	—	
N 515	—	—	—	—	—	—	
N 516	—	—	—	—	—	—	
N 517	—	—	—	—	—	—	
N 518	—	—	—	—	—	—	
N 519	—	—	—	—	—	—	
N 520	—	—	—	—	—	—	
N 521	—	—	—	—	—	—	
N 522	—	—	—	—	—	—	
N 523	—	—	—	—	—	—	
N 524	—	—	—	—	—	—	
N 525	—	—	—	—	—	—	
N 526	—	—	—	—	—	—	
N 527	—	—	—	—	—	—	
N 551	—	—	—	—	—	—	
N 552	—	—	N271 in Nieuw-Bergen	L361 at German border	—	2008	Downgraded to local route
N 553	—	—	—	—	—	—	
N 554	—	—	—	—	—	—	
N 555	—	—	—	—	—	—	
N 556	—	—	—	—	—	—	
N 560	—	—	—	—	—	—	
N 561	—	—	—	—	—	—	
N 562	—	—	—	—	—	—	
N 563	—	—	—	—	—	—	
N 564	—	—	—	—	—	—	
N 565	—	—	—	—	—	—	
N 566	—	—	—	—	—	—	
N 567	—	—	—	—	—	—	
N 568	—	—	—	—	—	—	
N 570	—	—	—	—	—	—	
N 571	—	—	—	—	—	—	
N 572	—	—	—	—	—	—	
N 573	—	—	—	—	—	—	
N 574	—	—	—	—	—	—	
N 580	—	—	N276 near Doenrade	N274 near Schinveld	—	2008	Downgraded to local route
N 581	—	—	Heerlen	N276 near Doenrade	—	2006	Downgraded to local route
N 582	—	—	Geleen	Amstenrade	—	2006	Downgraded to local route
N 583	—	—	A76 at Spaubeek interchange	Schimmert	—	2007	Downgraded to local route
N 584	—	—	Beek	N298 at Hulsberg	—	2007	Downgraded to local route
N 585	—	—	Beek	Bunde	—	2007	Downgraded to local route
N 586	—	—	—	—	—	—	
N 587	—	—	—	—	—	—	
N 588	—	—	—	—	—	—	
N 589	—	—	—	—	—	—	
N 590	—	—	—	—	—	—	
N 591	—	—	—	—	—	—	
N 592	—	—	—	—	—	—	
N 593	—	—	—	—	—	—	
N 594	—	—	—	—	—	—	
N 595	—	—	—	—	—	—	
N 596	—	—	—	—	—	—	
N 597	—	—	Brunssum	Eygelshoven	—	2008	Downgraded to local route
N 598	—	—	—	—	—	—	
N 599	—	—	—	—	—	—	

Number	Length (km)	Length (mi)	Southern or western terminus	Northern or eastern terminus	Formed	Removed	Notes
N 600	—	—	—	—	—	—	
N 601	5	3.1	A2/A65 at Vught interchange	A59 at Vlijmen	—	—	
N 602	—	—	—	—	—	—	
N 603	—	—	—	—	—	—	Downgraded to local route due to completion of the A50
N 604	—	—	—	—	—	—	
N 605	—	—	—	—	—	—	
N 606	—	—	—	—	—	—	
N 607	—	—	—	—	—	—	
N 608	—	—	—	—	—	—	
N 609	—	—	—	—	—	—	
N 610	—	—	—	—	1993	2007	Downgraded to local route
N 611	—	—	—	—	—	—	
N 612	—	—	—	—	—	—	
N 613	—	—	—	—	—	—	
N 614	—	—	—	—	—	—	
N 615	—	—	—	—	—	—	
N 616	—	—	—	—	—	—	
N 617	—	—	—	—	—	—	
N 618	—	—	—	—	—	—	
N 619	—	—	—	—	—	2007	Downgraded to local route
N 620	—	—	—	—	—	—	
N 621	—	—	—	—	—	—	
N 622	—	—	—	—	—	—	
N 623	—	—	—	—	1993	2007	Downgraded to local route
N 624	—	—	—	—	—	2010	Downgraded to local route
N 625	—	—	—	—	—	—	
N 626	—	—	—	—	—	2005	Downgraded to local route
N 627	—	—	—	—	—	—	
N 628	—	—	—	—	1960	2001	Downgraded to local route
N 629	—	—	—	—	—	—	
N 630	—	—	—	—	—	2009	Downgraded to local route; was A65 from 1932-1982, N261 from 1982-1993 and N283 from 1993-2003
N 631	—	—	—	—	—	—	
N 632	—	—	—	—	—	—	
N 633	—	—	—	—	—	—	
N 634	—	—	—	—	—	2007	Valkenswaard to the A2 renumbered to N396 in 2003, remainder downgraded to local route in 2007
N 635	—	—	—	—	—	—	
N 636	—	—	—	—	—	—	
N 637	—	—	—	—	—	—	
N 638	—	—	—	—	—	—	
N 639	—	—	—	—	—	—	
N 640	—	—	—	—	—	—	
N 641	—	—	—	—	—	—	
N 642	—	—	—	—	—	—	
N 651	—	—	—	—	—	—	
N 652	—	—	—	—	—	—	
N 653	—	—	—	—	—	—	
N 654	—	—	—	—	—	—	
N 655	—	—	—	—	—	—	
N 656	—	—	—	—	—	—	
N 657	—	—	—	—	—	2006	Downgraded to local route
N 658	—	—	—	—	—	—	
N 659	—	—	—	—	—	—	
N 660	—	—	—	—	—	—	
N 661	—	—	—	—	—	—	
N 662	—	—	—	—	—	—	
N 663	—	—	—	—	—	—	
N 664	—	—	—	—	—	—	
N 665	—	—	—	—	—	—	
N 666	—	—	—	—	—	—	
N 667	—	—	—	—	—	—	
N 668	—	—	—	—	—	—	
N 669	—	—	—	—	—	—	
N 670	—	—	—	—	—	—	
N 671	—	—	—	—	—	—	
N 672	—	—	—	—	—	—	
N 673	—	—	—	—	—	—	
N 674	—	—	—	—	—	—	
N 675	—	—	—	—	—	—	
N 676	—	—	—	—	—	—	
N 677	—	—	—	—	—	—	
N 678	—	—	—	—	—	—	
N 679	—	—	—	—	—	—	
N 680	—	—	—	—	—	—	
N 681	—	—	—	—	—	—	
N 682	—	—	—	—	—	—	
N 683	—	—	—	—	—	—	
N 684	—	—	—	—	—	—	
N 685	—	—	—	—	—	—	
N 686	—	—	—	—	—	—	
N 687	—	—	—	—	—	—	
N 688	—	—	—	—	—	—	
N 689	—	—	—	—	—	—	
N 690	—	—	—	—	—	—	
N 691	—	—	—	—	—	—	
N 692	—	—	—	—	—	—	
N 695	—	—	—	—	—	—	

Number	Length (km)	Length (mi)	Southern or western terminus	Northern or eastern terminus	Formed	Removed	Notes
N 701	—	—	—	—	—	—	
N 702	—	—	—	—	—	—	
N 703	—	—	—	—	—	—	
N 704	—	—	—	—	—	—	
N 705	—	—	—	—	—	—	
N 706	—	—	—	—	—	—	
N 707	—	—	—	—	—	—	
N 708	—	—	—	—	—	—	
N 709	—	—	—	—	—	—	
N 710	—	—	—	—	—	—	
N 711	—	—	—	—	—	—	
N 712	—	—	—	—	—	—	
N 713	—	—	—	—	—	—	
N 714	—	—	—	—	—	—	
N 715	—	—	—	—	—	—	
N 716	—	—	—	—	—	—	
N 717	—	—	—	—	—	—	
N 718	—	—	—	—	—	—	
N 719	—	—	—	—	—	—	
N 720	—	—	—	—	—	2022	Former portion of the N307; transferred to municipalities as a local route
N 727	—	—	—	—	—	—	
N 731	—	—	—	—	—	—	
N 732	—	—	—	—	—	—	
N 733	—	—	—	—	—	—	
N 734	—	—	—	—	—	—	
N 735	—	—	—	—	—	—	
N 736	—	—	—	—	—	—	
N 737	—	—	—	—	—	—	
N 738	—	—	—	—	—	—	
N 739	—	—	—	—	—	—	
N 740	—	—	—	—	—	—	
N 741	—	—	—	—	—	—	
N 742	—	—	—	—	—	—	
N 743	—	—	—	—	—	—	
N 744	—	—	—	—	—	—	
N 745	—	—	—	—	—	—	
N 746	—	—	—	—	—	—	
N 747	—	—	—	—	—	—	
N 748	—	—	—	—	—	—	
N 749	—	—	—	—	—	—	
N 750	—	—	—	—	—	—	
N 751	—	—	—	—	—	—	
N 752	—	—	—	—	—	—	
N 753	—	—	—	—	—	—	
N 754	—	—	—	—	—	—	
N 755	—	—	—	—	—	—	
N 756	—	—	—	—	—	—	
N 757	—	—	—	—	—	—	
N 758	—	—	—	—	—	—	
N 759	—	—	—	—	—	—	
N 760	—	—	—	—	—	—	
N 761	—	—	—	—	—	—	
N 762	—	—	—	—	—	—	
N 763	—	—	—	—	—	—	
N 764	—	—	—	—	—	—	
N 765	—	—	—	—	—	—	
N 766	—	—	—	—	—	—	
N 768	—	—	—	—	—	—	
N 781	—	—	—	—	—	—	
N 782	—	—	—	—	—	—	
N 783	—	—	—	—	—	—	
N 784	—	—	—	—	—	—	
N 785	—	—	—	—	—	—	
N 786	—	—	—	—	—	—	
N 787	—	—	—	—	—	—	
N 788	—	—	—	—	—	—	
N 789	—	—	—	—	—	—	
N 790	—	—	—	—	—	—	
N 791	—	—	—	—	—	—	
N 792	—	—	—	—	—	—	
N 794	—	—	—	—	—	—	
N 795	—	—	—	—	—	—	
N 796	—	—	—	—	—	—	
N 797	—	—	—	—	—	—	
N 798	—	—	—	—	—	—	

Number	Length (km)	Length (mi)	Southern or western terminus	Northern or eastern terminus	Formed	Removed	Notes
N 800	—	—	—	—	—	—	
N 801	—	—	—	—	—	—	
N 802	—	—	—	—	—	—	
N 803	—	—	—	—	—	2011	Downgraded to local route
N 804	—	—	—	—	—	—	
N 805	—	—	—	—	—	2011	Downgraded to local route
N 806	2	1.2	N199	Nijkerk	—	—	Portion in Nijkerk downgraded to local route
N 810	—	—	—	—	—	—	
N 811	—	—	—	—	—	—	
N 812	—	—	—	—	—	—	
N 813	—	—	—	—	—	—	
N 814	—	—	—	—	—	—	
N 815	—	—	—	—	—	—	
N 816	—	—	—	—	—	—	
N 817	—	—	—	—	—	—	
N 818	—	—	—	—	—	—	
N 819	—	—	—	—	—	—	
N 820	—	—	—	—	—	—	
N 821	—	—	—	—	—	—	
N 822	—	—	—	—	—	—	
N 823	—	—	—	—	—	—	
N 824	—	—	—	—	—	—	
N 825	—	—	—	—	—	—	
N 826	—	—	—	—	—	—	
N 830	—	—	—	—	—	—	
N 831	—	—	—	—	—	—	
N 832	—	—	—	—	—	—	
N 833	—	—	—	—	—	—	
N 834	—	—	—	—	—	—	
N 835	—	—	—	—	—	—	
N 836	—	—	—	—	—	—	
N 837	—	—	—	—	—	—	
N 838	—	—	—	—	—	—	
N 839	—	—	—	—	—	—	
N 840	—	—	—	—	—	—	
N 841	—	—	—	—	—	—	
N 842	—	—	—	—	—	—	
N 843	—	—	—	—	—	—	
N 844	—	—	—	—	—	—	
N 845	—	—	—	—	—	—	
N 846	—	—	—	—	—	—	
N 847	—	—	—	—	—	—	
N 848	—	—	—	—	—	—	
N 851	—	—	—	—	—	—	
N 852	—	—	—	—	—	—	
N 853	—	—	—	—	—	—	
N 854	—	—	—	—	—	—	
N 855	—	—	—	—	—	—	
N 856	—	—	—	—	—	—	
N 857	—	—	—	—	—	—	
N 858	—	—	—	—	—	—	
N 860	—	—	—	—	—	—	
N 861	—	—	—	—	—	—	
N 862	—	—	—	—	—	—	
N 863	—	—	—	—	—	—	
N 865	—	—	—	—	—	—	

Number	Length (km)	Length (mi)	Southern or western terminus	Northern or eastern terminus	Formed	Removed	Notes
N 910	—	—	—	—	—	—	
N 913	—	—	—	—	—	—	
N 915	—	—	—	—	—	—	
N 917	—	—	—	—	—	—	
N 918	—	—	—	—	—	—	
N 919	—	—	—	—	—	—	
N 924	—	—	—	—	—	—	
N 927	—	—	—	—	—	—	
N 928	—	—	—	—	—	—	
N 951	—	—	—	—	—	—	
N 956	—	—	—	—	—	—	
N 959	—	—	—	—	—	—	
N 960	—	—	—	—	—	—	
N 961	—	—	—	—	—	—	
N 962	—	—	—	—	—	—	
N 963	—	—	—	—	—	—	
N 964	—	—	—	—	—	—	
N 965	—	—	—	—	—	—	
N 966	—	—	—	—	—	—	
N 967	—	—	—	—	—	—	
N 968	—	—	—	—	—	—	
N 969	—	—	—	—	—	—	
N 970	—	—	—	—	—	—	
N 971	—	—	—	—	—	—	
N 972	—	—	—	—	—	—	
N 973	—	—	—	—	—	—	
N 974	—	—	—	—	—	—	
N 975	—	—	—	—	—	—	
N 976	—	—	—	—	—	—	
N 977	—	—	—	—	—	—	
N 978	—	—	—	—	—	—	
N 979	—	—	—	—	—	—	
N 980	—	—	—	—	—	—	
N 981	—	—	—	—	—	—	
N 982	—	—	—	—	—	—	
N 983	—	—	—	—	—	—	
N 984	—	—	—	—	—	—	
N 985	—	—	—	—	—	—	
N 986	—	—	—	—	—	—	
N 987	—	—	—	—	—	—	
N 988	—	—	—	—	—	—	
N 989	—	—	—	—	—	—	
N 990	—	—	—	—	—	—	
N 991	—	—	—	—	—	—	
N 992	—	—	—	—	—	—	
N 993	—	—	—	—	—	—	
N 994	—	—	—	—	—	—	
N 995	—	—	—	—	—	—	
N 996	—	—	—	—	—	—	
N 997	—	—	—	—	—	—	
N 998	—	—	—	—	—	—	
N 999	—	—	—	—	—	—	
