= Ellewoutsdijk =

- Village
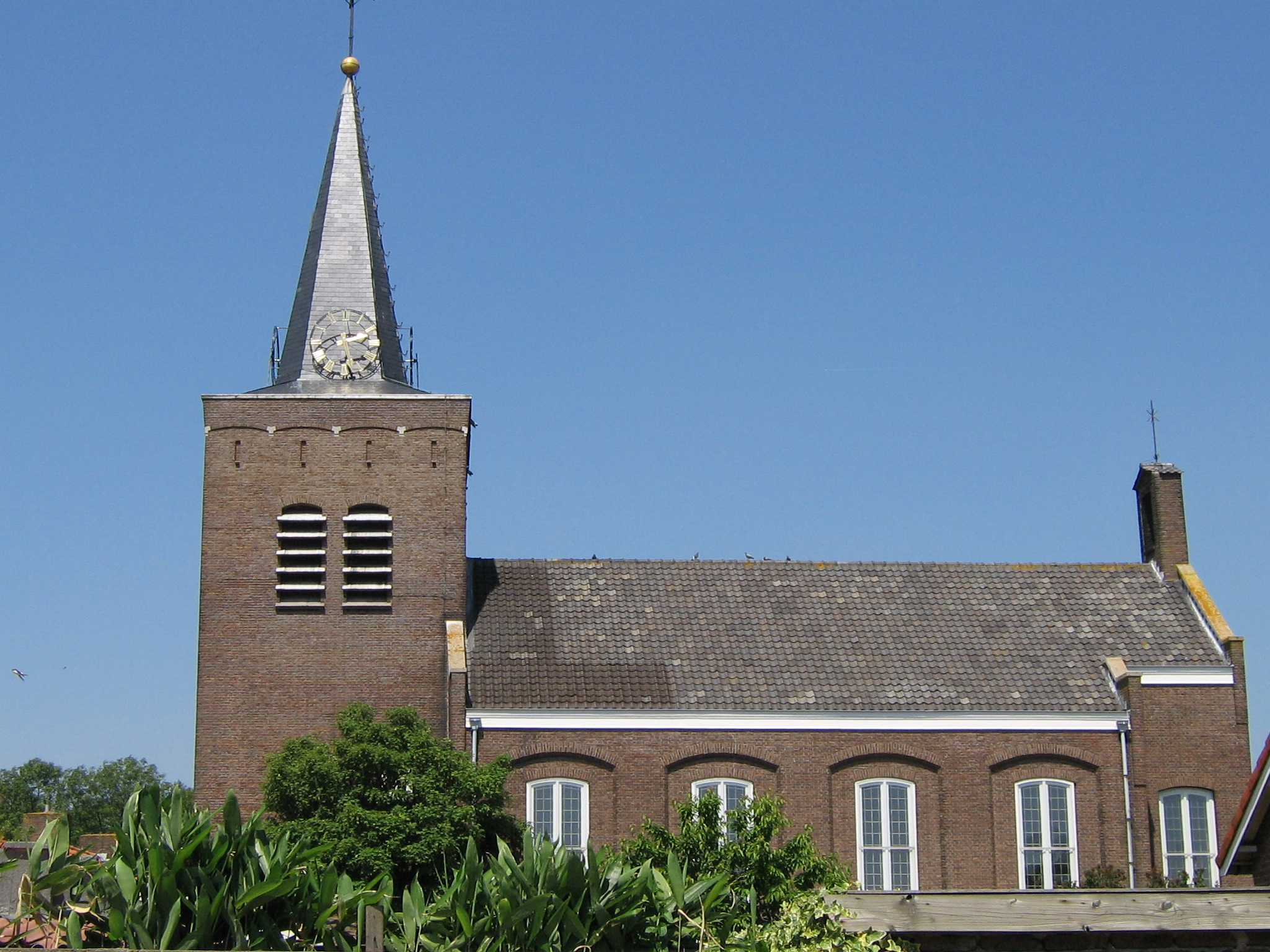
- Ellesdiek Church

- Flag Coat of arms

- Location in the province of Zeeland in the Netherlands Ellewoutsdijk (Netherlands)
- Coordinates: 51°23′25″N 3°48′57″E
- Country: Netherlands
- Province: Zeeland
- Municipality: Borsele

Area
  - Total: 6.41 km^{2} (2.47 sq mi)
- Elevation: 0.9 m (3.0 ft)

Population (2021)
  - Total: 375
  - Density: 58.5/km^{2} (152/sq mi)
- Time zone: UTC+1 (CET)
  - Summer (DST): UTC+2 (CEST)
- Postal code: 4437
- Dialing code: 0113

Ellewoutsdijk (Zeeuws: Ellesdiek) is a village in the Dutch province of Zeeland. It is a part of the municipality of Borsele, and lies about 18 km east of Vlissingen.

== History ==
The village was first mentioned in 1216 as Elewoldesdike, which means "dike of Elewold (person)". Ellewoutsdijk developed in the 11th century on a ridge on the former island of Borssele. A creek used to extend to the market square, but has silted up.

A church was known to be located on a terp (artificial hill) since 1216. The medieval church was destroyed in 1944 during World War II. Between 1948 and 1951, the current Dutch Reformed church was built on the foundations of its predecessor. It is an aisleless church with a wide tower.

A castle used to be located to the north of the village, and was home to the Lord of the heerlijkheid Ellewoutsdijk, Driewegen, Everinge en Coudorpe. The ruins of the castle were demolished after 1822. Zorgvlied is an estate built in 1881 on the location of the former castle Ellewoutsdijk as the summer residence of J.C. van Hattum, owner of a dredging company, who had made his fortune during the construction of the Suez Canal. The estate was destroyed in 1944. A modern villa has been built in its place. The park was damaged during the North Sea flood of 1953.

Fort Ellewoutsdijk was built between 1835 and 1839 after the independence of Belgium to control the Westerschelde. After the German invasion of the Netherlands, the Germans extended the fort and used it as a prison. After the war, it was used by the Ministry of Defence as an ammunition depot. It had been owned by Natuurmonumenten since 1981 and is publicly accessible.

Ellewoutsdijk was home to 706 people in 1840. In 1927, a railway station was built on the Goes to Hoedekenskerke railway line, but it closed in 1934. In 1944, the village was severely damaged during the Battle of the Scheldt. Ellewoutsdijk used to be an independent municipality until 1970, when it was merged into Borsele.

In 2003, the Westerscheldetunnel opened which is located between Ellewoutsdijk and Terneuzen. It is the longest tunnel in the Netherlands. The nearest exit is 10 kilometres (6.2 mi) by car from the village.

== Gallery ==
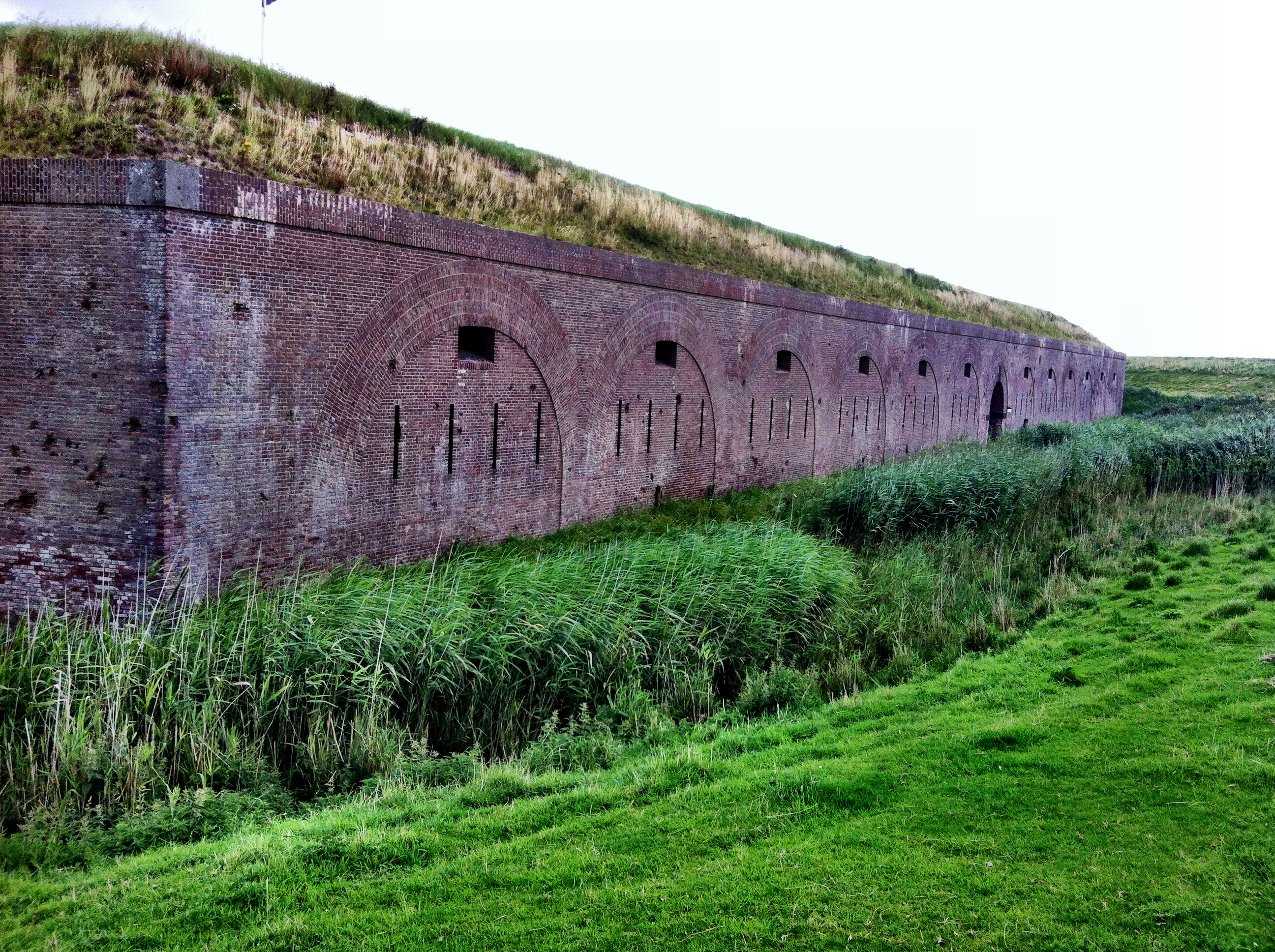
Fort Ellewoutsdijk

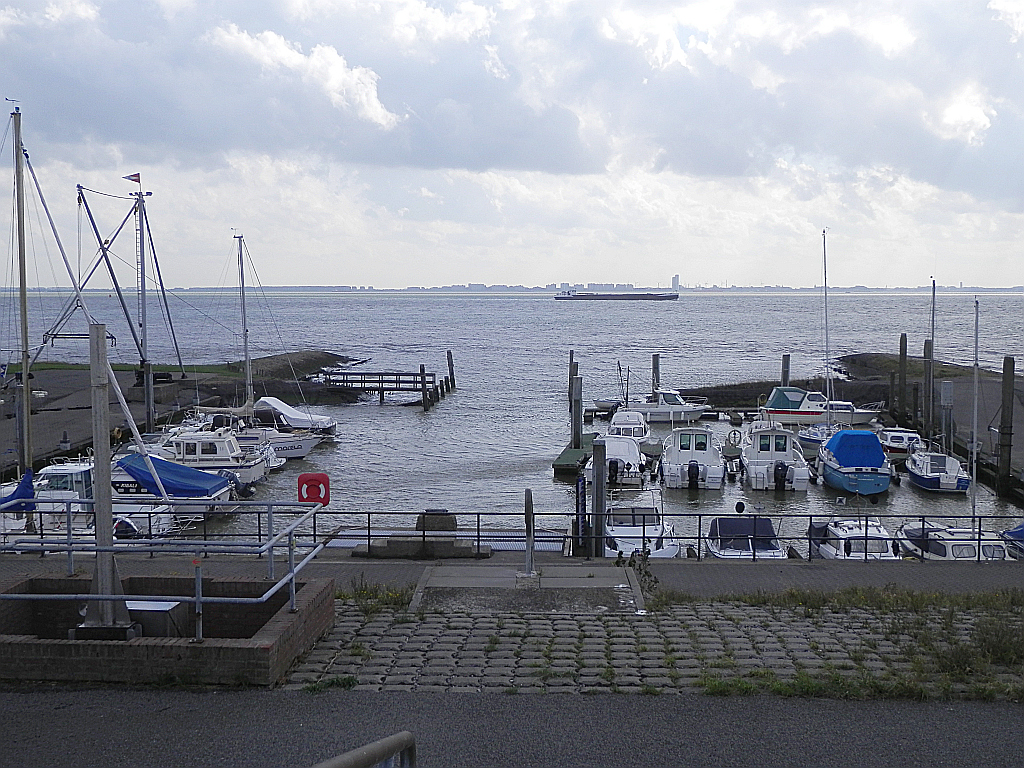
Harbour

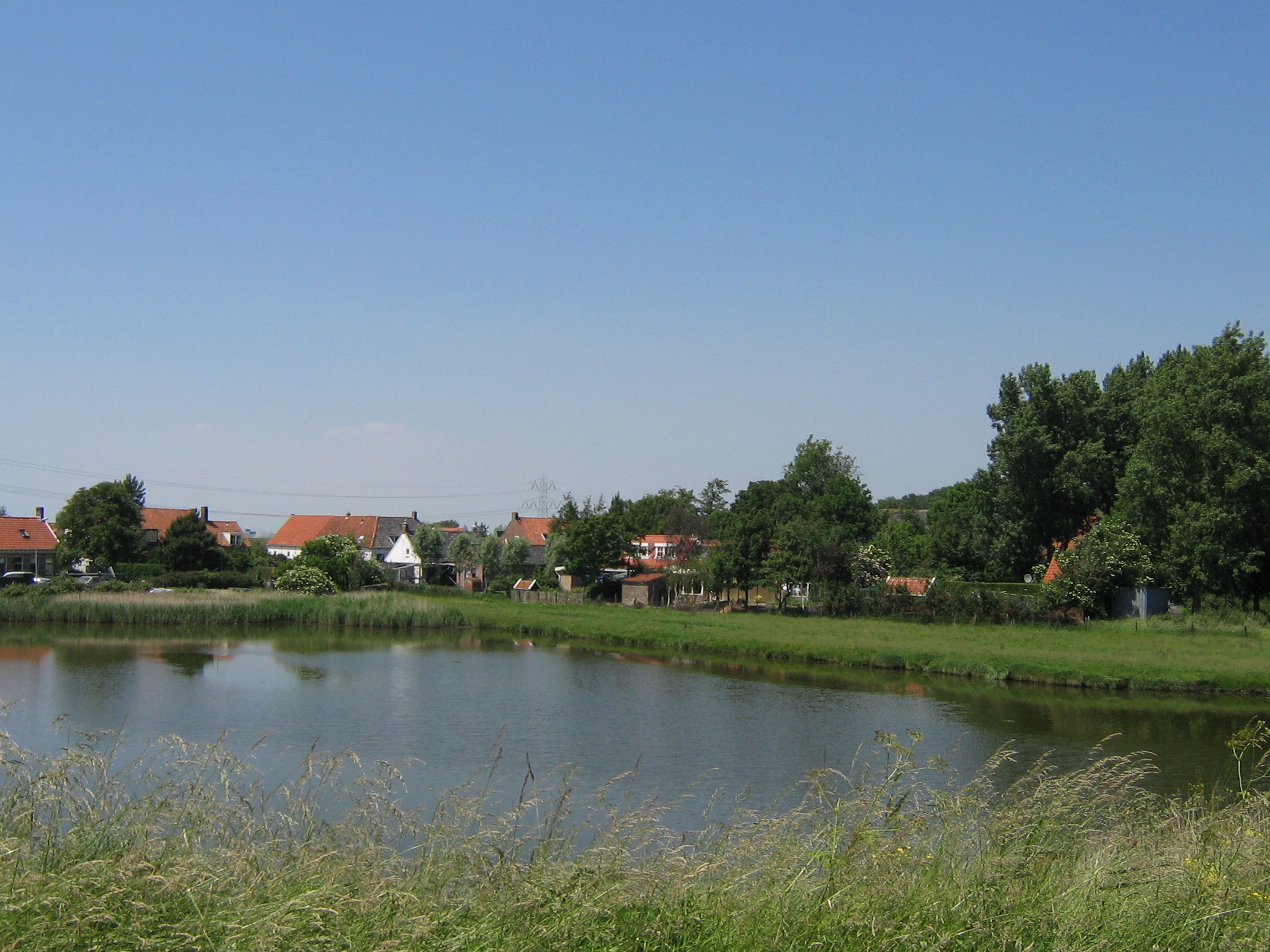
View on Ellewoutsdijk

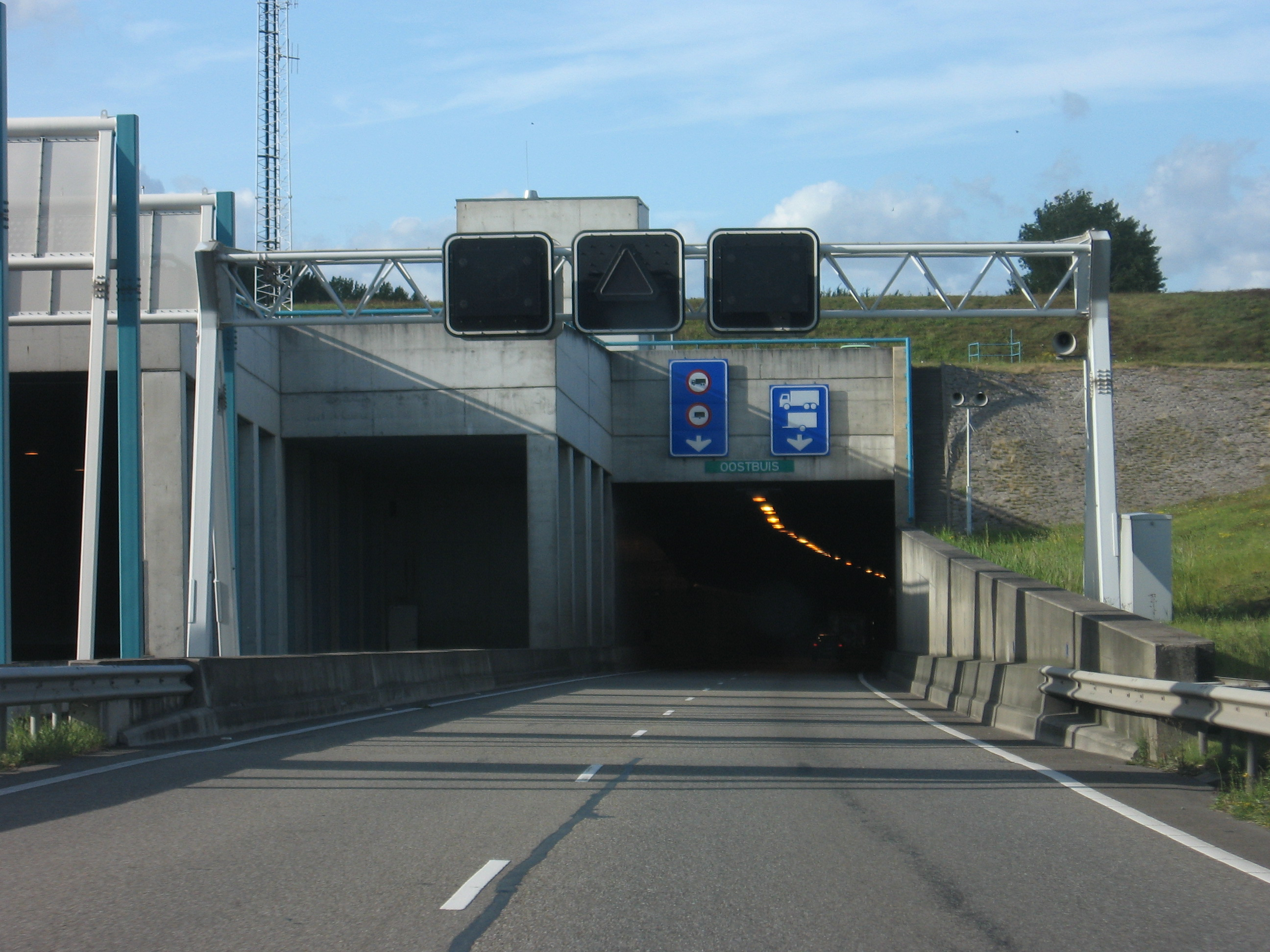
Westerscheldetunnel
