= Provincial road N201 (Netherlands) =

Highway in the Netherlands

Provincial highway 201
- Provinciale weg 201
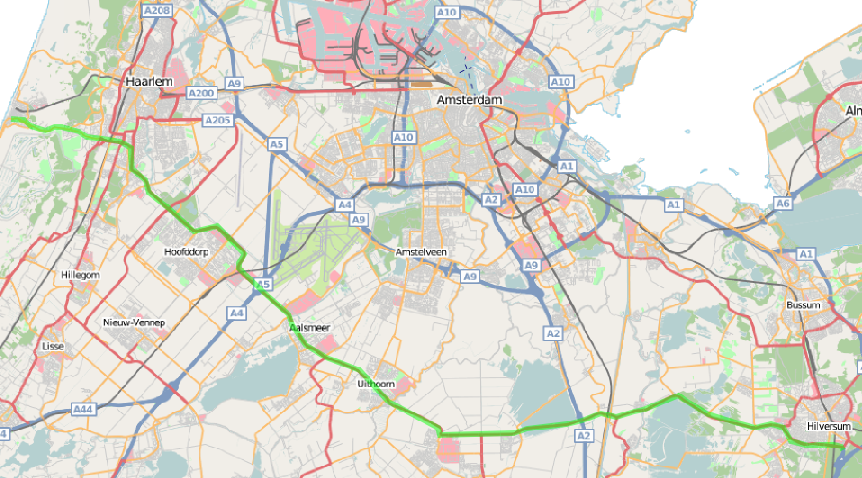

Major junctions
- West end: Zandvoort
- East end: Hilversum

Location
- Country: Kingdom of the Netherlands
- Constituent country: Netherlands
- Provinces: North Holland, Utrecht

Highway system
- Roads in the Netherlands; Motorways; E-roads; Provincial; City routes

Provincial road N201 is a Dutch provincial road.
