= Western Scheldt Tunnel =

Road tunnel in the Netherlands

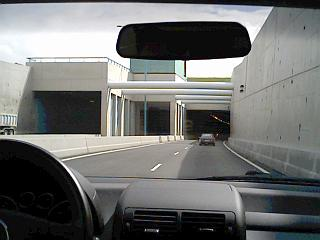
- Northern entrance of the Western Scheldt Tunnel
- Interactive map of Western Scheldt Tunnel

Overview
- Official name: Westerscheldetunnel
- Location: Zeeland, Netherlands
- Coordinates: 51.3691°N 3.7989°E
- Route: provincial road N62
- Crosses: Western Scheldt
- Start: Ellewoutsdijk (north end)
- End: Terneuzen (south end)

Operation
- Opened: 14 March 2003
- Owner: Province of Zeeland
- Toll: €18.20, camper vans Free, cars and motorcycles

Technical
- Length: 6,600 metres (21,700 ft; 4.1 mi)
- No. of lanes: 2 x 2
- Min elevation: −60 metres (−196 ft 10 in)
- Tunnel clearance: 4.3 metres (14 ft 1 in)
- Width: 2 x 11 metres (36 ft 1 in)
- Grade: max. 4.5%

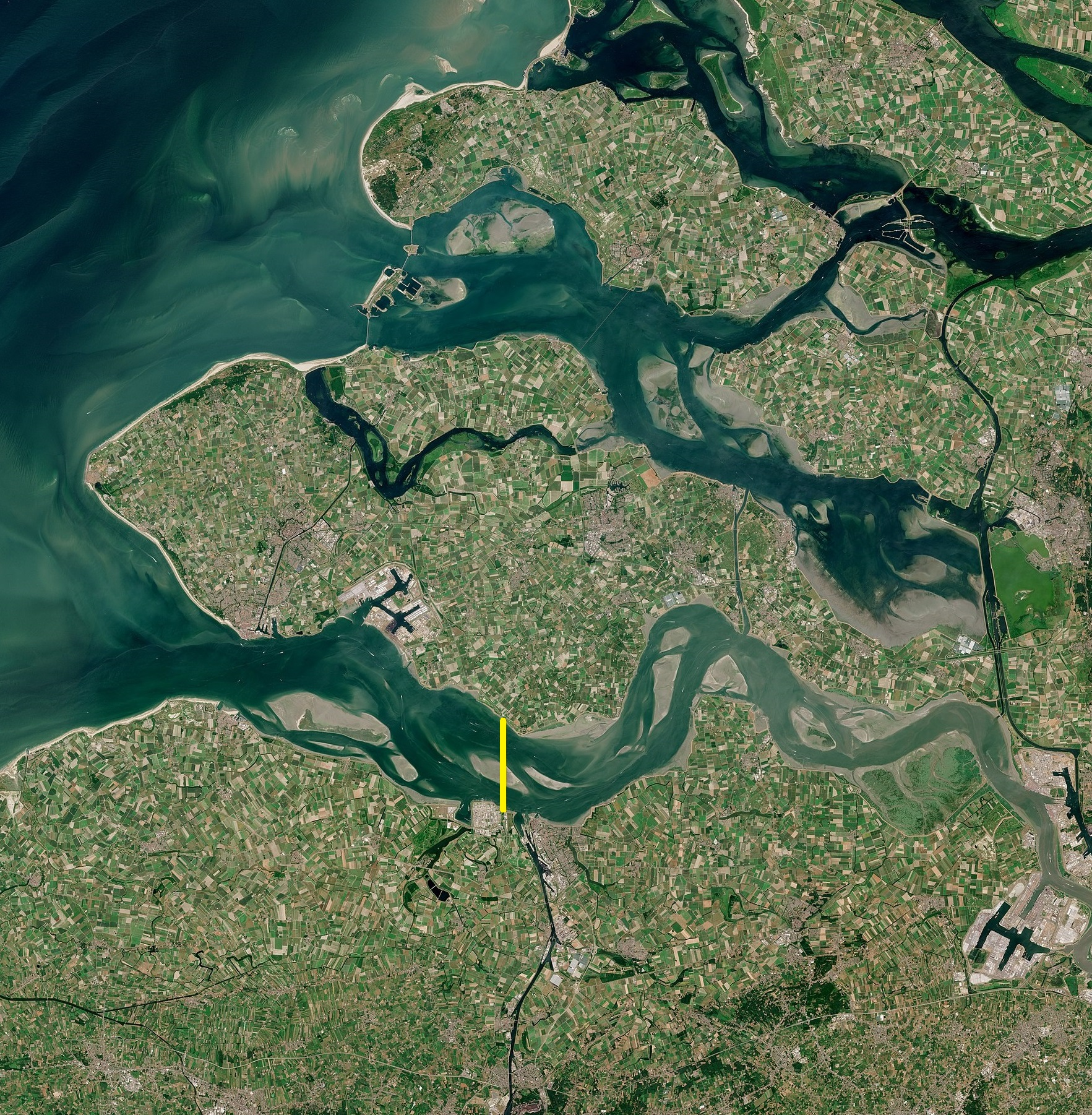
The Westerscheldetunnel (marked by the yellow line) connects the continental Zeelandic Flanders in the south with the peninsula of Zuid-Beveland in the north

The Western Scheldt Tunnel (Dutch: Westerscheldetunnel) is a road tunnel in the Netherlands that carries provincial road N62 under the Western Scheldt estuary between Ellewoutsdijk and Terneuzen. It is the only physical connection between Zeelandic Flanders (Zeeuws-Vlaanderen) and the middle part of Zeeland (Midden-Zeeland). At 6.6-kilometre (4.1 mi) long, it is the longest tunnel for highway traffic in the Netherlands.

== History and description ==
Connecting Zeelandic Flanders and Zuid-Beveland through a tunnel or bridge had been discussed in the House of Representatives since the 1950s. The tunnel was built by a consortium of Franki Construct, Heijmans, Royal BAM Group, Philipp Holzmann, TBI Beton- en Waterbouw Voormolen and Wayss & Freytag on behalf of NV Westerscheldetunnel (Western Scheldt Tunnel Company), which is 100% owned by the province of Zeeland. The tunnel was opened on 14 March 2003. After the tunnel was opened, the two automobile ferries between Flushing-Breskens and Kruiningen-Perkpolder, operated by the Provincial Steamboat Service (Provinciale Stoombootdiensten), were discontinued.

The Western Scheldt Tunnel consists of two tubes, excavated by a tunnel boring machine. Each tube has two car lanes without a hard shoulder. Every 250 metres, the two tunnel tubes are connected by lateral connections. Normally the cross-connections are closed and locked. In an emergency, the doors unlock automatically. The traffic in the left driving lane of the other tunnel is stopped, allowing people to walk safely into the other tunnel.

The Western Scheldt Tunnel is 11.3 metres (37 ft) diameter, 6.6 kilometres (4.1 mi) long, with on the south end a 1,200 metres (3,900 ft) stretch of road with an uphill grade of 4.5%. The maximum allowed clearance is 4.30 metres (14.1 ft). The tunnel reaches its deepest point under the Pas van Terneuzen shipping lane, 60 metres (200 ft) below sea level.

For both directions, the toll is collected near Borssele, near the north end of the tunnel. On average, it is used by over 15,000 vehicles per day.

== Bus services ==
The tunnel is not accessible for pedestrians, cyclists or moped riders; however, there are bus services and on request (one hour in advance) bicycles and mopeds can be transported in the bus and a trailer, respectively. Public transport nodes are Tolplein (Borsele) on the north bank and Terneuzen Busstation on the south bank. Bus services through these nodes are provided by Connexxion:

- Bus 20: Goes-Tolplein-Terneuzen bus station-Sluiskil-Sas van Gent-Zelzate (Flanders)
- Bus 50: between Middelburg and Hulst

== Tolls ==
Prior to December 2024 cars and motorcycles were required to pay a toll of €5, while cars with caravans paid a toll of €7.45. These tolls were removed on 30 December 2024, leaving only the tolls for small trucks, campers, and busses (€18.20), as well for large trucks (€25). Reduced tolls are available for subscribers (€9.15 and €12.50 for cat 3 and cat 4 vehicles respectively), there is no reduced toll for residents of Zeelandic Flanders (Zeeuws-Vlaanderen). Emergency vehicles and military vehicles can travel through the tunnel toll-free.
