= Provincial road N62 (Netherlands) =

Provincial road in Zeeland, Netherlands

Provincial highway 62
- Provinciale weg 62

Major junctions
- North end: A 58 in Heinkenszand

- N 254 in 's-Heerenhoek; N 666 in Borssele; N 252 in Hoek; N 61 in Sluiskil; N 290 in Terneuzen; N 683 in Westdorpe
- South end: Belgian border at Zelzate

Location
- Country: Kingdom of the Netherlands
- Constituent country: Netherlands
- Provinces: Zeeland
- Municipalities: Borsele, Terneuzen

Highway system
- Roads in the Netherlands; Motorways; E-roads; Provincial; City routes

Provincial road N62 is a motorway in Zeeland, running between the A58 motorway and the Belgian border at Zelzate. The 25-kilometre (16 mi) section between the Borsselsedijk and Spuikreek viaducts, which includes two tunnels, is operated by Western Scheldt Tunnel N.V., while the remaining 16.4 kilometres (10.2 mi) is operated by the province.

N62 begins at Stellepas Interchange and continues to Drie Klauwen Interchange. It has an exit to reach provincial road N666 in Borssele before passing a toll plaza and entering the Western Scheldt Tunnel. Subsequently, provincial road N252 at the Port of Terneuzen can be accessed through an exit as well as provincial road N61 in Terneuzen through Axelsche Gat Interchange. N62 then travels through the Sluiskil Tunnel and to the Belgian border at Zelzate with exits to provincial roads N290 in Terneuzen and N683 in Westdorpe.

The roads operated by the Western Scheldt Tunnel N.V. were turned into a dual carriageway between 2008 and 2012, and the Sluiskil Tunnel opened in 2015. The Sloeweg and Tractaatweg were similary turned into dual carriageways, and the Drie Klauwen Interchange was constructed. Operational management of N62 is planned to be transferred to Rijkswaterstaat, part of the national government, in 2033.
