= Breskens =

- Harbour town
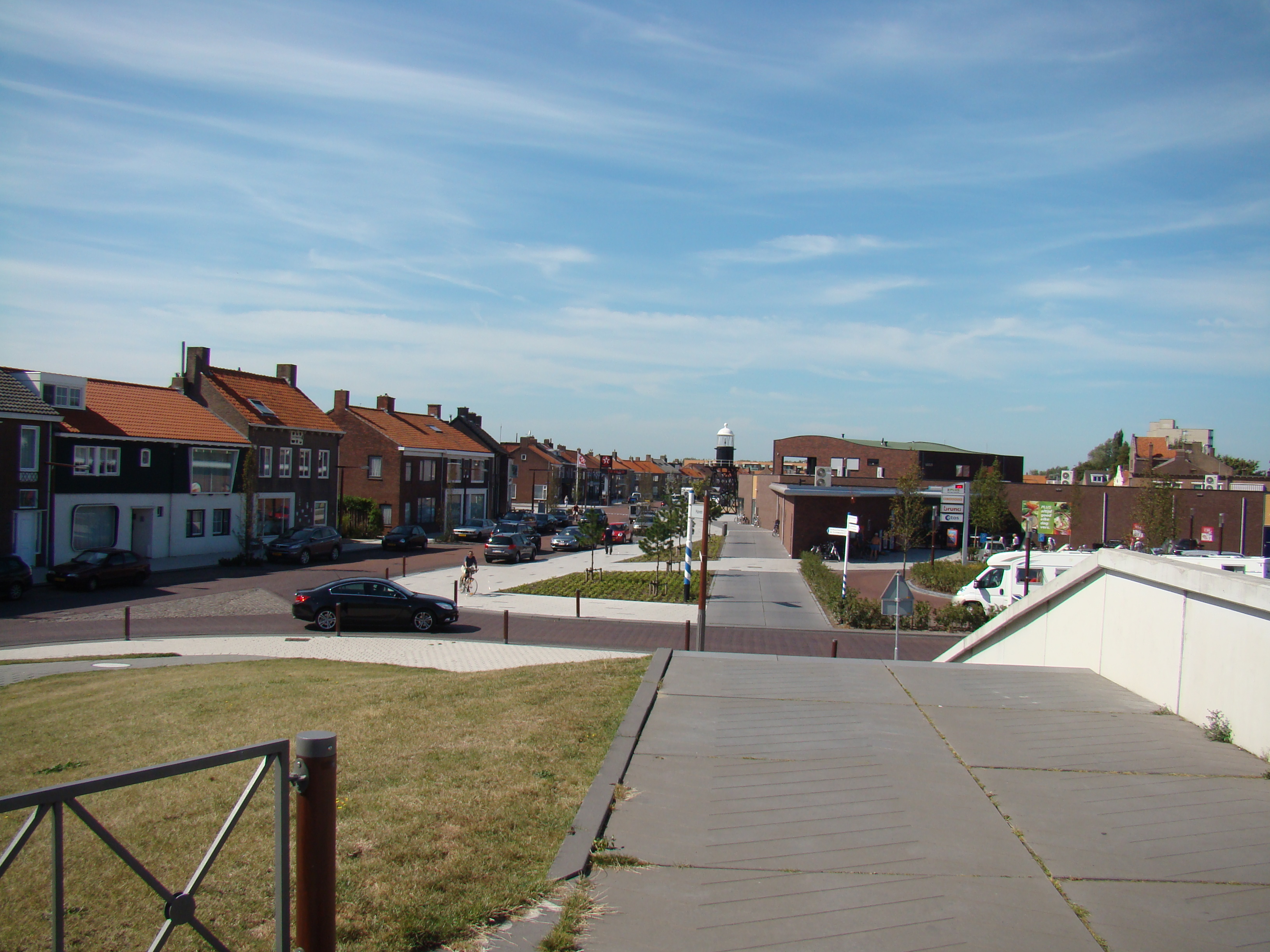
- The promenade of Breskens

- Flag Coat of arms

- Location in the province of Zeeland in the Netherlands Breskens (Netherlands)
- Coordinates: 51°23′42″N 3°33′25″E
- Country: Netherlands
- Province: Zeeland
- Municipality: Sluis

Area
  - Total: 14.23 km^{2} (5.49 sq mi)
- Elevation: 2.8 m (9.2 ft)

Population (2021)
  - Total: 4,630
  - Density: 325/km^{2} (843/sq mi)
- Time zone: UTC+1 (CET)
  - Summer (DST): UTC+2 (CEST)
- Postal code: 4511
- Dialing code: 0111

Breskens is a harbour town on the Westerschelde in the municipality of Sluis, Netherlands. Its population is 4,787 (as of 2010), and it is 2.8 m (9.2 ft) above sea level.

The town is noted for the Visserijfeesten (Fishery Festival), the largest festival in Zeeland.

A ferry connection exists between Breskens and Vlissingen. After the opening of the Western Scheldt Tunnel near Terneuzen in 2003, the ferry now only carries pedestrian and bicycle traffic.

== Sights ==
The lighthouse of Breskens is the oldest remaining cast-iron lighthouse in the Netherlands. It was built in 1867 and became a monument in 1982.

== History ==
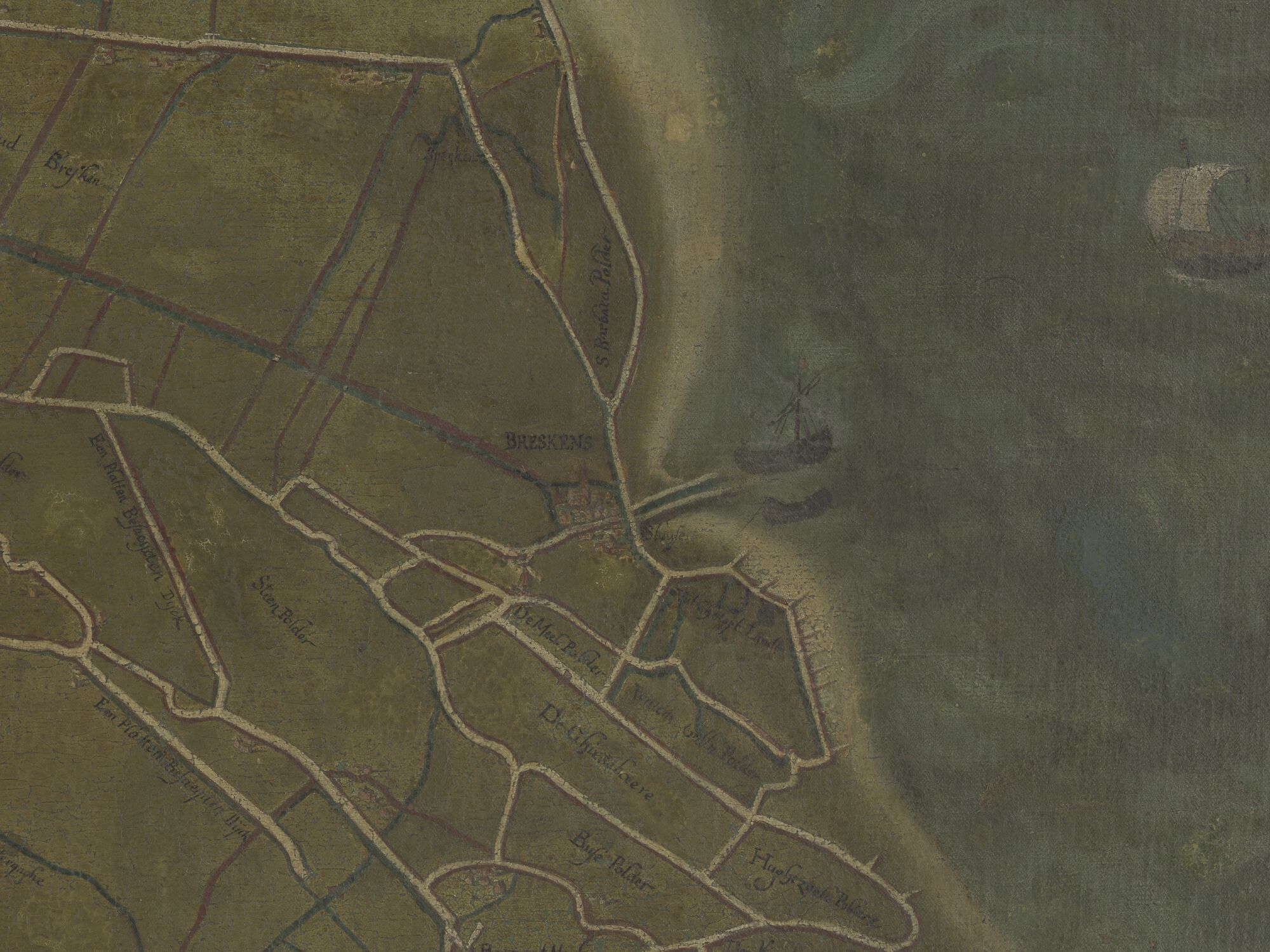
Breskens on the map of the Liberty of Bruges by Pieter Pourbus, 1571

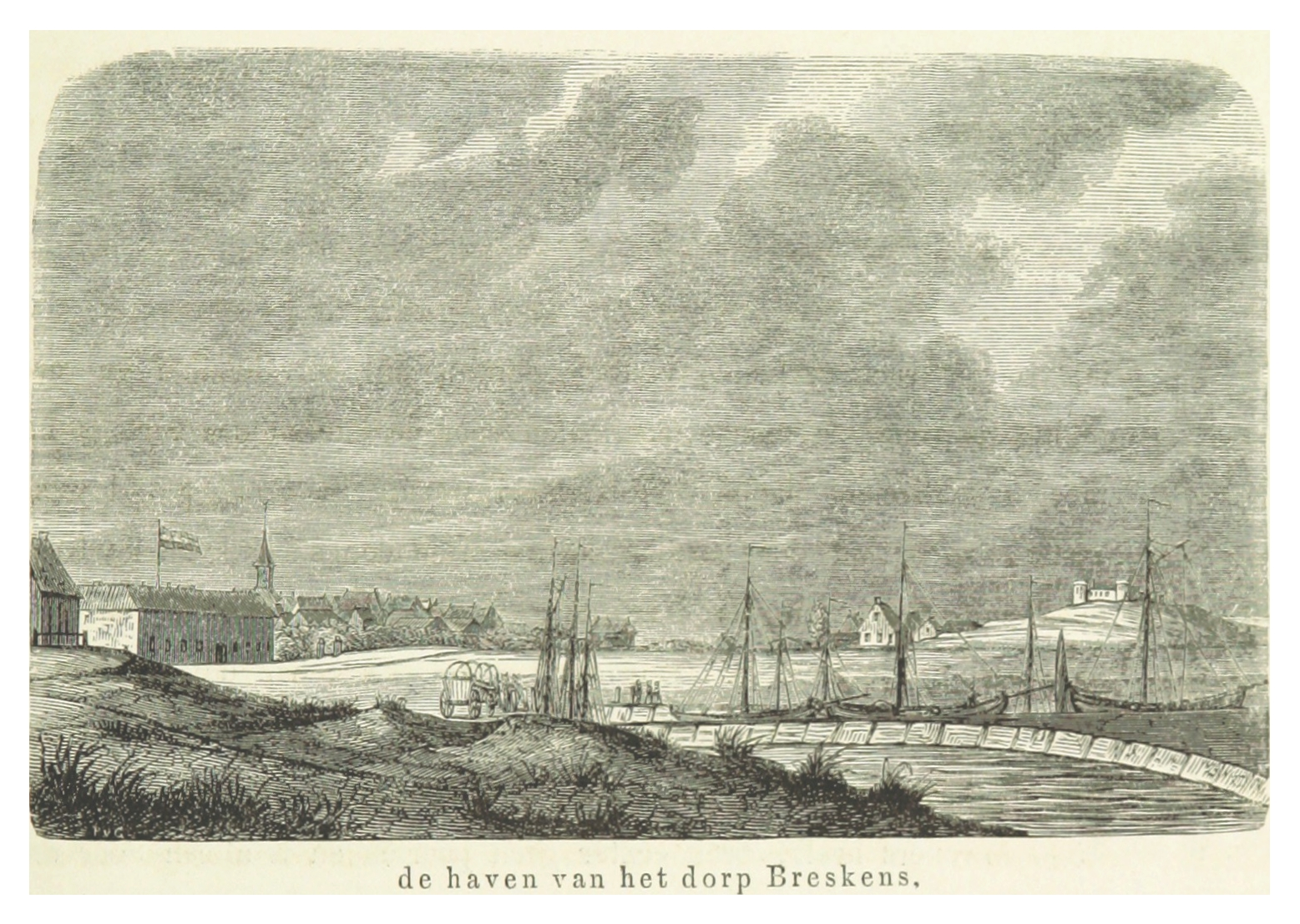
Breskens, c. 1855.

In early 1487, Maximilian I granted the coastal region of the Scheldt as a fief to Philip of Cleves. The coastal areas were drained and the village of Breskens was founded in 1510.

On 14 May 1940, with the German army approaching, the Dutch government fled to London. Queen Wilhelmina initially ordered the British captain removing her from The Hague to set sail for Breskens from where she wished to lead the resistance against the invading armies. One of the reasons was that Breskens, having two fortresses in the vicinity, could be well defended. She was advised by the captain that he was under orders not to make contact with the Dutch shore as it was under heavy air attack, so Wilhelmina took the decision reluctantly to go to Britain, planning to return as soon as possible.

On 11 September 1944, during Operation Switchback, the town was carpet-bombed by Allied forces, leaving very little of the historical centre intact. After the war, the town was rebuilt and became a centre for the Dutch fish industry and other maritime-related businesses.

In the nineties, with the fish-industry in terminal decline, tourism became the main economic focus and a number of high-rise apartment blocks were built on the waterfront.

Prior to 1 January 2003, the town was incorporated in the municipality of Oostburg.

== Gallery ==
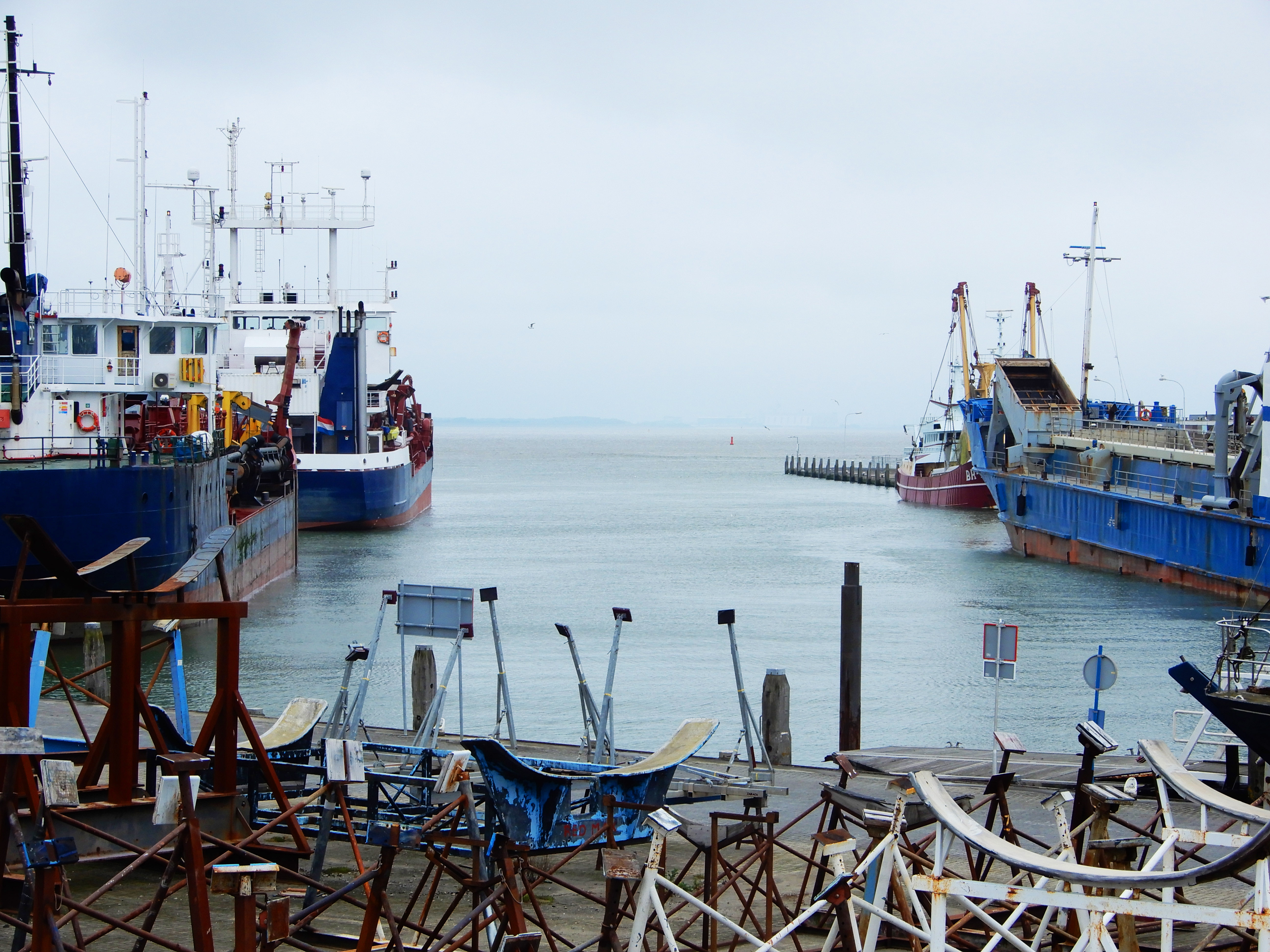
The harbour of Breskens

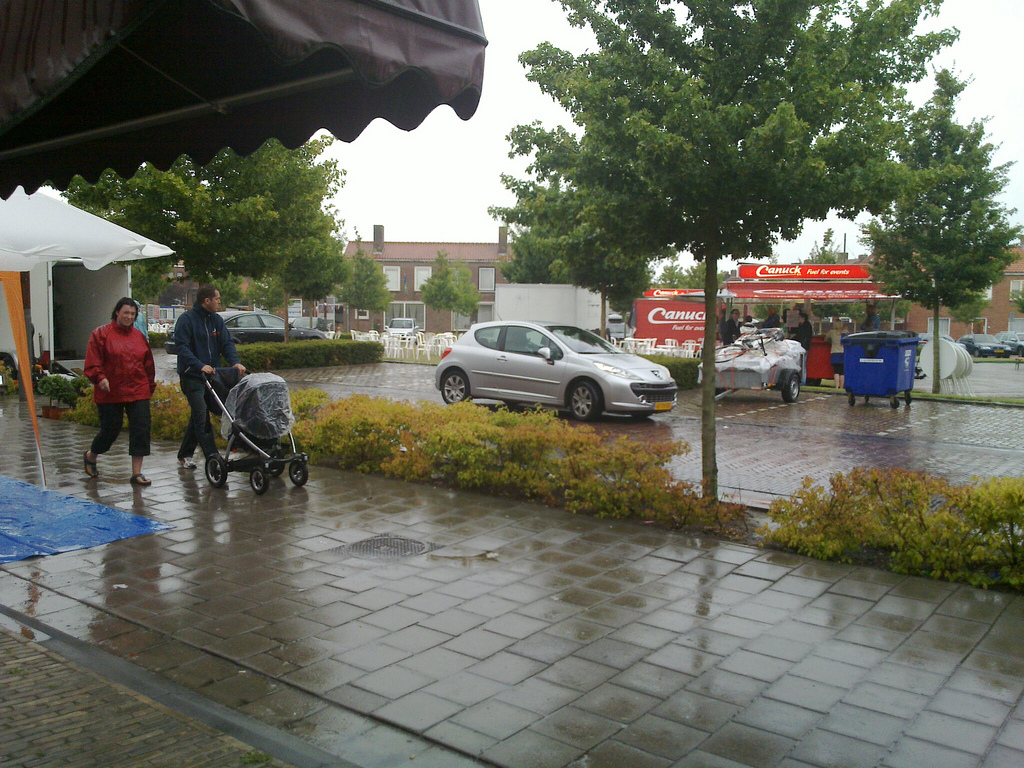
Street view in the rain

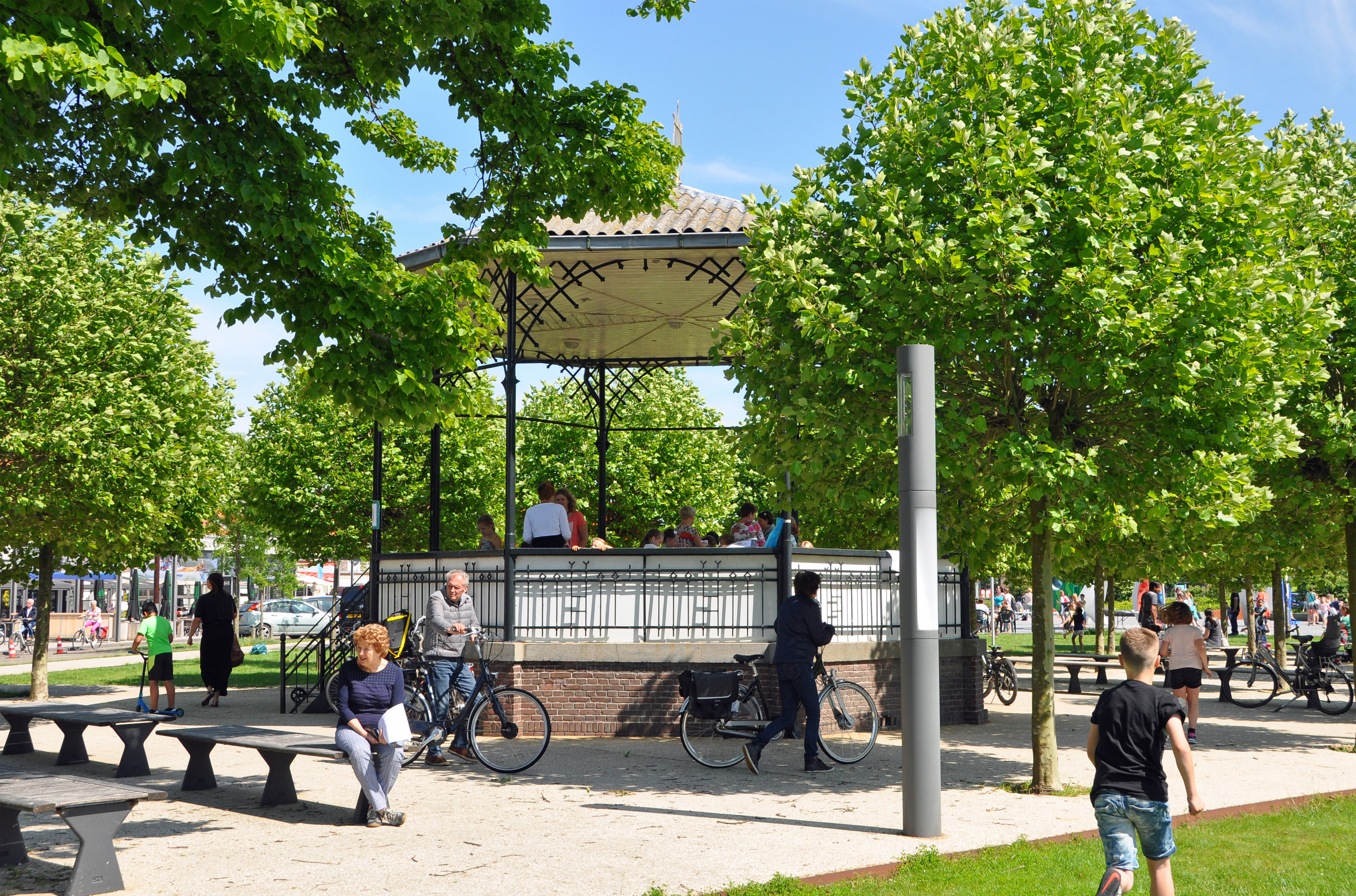
Bandstand

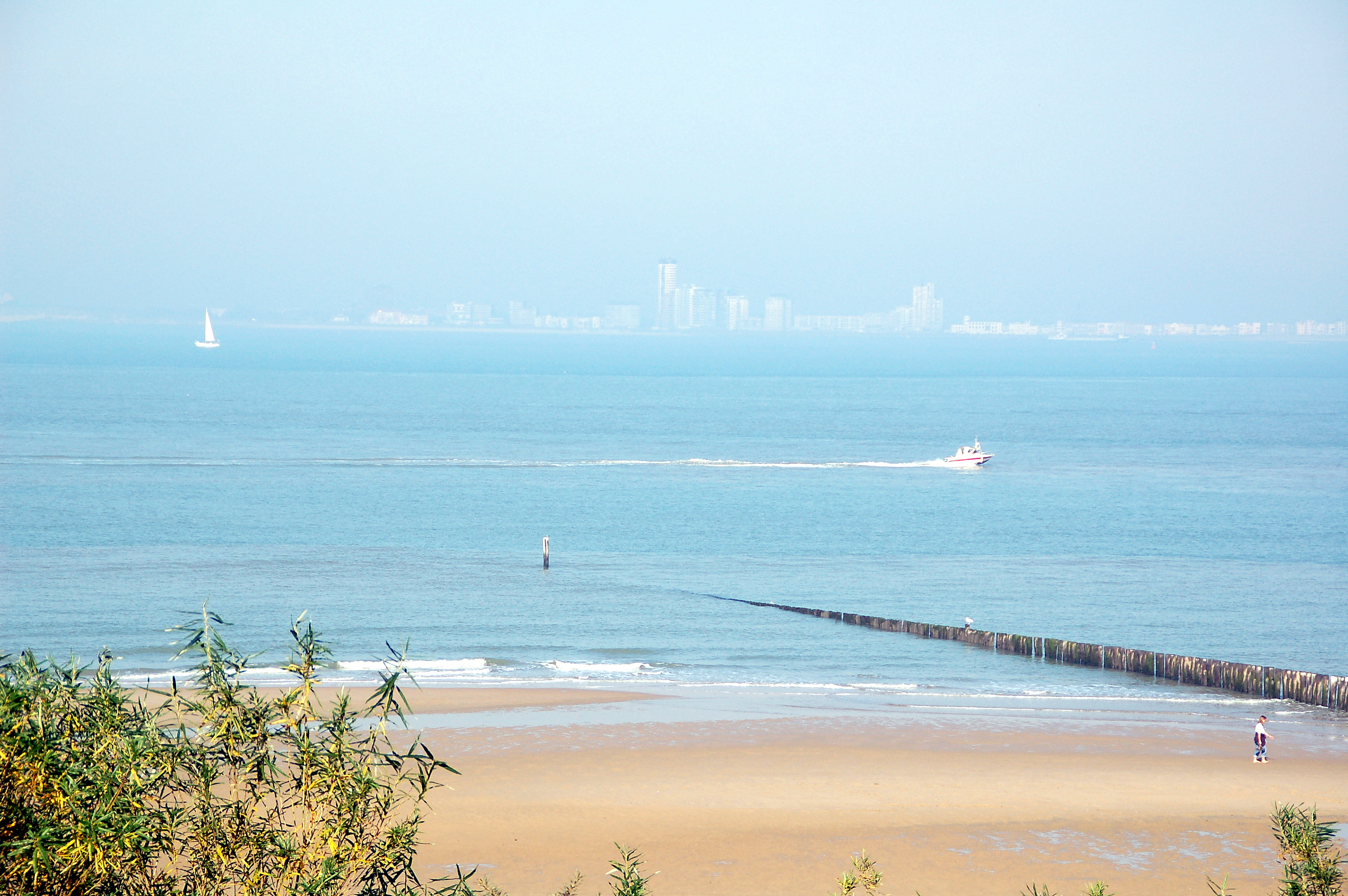
The beach of Breskens with Vlissingen in the background
