= Etten, Netherlands =

Etten
- Village
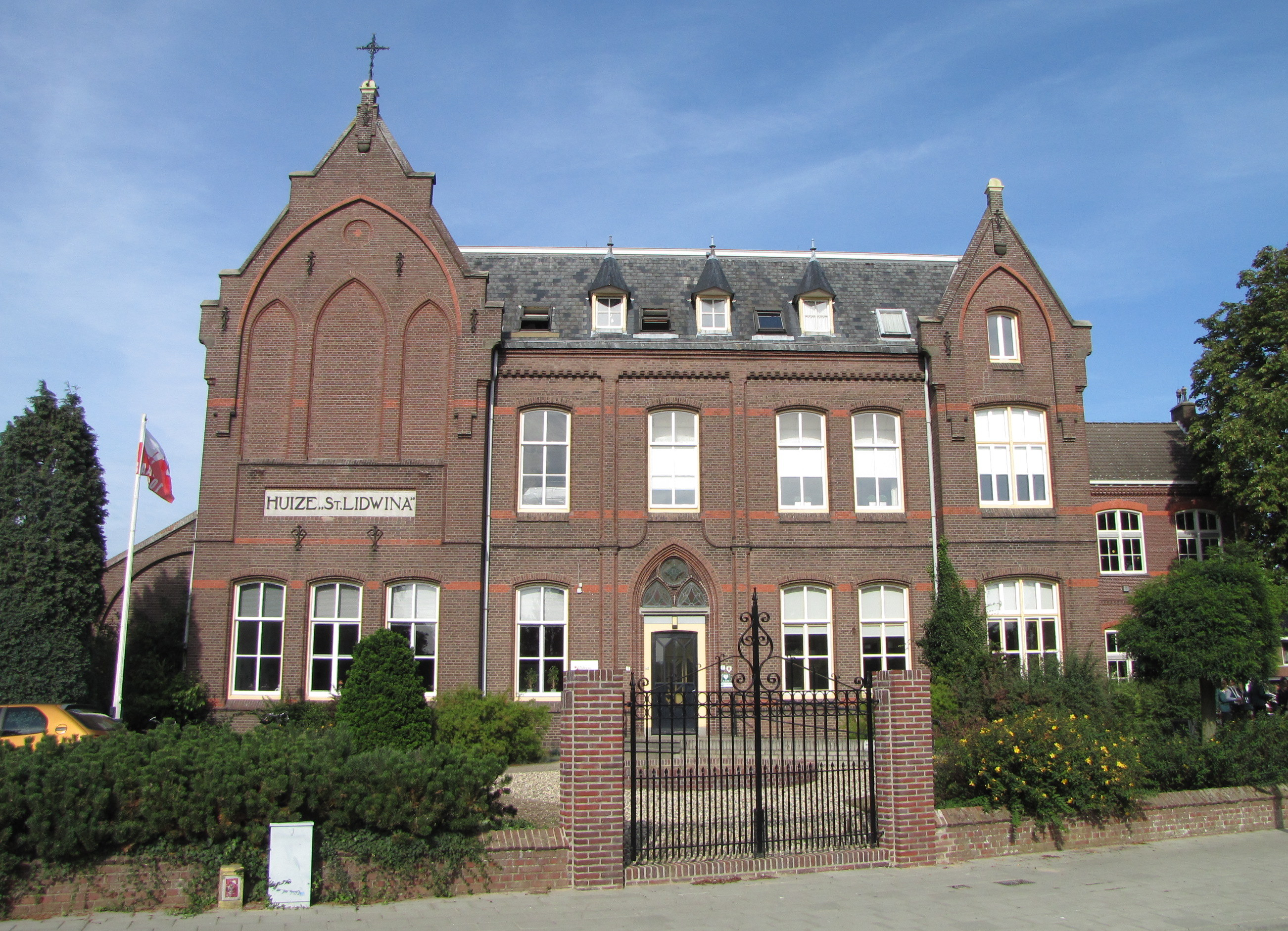
- Former monastery St Lidwina

- Location in the Netherlands Etten (Netherlands)
- Coordinates: 51°55′0″N 6°20′11″E
- Country: Netherlands
- Province: Gelderland
- Municipality: Oude IJsselstreek

Area
  - Total: 10.97 km^{2} (4.24 sq mi)
- Elevation: 14 m (46 ft)

Population (2021)
  - Total: 1,850
  - Density: 169/km^{2} (437/sq mi)
- Time zone: UTC+1 (CET)
  - Summer (DST): UTC+2 (CEST)
- Postal code: 7075
- Dialing code: 0315

Etten is a village in the Dutch province of Gelderland. It is located in the municipality of Oude IJsselstreek, 7 km southeast of Doetinchem.

Etten was a separate municipality until 1818, when it was merged with Gendringen.

== History ==
The village was first mentioned around 1200 as de Ettene. The etymology is unclear. The village started on a river dune along the Oude IJssel. The Dutch Reformed Church there dates from the 15th century with 11th century elements. Castle Schuylenburgh was a medieval castle in the village that was bombed twice during World War II, and later demolished. In 1840, the village was home to 292 people.

== Gallery ==
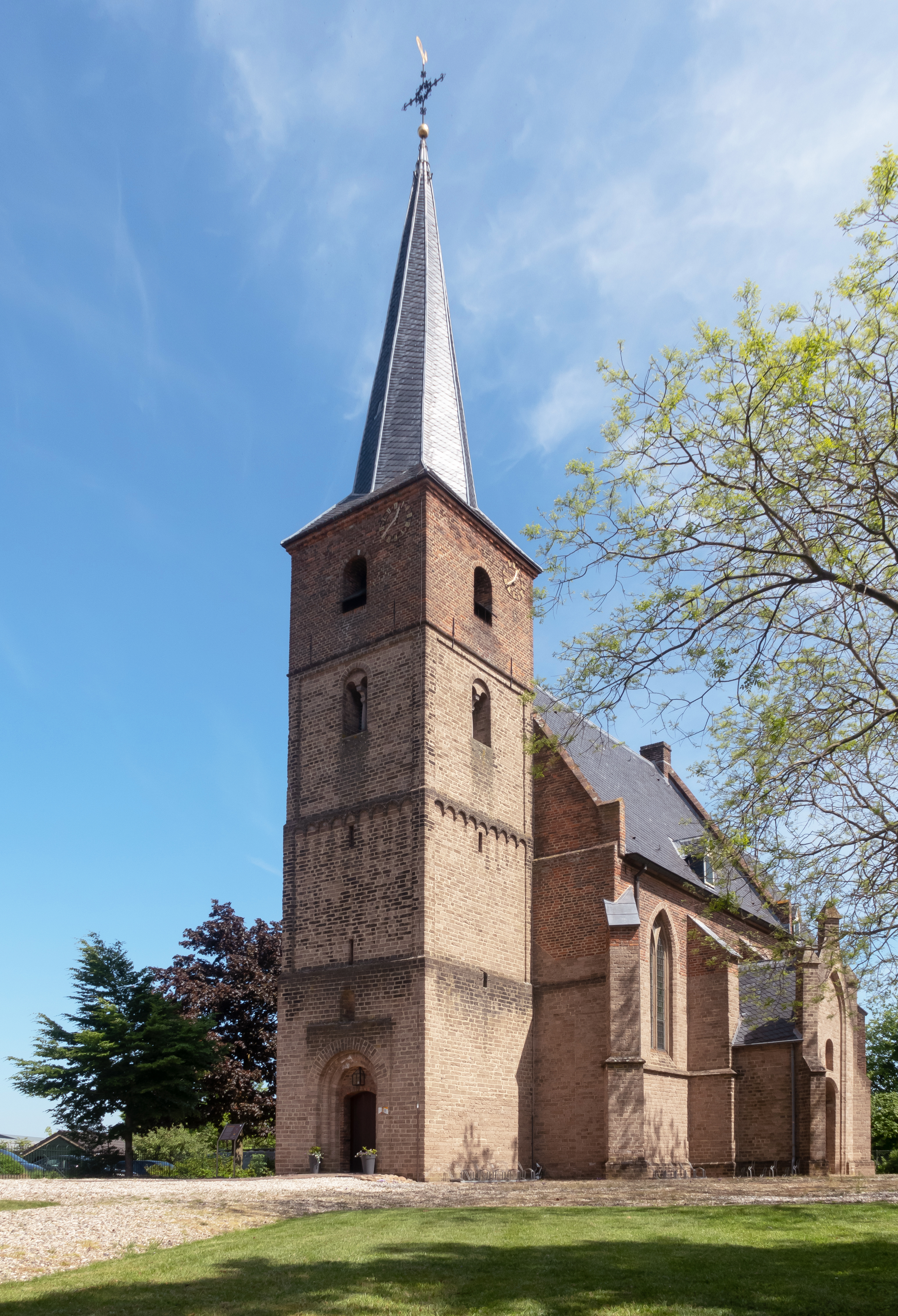
Etten, reformed church

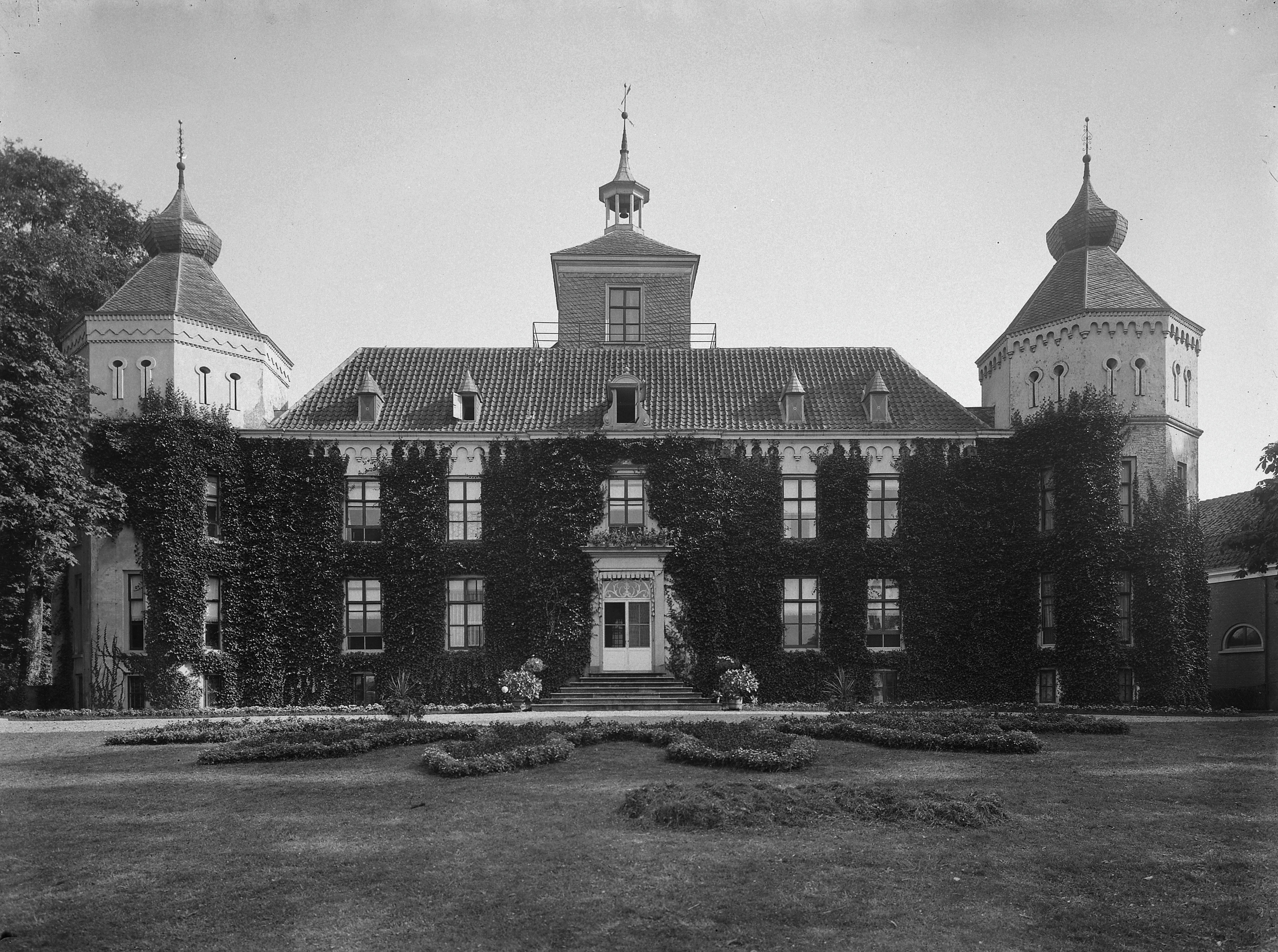
Castle Schuylenburgh

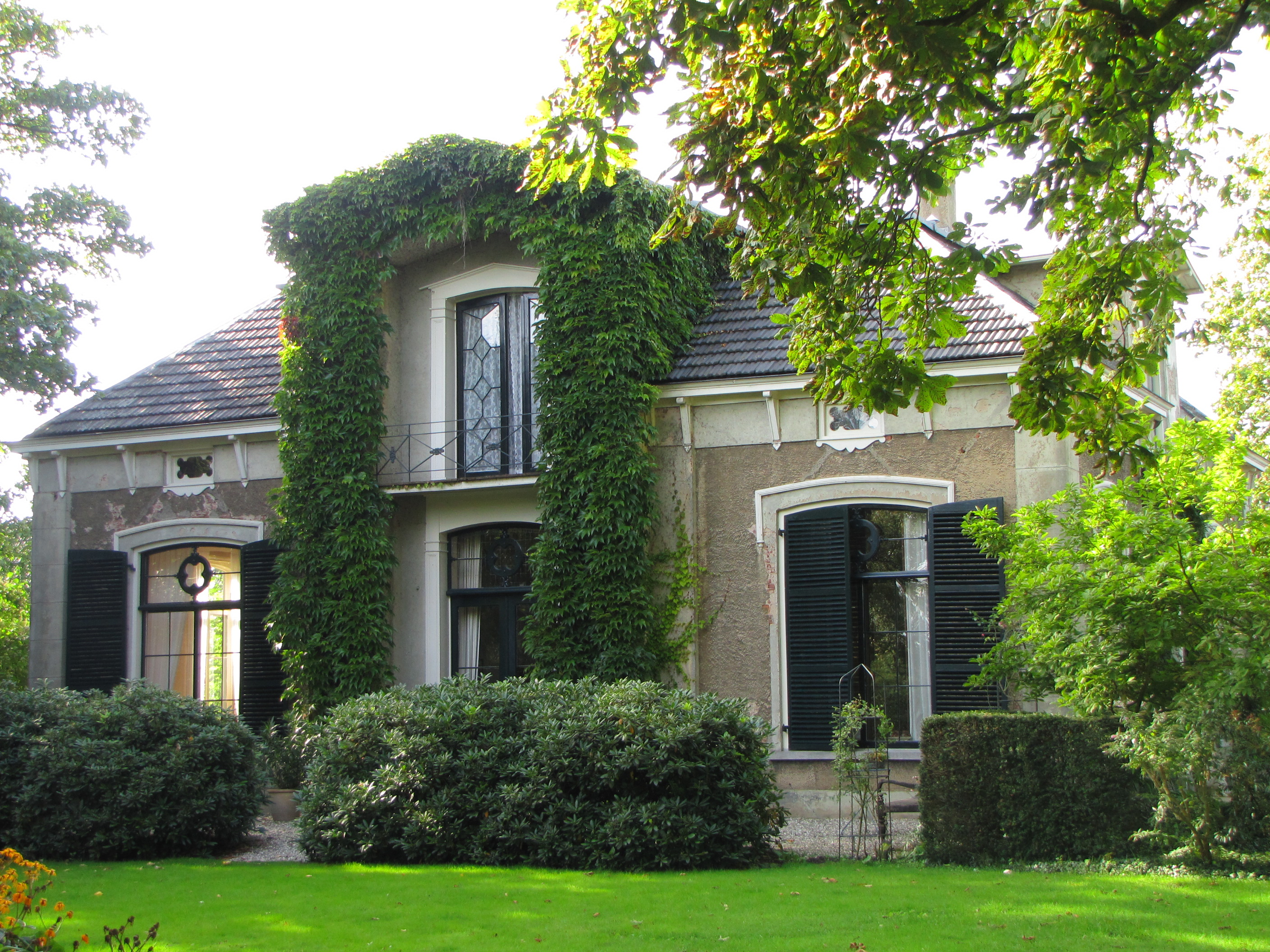
House in Etten

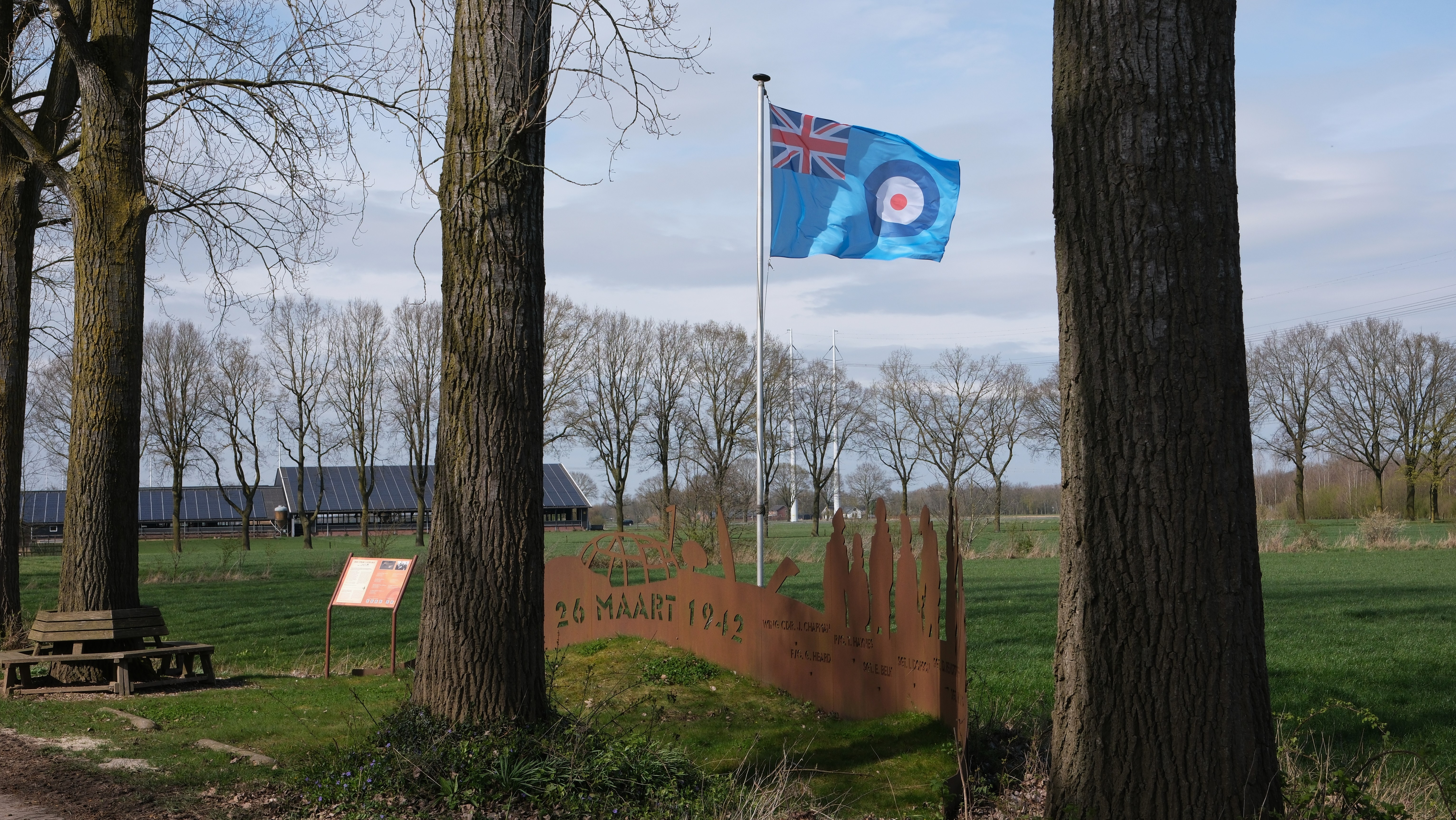
Commemoration of a British bomber
