= Bleskensgraaf =

- Town
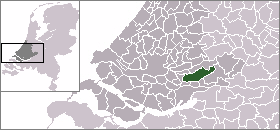

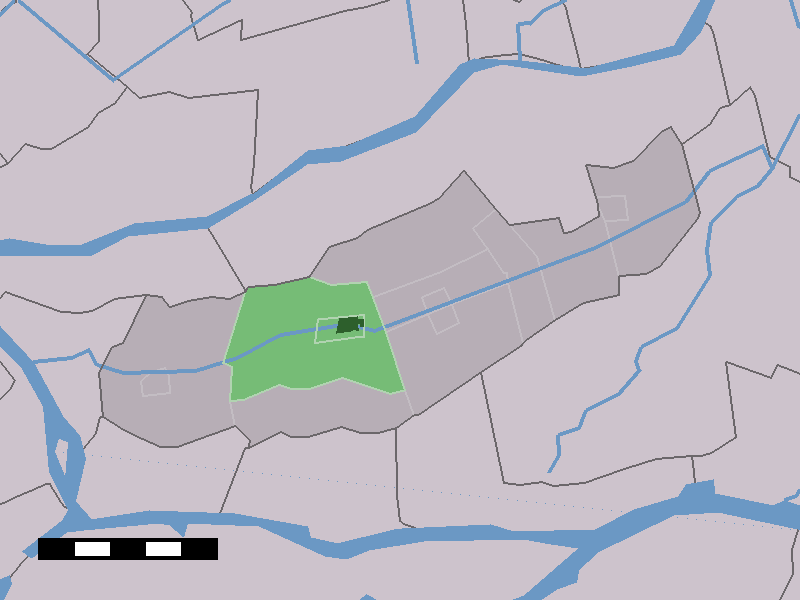
- The town centre (dark green) and the statistical district (light green) of Bleskensgraaf in the former municipality of Graafstroom.
- Coordinates: 51°52′N 4°47′E
- Country: Netherlands
- Province: South Holland
- Municipality: Molenlanden

Area
  - Total: 12.7 km^{2} (4.9 sq mi)

Population
  - Total: 2,788
  - Density: 220/km^{2} (569/sq mi)
- Time zone: UTC+1 (CET)
  - Summer (DST): UTC+2 (CEST)

Bleskensgraaf is a town in the Dutch province of South Holland. It is a part of the municipality of Molenlanden, and lies about 10 km northeast of Dordrecht. It has an area of 1272 hectares. On 1 January 2009 Bleskensgraaf and Hofwegen had 2797 inhabitants in 936 residences.

Until 1855, Bleskensgraaf was a separate municipality. In 1855 the heerlijkheid or seigniory Bleskensgraaf and the heerlijkheid or seigniory 'Hofwegen' merged into one municipality named 'Bleskensgraaf and Hofwegen'. In 1986 it became the new municipality Graafstroom together with 6 adjacent towns. The town hall of Graafstroom was located in Bleskensgraaf. From 2013 Graafstroom was part of Molenwaard, till 2019 when it merged into Molenlanden.

The town got its name because of the landlord (count) "Willem van Blassekijn". Over the years the name Blassekijnsgraeve changed into Bleskensgraaf.

On letters it often says "Bleskensgraaf CA". CA stands for the Latin phrase 'cum annexis' which means 'with surroundings'.

The centre of Bleskensgraaf is made up out of new buildings. The old centre was bombarded during the Second World War at 06:25 on 12 May 1940. Seven people died and forty houses were destroyed. The town hall was leveled and the church sustained irreparable damage. The reconstruction was fast and took a couple of years. In September 1948 the new church officially opened and the new town hall opened on 12 May 1955.

Old buildings that remain are a couple of windmills: the flour mill 'Molen de Vriendschap' (Friendship Mill) built in 1890 and two Hollow post mills, named the 'Hofwegense Molen' and the 'Wingerdse Molen' built in 1513, and many old farmhouses.

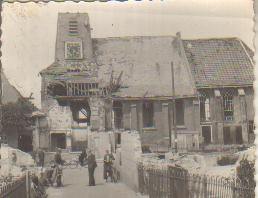
The damaged Dutch Reformed church after the bombardment

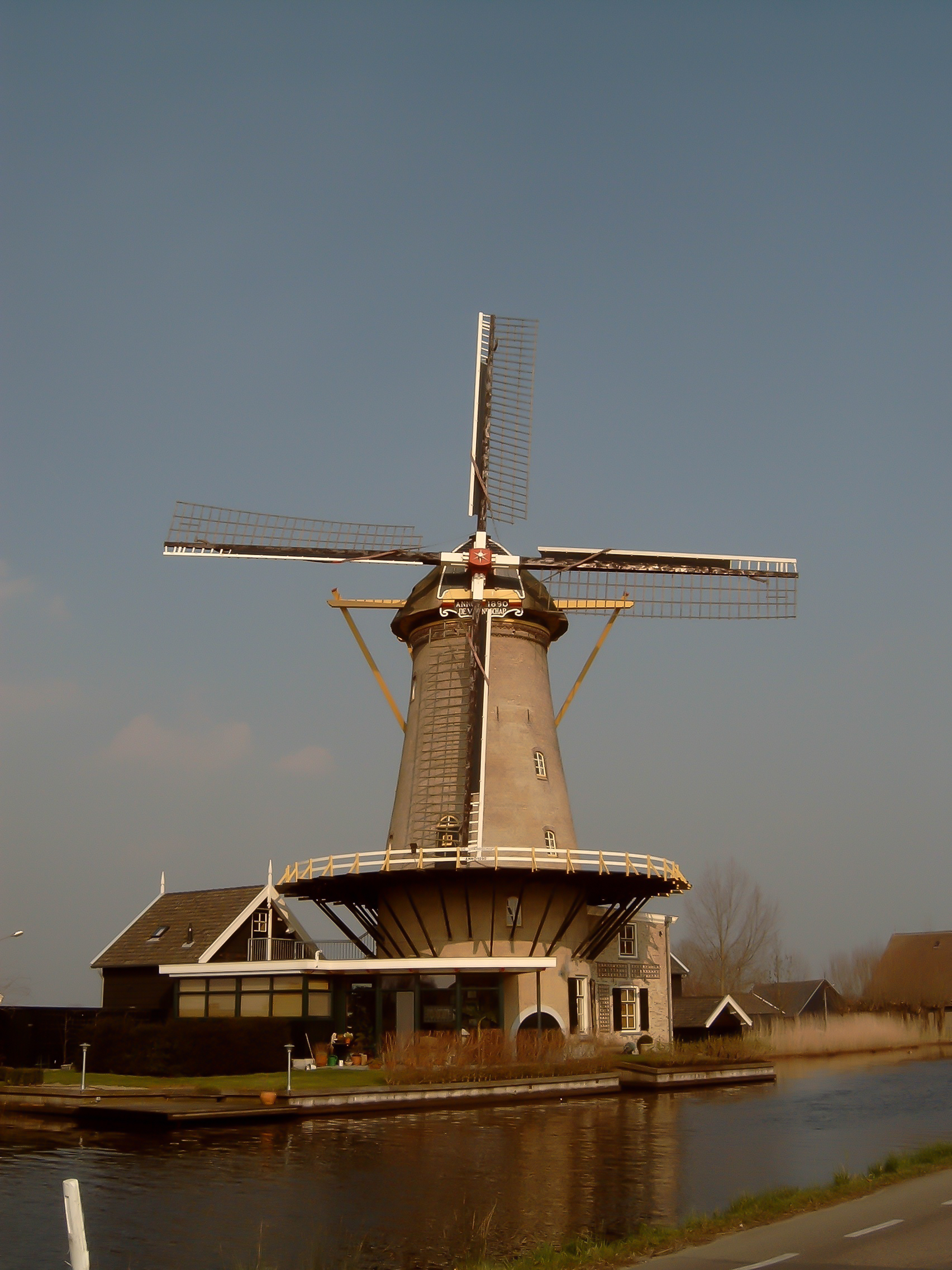
Flourmill 'De Vriendschap'

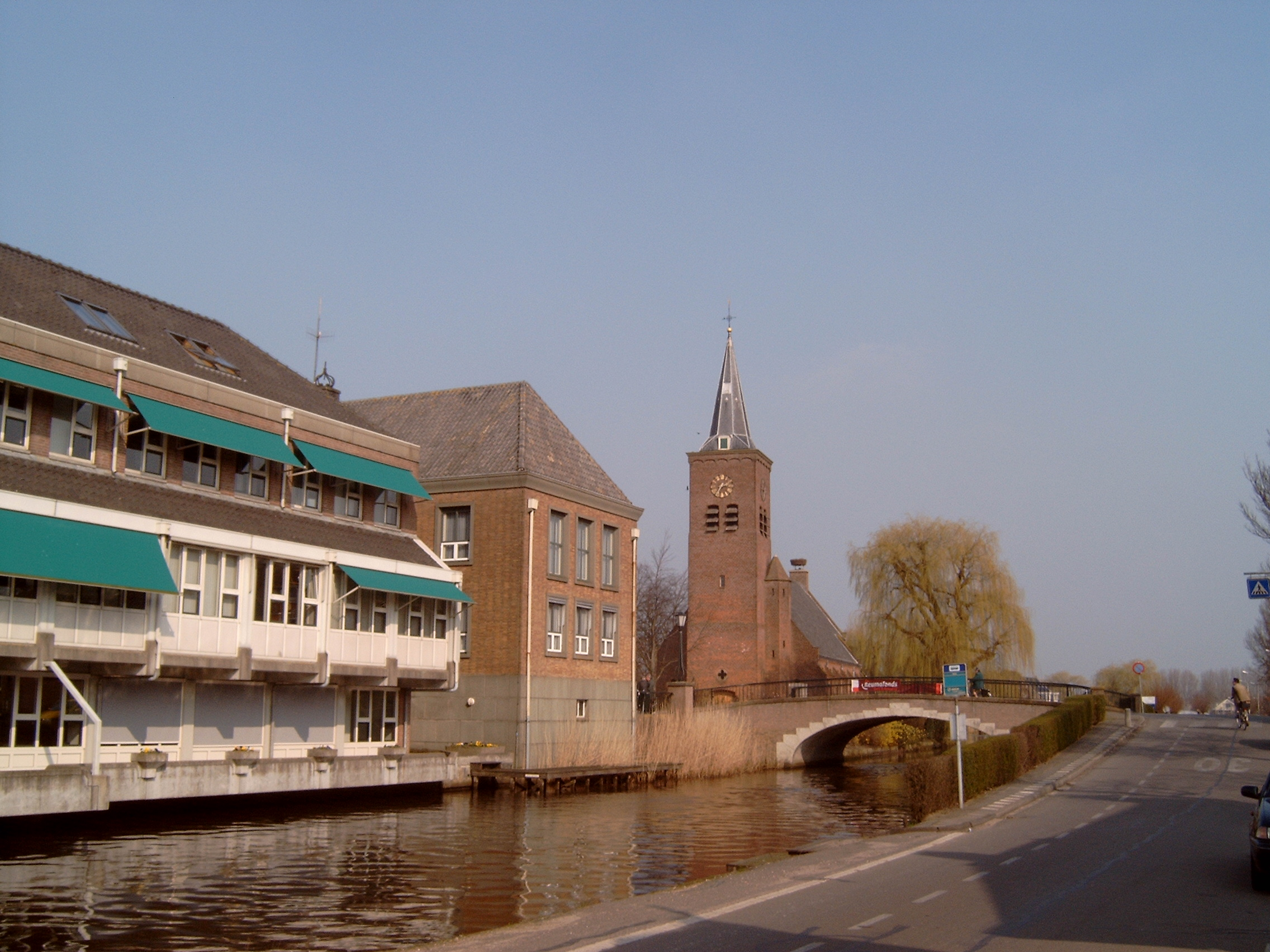
Left: Town Hall
Right: Dutch Reformed Church

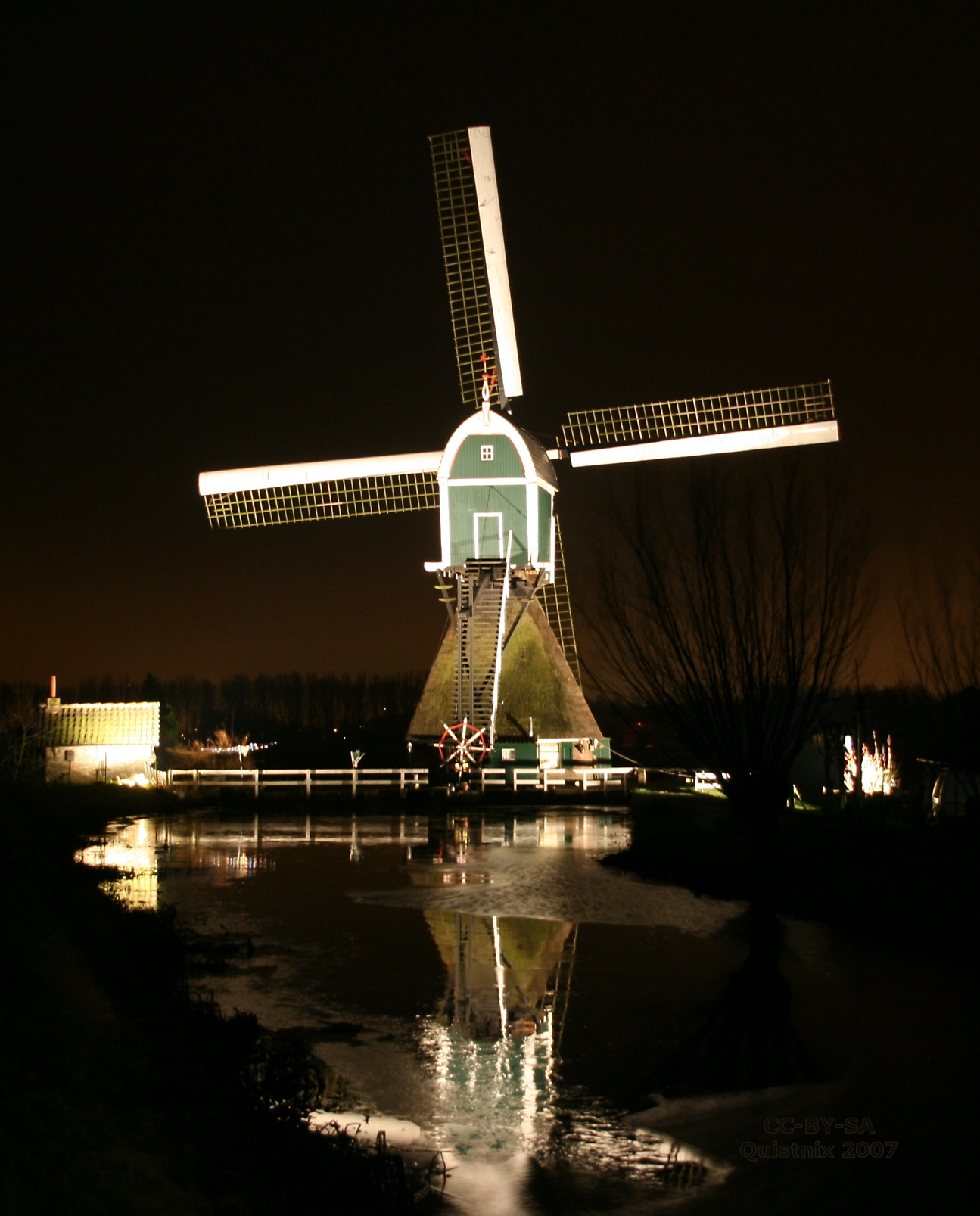
Water Mill 'De Wingerdse Molen'
