= Streefkerk =

- Town
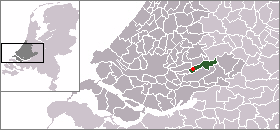

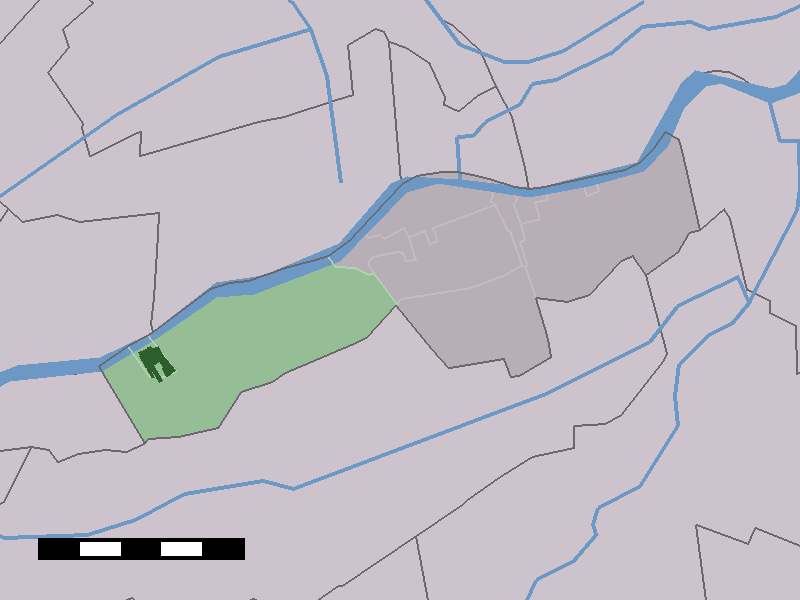
- The town centre (dark green) and the statistical district (light green) of Streefkerk in the former municipality of Liesveld.
- Coordinates: 51.54°N 4.45°E
- Country: Netherlands
- Province: South Holland
- Municipality: Molenlanden

Population (1 January 2004)
  - Total: 2,600
- Postal code: 2959
- Area code: 0184
- Major roads: N216

Streefkerk is a town in the Dutch province of South Holland. It is a part of the municipality of Molenlanden, and lies on the southside of the river Lek, about 20 kilometres east of Rotterdam.

In 2004, the town of Streefkerk had 2600 inhabitants. The built-up area of the town was 0.37 km^{2}, and contained 628 residences. The statistical area "Streefkerk", which also can include the surrounding countryside, has a population of around 2,600.

Streefkerk was a separate municipality until 1986, when it became part of Liesveld. The latter has been part of Molenwaard since 2013.

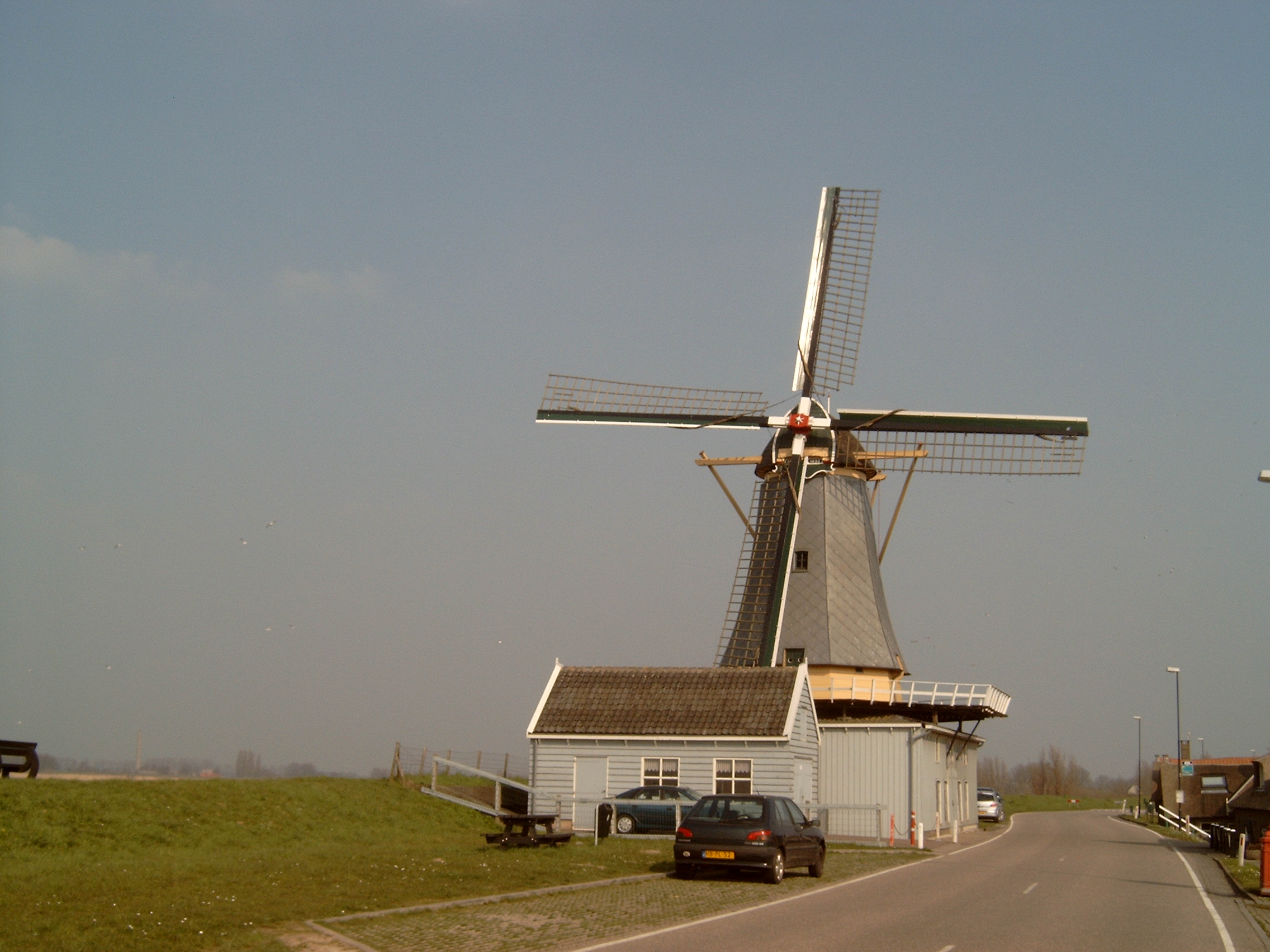
Windmill De Liefde

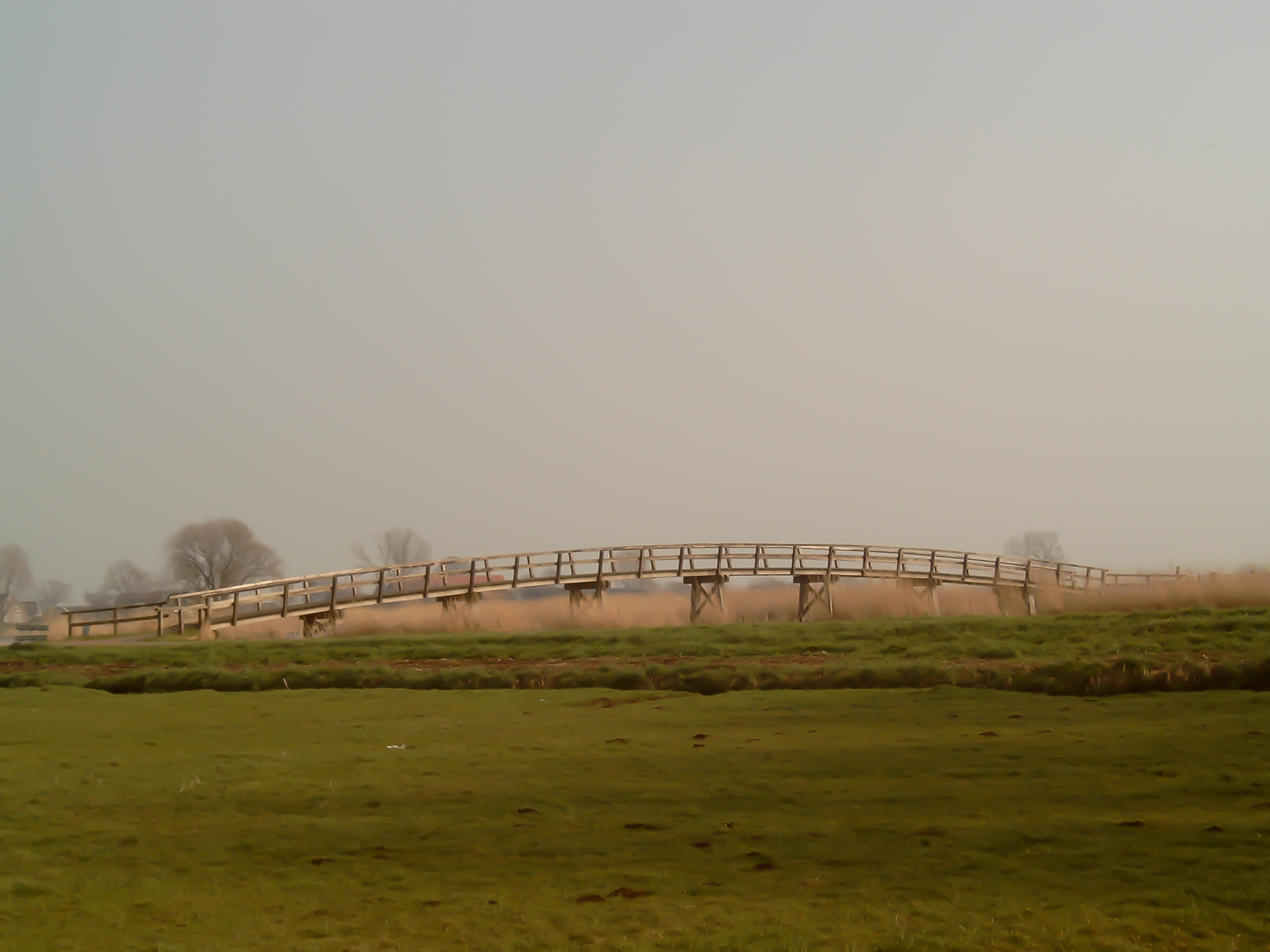
Cycle bridge
