= Provincial road N305 (Netherlands) =

Highway in the Netherlands

Provincial highway 305
- Provinciale weg 305
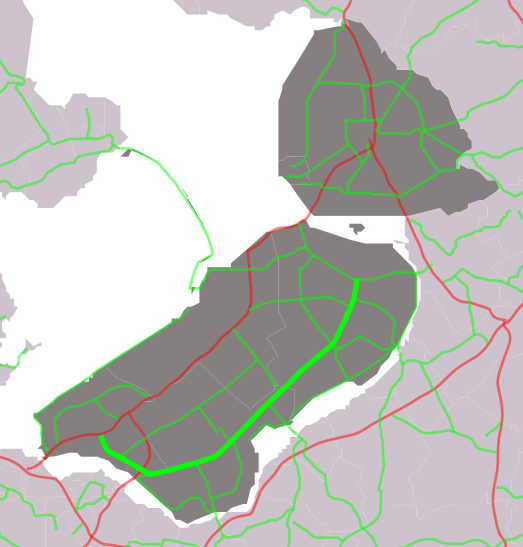

Major junctions
- South end: A 6 in Almere
- N 706 in Almere; A 27 near Almere; N 704 near Almere; N 301 near Zeewolde; N 705 in Zeewolde; N 302 near Biddinghuizen; N 710 in Biddinghuizen; N 309 in Dronten

- North end: N 307 in Dronten

Location
- Country: Kingdom of the Netherlands
- Constituent country: Netherlands
- Provinces: Flevoland
- Municipalities: Almere, Zeewolde Dronten

Highway system
- Roads in the Netherlands; Motorways; E-roads; Provincial; City routes

Provincial road N305 (N305) is a road connecting Rijksweg 6 (A6) in Almere with N307 in Dronten. It is part of Fleovland's notably efficient road network, which allows for easy access to provincial municipalities by car or bus. The road is, for the most part, an expressway with two lanes in each direction; only the section between the N302 and the N309 has a single lane per direction.

== History ==
From 1985, when the Waterlandseweg was opened, until the opening of the A27 between Huizen and the Almere interchange in 1999, the section between the Almere Stad interchange on the A6 and the Zeewolde interchange on the A27 formed part of national road 27 and was designated N27. Between 2015 and the end of 2017, this section was upgraded to 2×2 lanes. The maximum speed limit on this stretch remained 80 km/h. In 2025, the carpool facility beneath the Stichtsebrug on the Waterlandseweg in Almere was expanded.
