= Provincial road N302 (Netherlands) =

Highway in the Netherlands

Provincial highway 302
- Provinciale weg 302
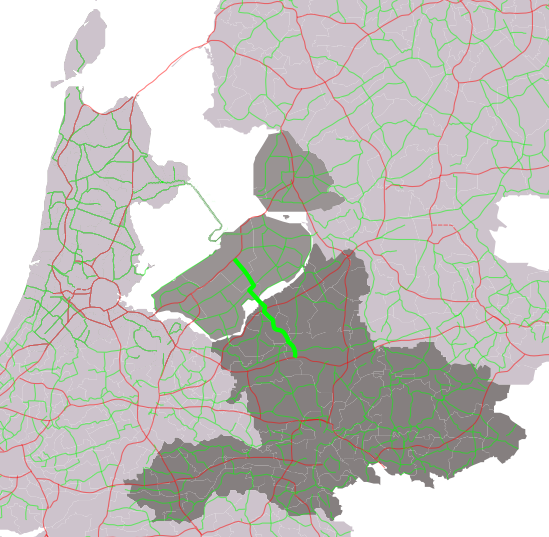

Route information
- Maintained by the provinces of North Holland, Flevoland and Gelderland
- Length: 97 km (60 mi)

Major junctions
- North end: E22 / A 7 in Hoorn
- N 240 near Hoogkarspel; A 6 / N 307 in Lelystad; A 6 / N 309 in Lelystad; N 305 near Biddinghuizen; N 306 / N 707 near Zeewolde; E232 / A 28 in Harderwijk; N 310 near Garderen; N 344 near Apeldoorn
- South end: E30 / A 1 near Kootwijk

Location
- Country: Kingdom of the Netherlands
- Constituent country: Netherlands
- Provinces: North Holland, Flevoland, Gelderland

Highway system
- Roads in the Netherlands; Motorways; E-roads; Provincial; City routes
← N 301	→ N 303

Provincial road N302 (N302) is a road connecting Rijksweg 7 (A7) / European route E22 (E 22) in Hoorn with A1 / E 30 near Kootwijk.

== Major intersections ==
Province	Municipality	km	mi	Destinations	Notes
North Holland	Medemblik	0.000	0.000	E22 / A 7 – Hoorn, Wognum	
North Holland	Medemblik			N 240 north (Markerwaardweg) – Wervershoof, Medemblik	
North Holland	Enkhuizen			N 506 west – Bovenkarspel, Hoorn	
Flevoland	Lelystad			A 6 / N 307 east (Overijsselseweg) – Swifterbant, Dronten	
Flevoland	Lelystad	Gap in route			
Flevoland	Lelystad			A 6 / N 309 north–west (Larserweg) – Lelystad	
Flevoland	Lelystad			N 706 (Vogelweg) – Almere	
Flevoland	Zeewolde			N 305 north–east (Gooiseweg) – Biddinghuizen	Northern end of N305 concurrency
Flevoland	Zeewolde			N 305 south–west (Gooiseweg) – Zeewolde	Southern end of N305 concurrency
Flevoland	Zeewolde			N 306 (Harderdijk) / N 707 (Knardijk) – Elburg, Zeewolde	
Gelderland	Harderwijk			E232 / A 28 – Harderwijk, Nunspeet	
Gelderland	Harderwijk			N 796 west (Leuvenumseweg) – Ermelo	
Gelderland	Ermelo			N 310 east (Garderenseweg) / Garderenseweg west – Garderen, Uddel	Northern end of N310 concurrency
Gelderland	Apeldoorn			N 310 west / N 344 (Amersfoortseweg) – Apeldoorn, Garderen	Southern end of N310 concurrency
Gelderland	Apeldoorn			E30 / A 1 – Apeldoorn, Stroe, Kootwijk	
1.000 mi = 1.609 km; 1.000 km = 0.621 mi: Concurrency terminus
