= Provincial road N307 (Netherlands) =

Highway in the Netherlands

Provincial highway 307
- Provinciale weg 307
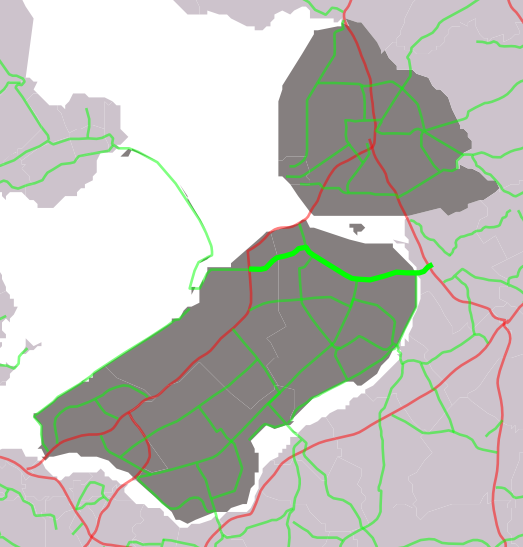

Route information
- Length: 35.2 km (21.9 mi)

Major junctions
- West end: A 6 / N 302 near Lelystad

- N 710 near Swifterbant; N 711 near Dronten; N 305 in Dronten; N 306 near Dronten
- East end: N 50 in Kampen

Location
- Country: Kingdom of the Netherlands
- Constituent country: Netherlands
- Provinces: Flevoland, Overijssel
- Municipalities: Lelystad, Dronten, Kampen

Highway system
- Roads in the Netherlands; Motorways; E-roads; Provincial; City routes

Provincial road N307 (N307) is a road connecting Rijksweg 6 (A6) and N302 near Lelystad with Rijksweg 50 (N50) in Kampen.

== Exit list ==
Province	Municipality	km	mi	Destinations	Notes
Flevoland	Lelystad	8.9	5.5	A 6 / N 302 west (Houtribweg) – Emmeloord, Almere, Lelystad, Enkhuizen	
Flevoland	Dronten	15.6	9.7	N 710 (Bisonweg) – Biddinghuizen, Swifterbant	
Flevoland	Dronten	20.1– 20.6	12.5– 12.8	N 711 northwest (Dronterringweg) – Swifterbant, Emmeloord	
Flevoland	Dronten	23.8	14.8	N 305 south (Biddingringweg) – Dronten, Biddinghuizen	
Flevoland	Dronten	27.3	17.0	Ketelweg	
Flevoland	Dronten	29.2	18.1	Roggebotweg	
Flevoland	Dronten	31.9	19.8	N 306 south (Drontermeerdijk) / Vossemeerdijk – Elburg	
Vossemeer / Drontermeer		32.0	19.9	Roggebot sluice	
Overijssel	Kampen	32.2– 33.0	20.0– 20.5	Flevoweg / Reeveweg	
Overijssel	Kampen	33.9	21.1	Buitendijksweg	
Overijssel	Kampen	34.5	21.4	Schansdijk / Flevoweg	
Overijssel	Kampen	34.9	21.7	N 50 – Emmeloord, Lemmer, Zwolle, Kampen	
Overijssel	Kampen	35.2	21.9	Zambonistraat / Flevoweg	
1.000 mi = 1.609 km; 1.000 km = 0.621 mi
