= Provincial road N710 (Netherlands) =

Road in the Netherlands

Provincial highway 710
- Provinciale weg 710
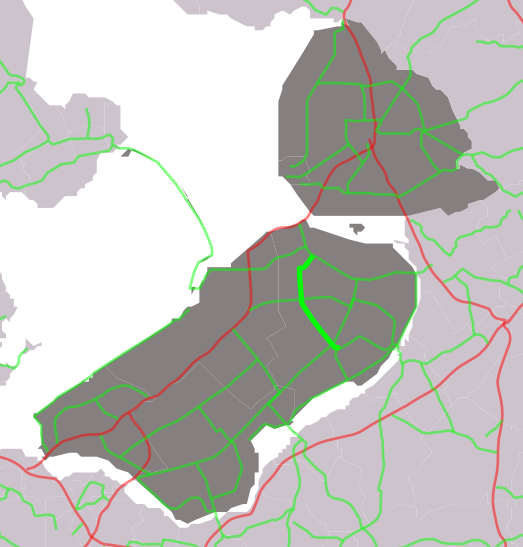

Major junctions
- North end: N 711 in Swifterbant
- South end: N 305 in Biddinghuizen

Location
- Country: Kingdom of the Netherlands
- Constituent country: Netherlands
- Provinces: Flevoland
- Municipalities: Dronten

Highway system
- Roads in the Netherlands; Motorways; E-roads; Provincial; City routes

Provincial road N710 (N710) is a road connecting N711 in Swifterbant with N305 in Biddinghuizen.
