= A6 motorway (Netherlands) =

Motorway in the Netherlands

A6 motorway
- Rijksweg 6
- Location of the A6 motorway

Location
- Country: Kingdom of the Netherlands
- Constituent country: Netherlands

Highway system
- Roads in the Netherlands; Motorways; E-roads; Provincial; City routes

The A6 motorway is a motorway in the Netherlands. It is just over 100 kilometers in length and it connects the A1 motorway at interchange Muiderberg with the A7 motorway at interchange Joure.

== Overview ==
Just after its start at interchange Muiderberg and the first exit, the A6 motorway crosses the bridge Hollandsebrug. Next, it passes the city of Almere, which has a total of six exits and an interchange (interchange Almere to the A27 motorway). Further to the northeast, just after Lelystad, the road crosses the Ketelbrug bridge to the Noordoostpolder and connects to highway N50 at the interchange Emmeloord. After this interchange, the road goes north to the city of Joure, where it connects to the A7 motorway using a semi-directional T interchange.

The A6 motorway, of which the largest part is located in the province of Flevoland, is the shortest route between the city of Amsterdam and most parts of the northern provinces of Friesland and Groningen.

== Hollandsebrug ==
In April 2007, it was announced that the bridge Hollandsebrug, the bridge between intersection Muiderberg and the city of Almere, did not meet the quality and safety standards. The Dutch research organization TNO found out that heavy trucks could cause holes to appear in the road surface. Therefore, as of April 27 of that year, heavy traffic was not allowed to cross the bridge in either direction, and was forced to use the A1 and A27 motorways instead, a detour of about 20 kilometers.

== Exit list ==
Province	Municipality	km	mi	Exit	Destinations	Notes
North Holland	Muiden	42	26	—	A 1 – Muiden, Naarden	
North Holland	Naarden	43	27	1	IJsselmeerweg	
Flevoland	Almere	46	29	2	N 701 northwest (Poortdreef) / Elementendreef – Almere Poort	
Flevoland	Almere	48	30	3	N 702 north / S 101 north – Almere Stad-West	
Flevoland	Almere	51	32	4	S 102 – Almere Haven, Almere Stad-West	
Flevoland	Almere	53	33	5	N 305 north / S 103 south – Almere Stad, Vogelhorst	
Flevoland	Almere	56	35	6	N 703 northwest / S 104 northwest – Almere Stad-Oost, Almere Buiten-West	
Flevoland	Almere	57	35	—	A 27 southeast – Vogelhorst, Huizen	
Flevoland	Almere	59	37	7	S 105 northwest – Almere Buiten	
Flevoland	Almere	61	38	8	N 702 northwest (Buitenring) / S 106 northwest (Buitenring) – Almere Buiten-Oost	
Flevoland	Lelystad	75	47	10	N 309 northwest / N 302 – Harderwijk, Lelystad	
Flevoland	Lelystad	87	54	11	N 302 west (Houtribweg) / N 307 east (Houtribweg) – Lelystad, Swifterbant, Dronten	
Flevoland	Dronten	98	61	12	N 711 southeast – Swifterbant	Westbound exit and eastbound entrance only
Flevoland	Urk	103	64	13	N 352 – Urk, Nagele, Ens	
Flevoland	Noordoostpolder	109	68	14	N 717 – Emmeloord	
Flevoland	Noordoostpolder	111– 280	69– 170	—	N 50 southeast – Ens, Kampen	
Flevoland	Noordoostpolder	283	176	15	N 331 east / N 351 – Marknesse, Emmeloord	
Flevoland	Noordoostpolder	287	178	16	N 715 – Bant, Luttelgeest, Kuinre	
Friesland	Lemsterland	297	185	17	N 359 west (Rondweg) / N 712 southwest (Zeedijk) – Lemmer	
Friesland	Lemsterland	300	190	18	N 354 northwest (Herenweg) / N 924 east (Herenweg) – Oosterzee-Gietersebrug, Woudsend	
Friesland	Scharsterland	305	190	19	N 927 west – Sint Nicolaasga	
Friesland	Scharsterland	311	193	—	A 7 / Geert Knolweg – Joure, Heerenveen, Sneek	
1.000 mi = 1.609 km; 1.000 km = 0.621 mi: Incomplete access
