= Provincial road N306 (Netherlands) =

Highway in the Netherlands

Provincial highway 306
- Provinciale weg 306
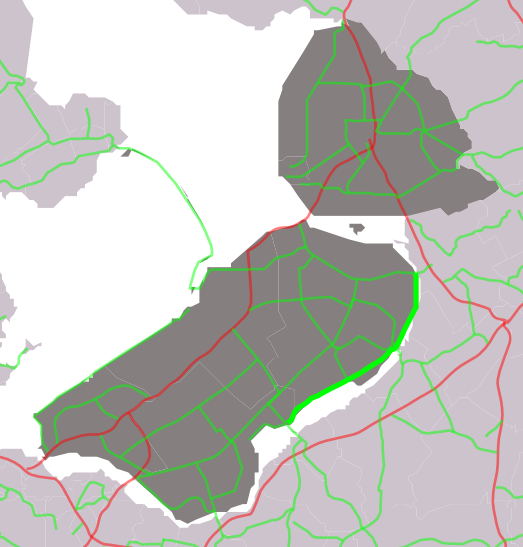

Major junctions
- North end: N 307 near Dronten

- N 309 near Elburg; N 708 near Biddinghuizen

- South end: N 302 / N 707 near Harderwijk

Location
- Country: Kingdom of the Netherlands
- Constituent country: Netherlands
- Provinces: Flevoland
- Municipalities: Dronten, Zeewolde

Highway system
- Roads in the Netherlands; Motorways; E-roads; Provincial; City routes

Provincial road N306 (N306) is a road connecting N307 near Dronten with Provincial road N302 (Netherlands) and Provincial road N707 (Netherlands) near Harderwijk.
