= Larsen (Flevoland) =

Larsen was a town planned to be built on the Flevopolder in the Dutch province of Flevoland, on the territory of the contemporary municipality of Lelystad.

Originally, the Netherlands wanted to organize Eastern Flevoland like the Noordoostpolder: one medium-sized core and several smaller villages around it. In 1955, there were at least 11 villages planned, in addition to the capital Lelystad, including Larsen. In the 1950s, however, car ownership exploded; it was assumed that everyone would eventually own a car. As a result, greater distances could be bridged and the setup with many population centres within cycling distance of a larger centre would become redundant. In 1959 the number of villages was reduced to five: Dronten, Biddinghuizen, Swifterbant, Larsen and Zeewolde. Zeewolde was also scrapped in 1963; the name was later used for a town and municipality in Southern Flevoland. In 1965, Larsen was eventually scrapped shortly before construction began. This meant that, besides Lelystad, the polder would have only three villages.

However the name Larsen has left its mark and was used for a hamlet in the region with a population of 200 in 1971. Nowadays it lends its name to a road named Larserweg, a canal named Larservaart and a forest named Larserbos. In southern Lelystad there are also the business parks of Larserpoort and Larserplein.
