= Provincial road N708 (Netherlands) =

Road in the Netherlands

Provincial highway 708
- Provinciale weg 708
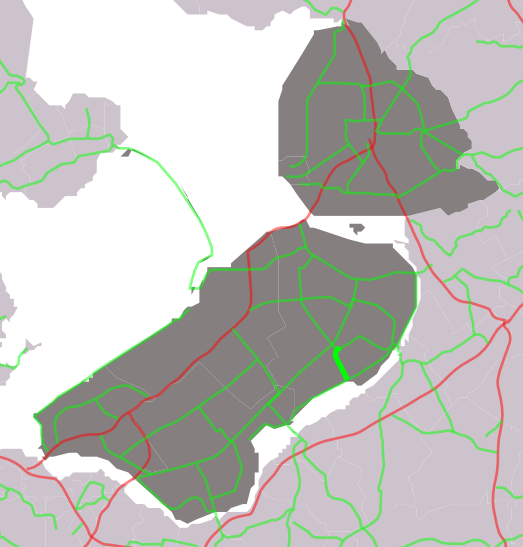

Major junctions
- North end: N 709 in Biddinghuizen

- South end: N 306 near Biddinghuizen

Location
- Country: Kingdom of the Netherlands
- Constituent country: Netherlands
- Provinces: Flevoland
- Municipalities: Dronten

Highway system
- Roads in the Netherlands; Motorways; E-roads; Provincial; City routes

Provincial road N708 (N708) is a road connecting N709 near Biddinghuizen with N306 near Biddinghuizen.
