= Provincial road N709 (Netherlands) =

Road in the Netherlands

Provincial highway 709
- Provinciale weg 709
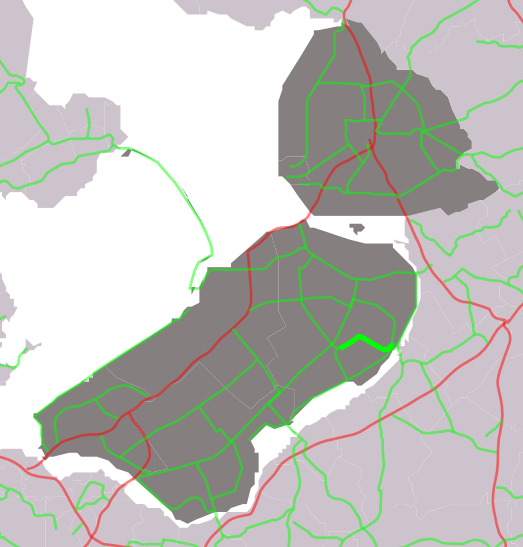

Major junctions
- West end: N 708 in Biddinghuizen

- East end: N 309 near Elburg

Location
- Country: Kingdom of the Netherlands
- Constituent country: Netherlands
- Provinces: Flevoland
- Municipalities: Dronten

Highway system
- Roads in the Netherlands; Motorways; E-roads; Provincial; City routes

Provincial road N709 (N709) is a road connecting N708 in Biddinghuizen with N309 near Elburg.
