= Where the Sheep Sleep =

Dutch festival

Where the Sheep Sleep (Dutch: Waar de Schapen Slapen) is an official Burning Man summer event held annually in the Netherlands since 2016.

Due to opposition from local organisations and the public, the event was moved from Apeldoorn to Zeewolde in 2019. The event has been held over the years in Kootwijk, Apeldoorn and Zeewolde.
