= Provincial road N711 (Netherlands) =

Road in Flevoland, Netherlands

Provincial highway 711
- Provinciale weg 711
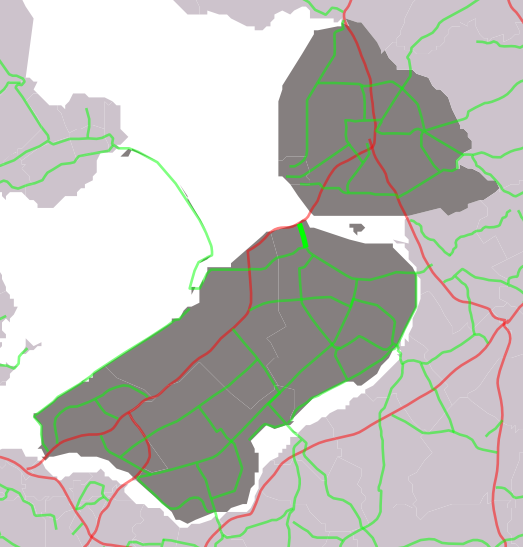

Major junctions
- North end: A 6 near Swifterbant
- South end: N 307 in Dronten

Location
- Country: Kingdom of the Netherlands
- Constituent country: Netherlands
- Provinces: Flevoland
- Municipalities: Dronten

Highway system
- Roads in the Netherlands; Motorways; E-roads; Provincial; City routes

Provincial road N711 (N711) is a road connecting Rijksweg 6 (A6) near Swifterbant with N307 in Dronten.
