= N709 =

N709 may refer to:

- N709 an exact equivalent of the thermionic valve EL84
- Provincial road N709 (Netherlands)
- N709 (Bangladesh), the Khulna City Bypass

== See also ==
- N709PA the registration of Pan Am Flight 214 which was destroyed by lightning
