= Provincial road N703 (Netherlands) =

Road in the Netherlands

Provincial highway 703
- Provinciale weg 703
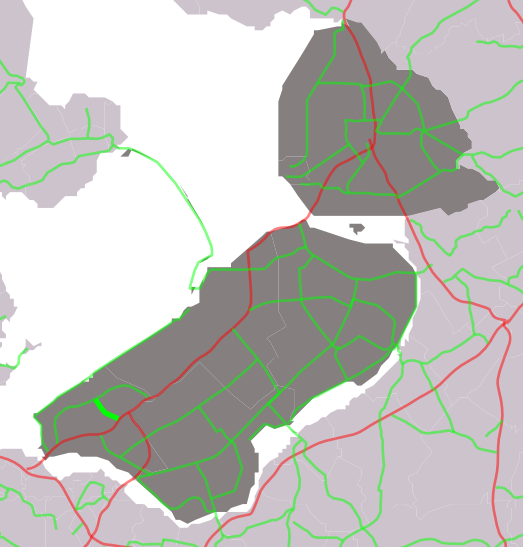

Major junctions
- North end: N 702 / S 101 / S 104 in Almere

- South end: A 6 / S 104 in Almere

Location
- Country: Kingdom of the Netherlands
- Constituent country: Netherlands
- Provinces: Flevoland
- Municipalities: Almere

Highway system
- Roads in the Netherlands; Motorways; E-roads; Provincial; City routes

Provincial road N703 (N703) is a road connecting N702 with Rijksweg 6 (A6) found in Almere.
