= Provincial road N704 (Netherlands) =

Road in the Netherlands

Provincial highway 704
- Provinciale weg 704
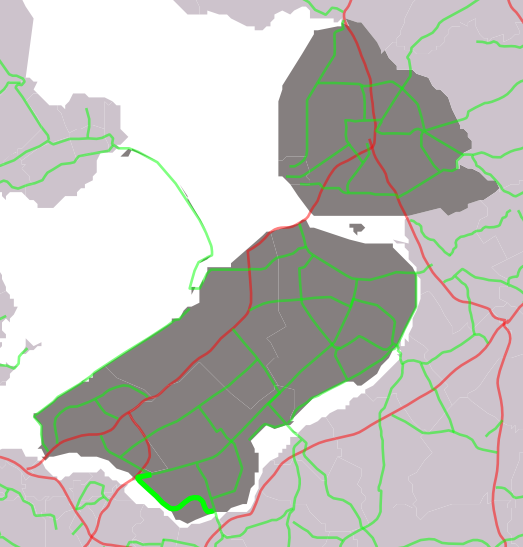

Major junctions
- West end: N 305 near Almere

- East end: N 301 near Nijkerk

Location
- Country: Kingdom of the Netherlands
- Constituent country: Netherlands
- Provinces: Flevoland
- Municipalities: Zeewolde

Highway system
- Roads in the Netherlands; Motorways; E-roads; Provincial; City routes

Provincial road N704 (N704) is a road connecting N305 near Almere with N301 near Nijkerk.
