= Radio Kootwijk =

- Hamlet
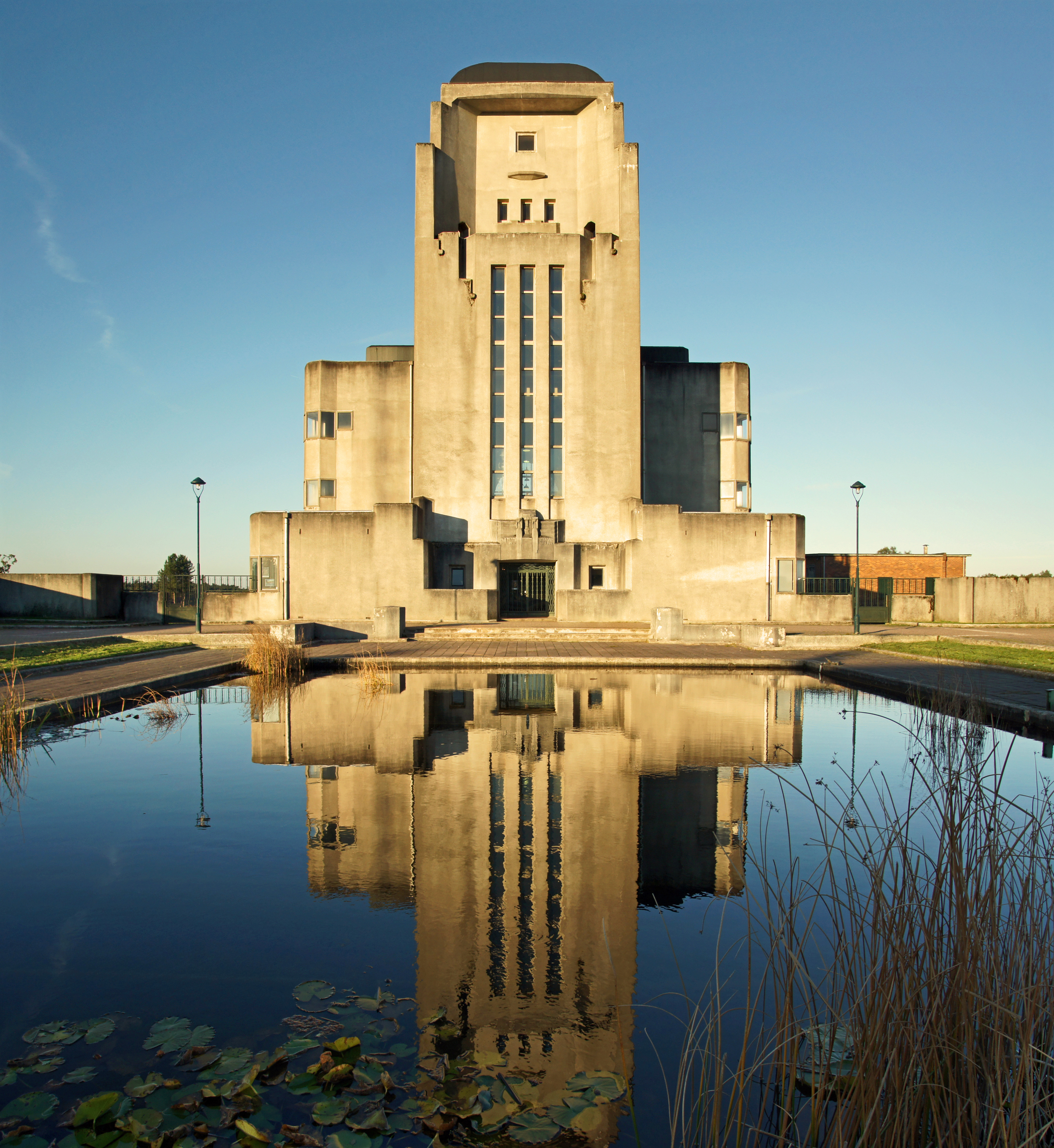
- Building A of Radio Kootwijk

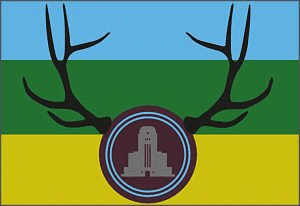
- Flag

- Location within the Netherlands Radio Kootwijk (Netherlands)
- Coordinates: 52°10′35″N 5°49′57″E
- Country: Netherlands
- Province: Gelderland
- Municipality: Apeldoorn

Area
  - Total: 44.37 km^{2} (17.13 sq mi)

Population (2021)
  - Total: 345
  - Density: 7.78/km^{2} (20.1/sq mi)
- Time zone: UTC+1 (CET)
  - Summer (DST): UTC+2 (CEST)
- Postal code: 7348
- Area code: 055

Radio Kootwijk is a hamlet in the Dutch municipality of Apeldoorn. It is situated in a heather and forest rich territory in the Veluwe region, east of the sandhills of the Kootwijkerzand and the town of Kootwijk. Radio Kootwijk has a combined statistical listing with Hoog Soeren, the hamlet consists of about 37 houses. The village is known for its iconic radio transmitter.

== Radio transmitter ==
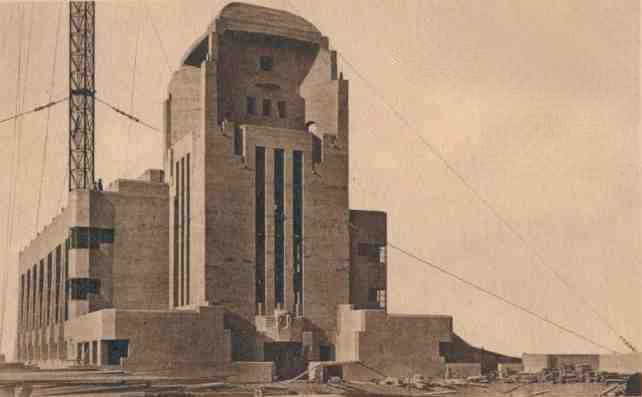
Radio Kootwijk in 1922

The housing accommodations of Radio Kootwijk arose as a result of the building of a shortwave radio transmitter with the same name, starting in 1918. The transmitter played an important role in the 20th century as a communication facility between the Netherlands and its then colony of Dutch East Indies. In 1923 Dutch PTT started trans-oceanic telegraphy using a longwave transmitter (a 400 kW high frequency alternator) from the German Telefunken company under the callsign PCG, on 24 kHz and 48 kHz. By 1925 the longwave transmitter was changed by a shortwave tube based, electronic transmitter which had a much better performance due to the better propagation of short waves. With this new technology, in 1928 a radio-telephonic connection was established. At the end of World War II, the German occupying forces blew up the transmitter. Afterward some of the radio towers were rebuilt.

Due to the development of new technologies like Communications satellites, Radio Kootwijk lost its position as main overseas wireless connection point of the Netherlands. In 1980, the last transmission mast was blown up. In 2004 the park lost its last transmitter functions, and was transferred from the KPN company (successor to PTT) to the State Forestry Service, which started attracting new buyers. The main building of the former transmitter park, designed by Dutch architect Julius Maria Luthmann and named 'Building A', 'The Cathedral' or sometimes 'The Sphynx', was officially appointed as a monument. It is used as venue and scenery for several cultural events and productions, including the American film Mindhunters in 2004.

== Gallery ==
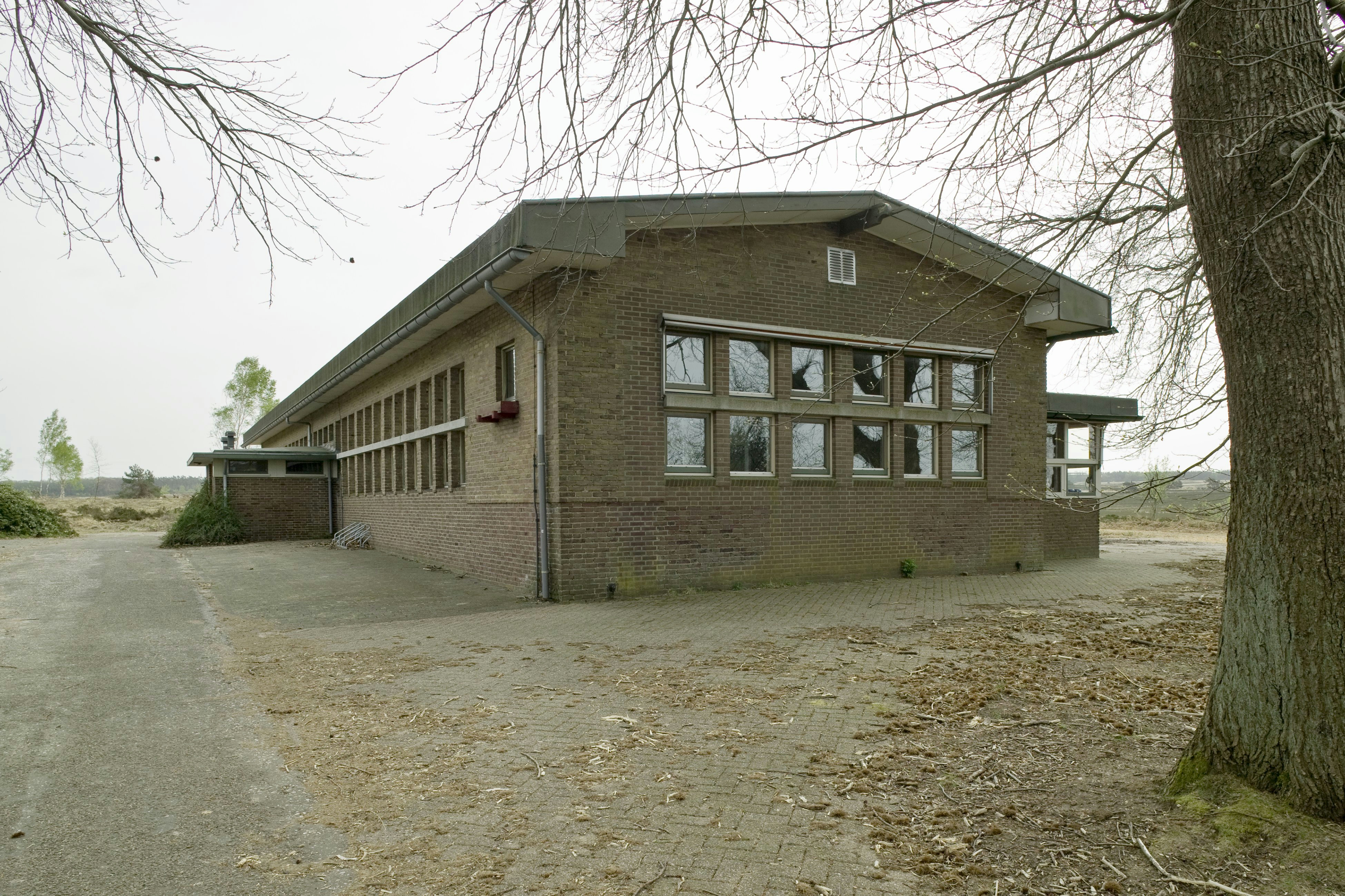
Building C

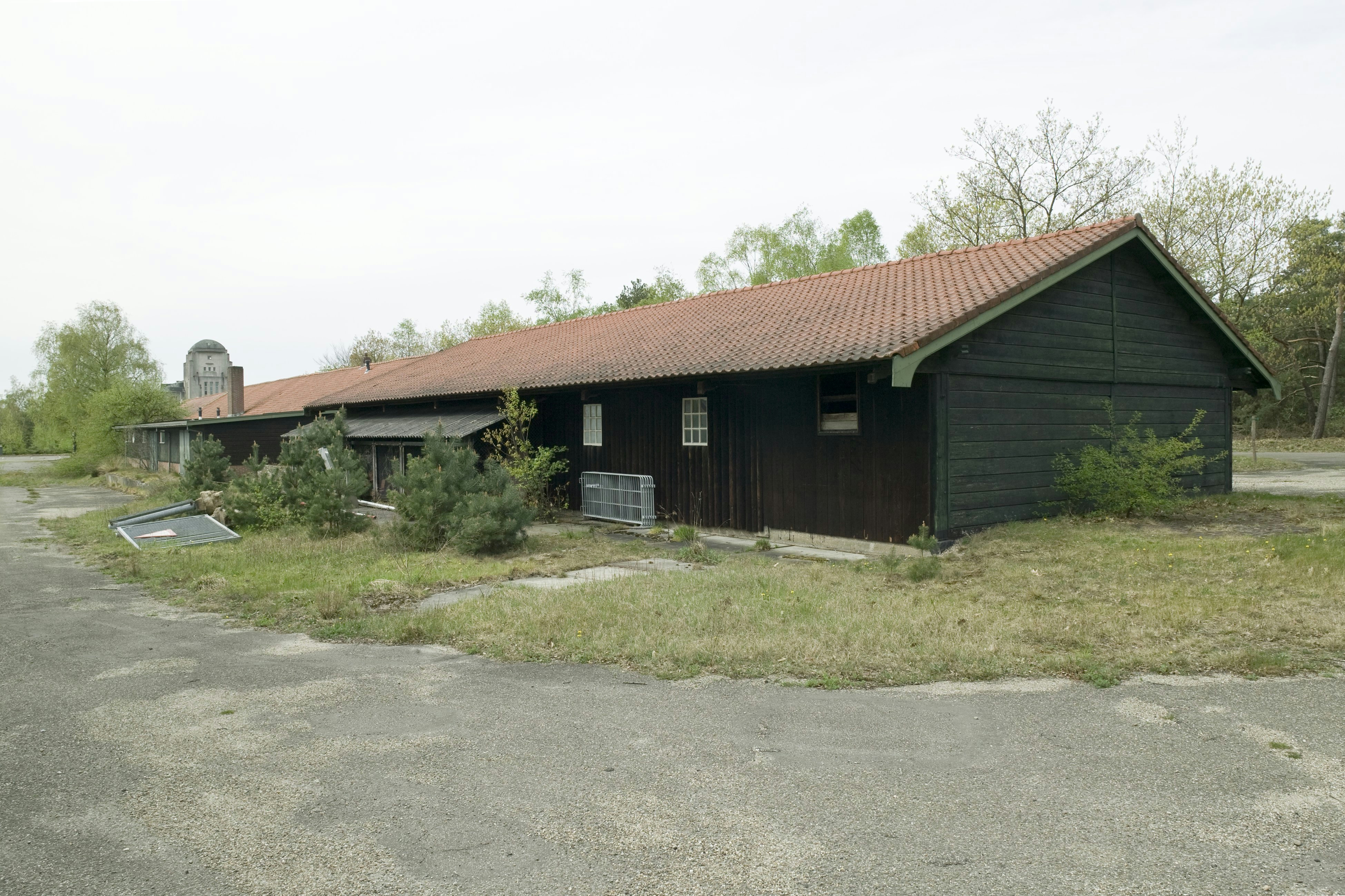
Building P

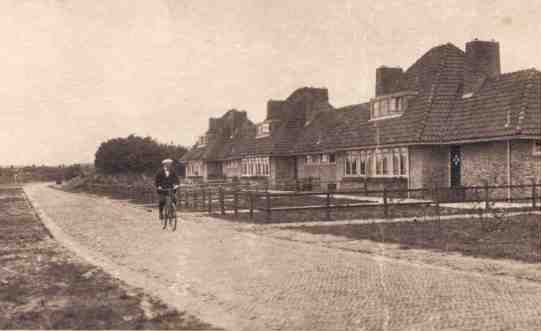
Staff village (1922)

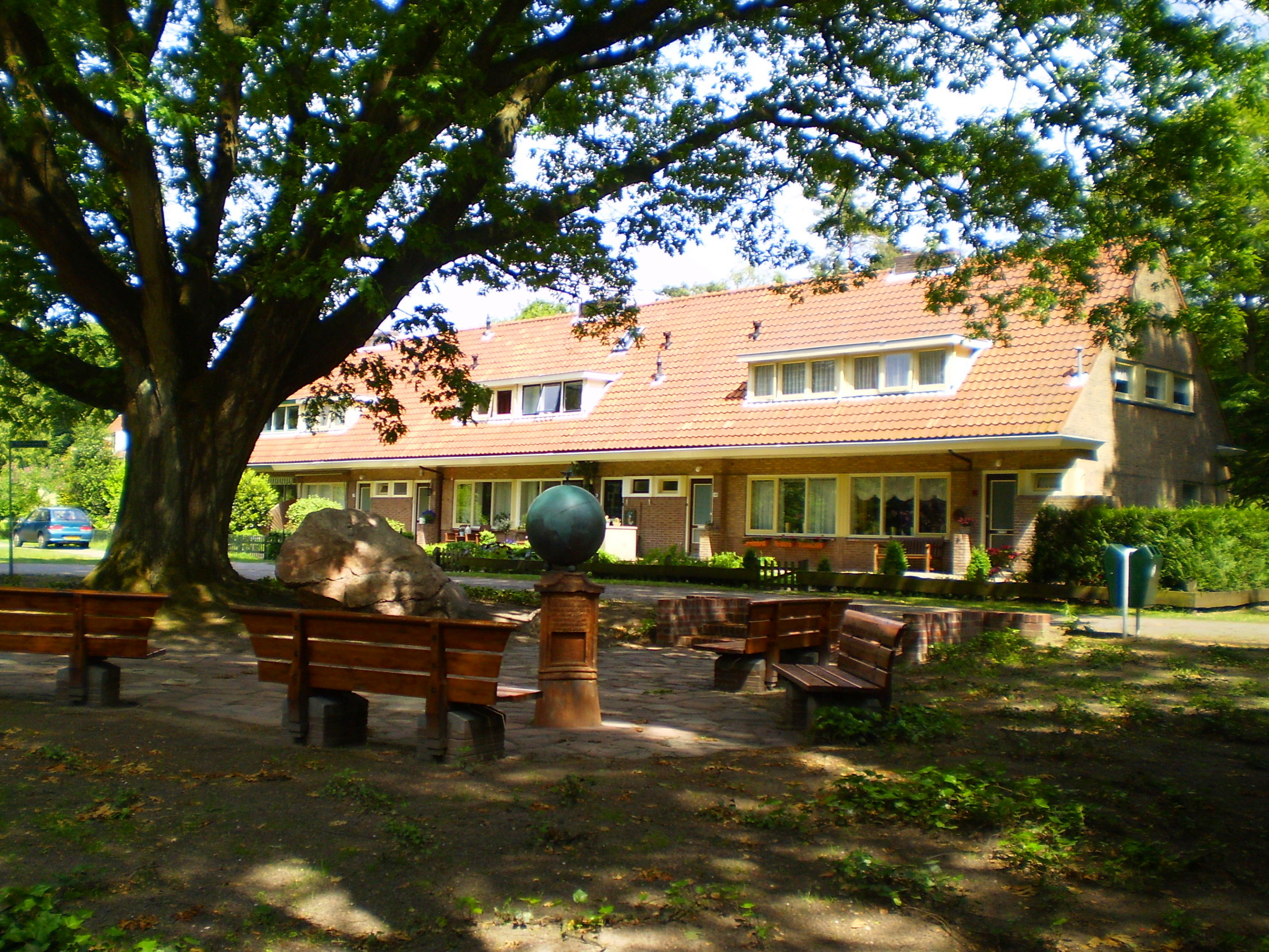
Monument in the village

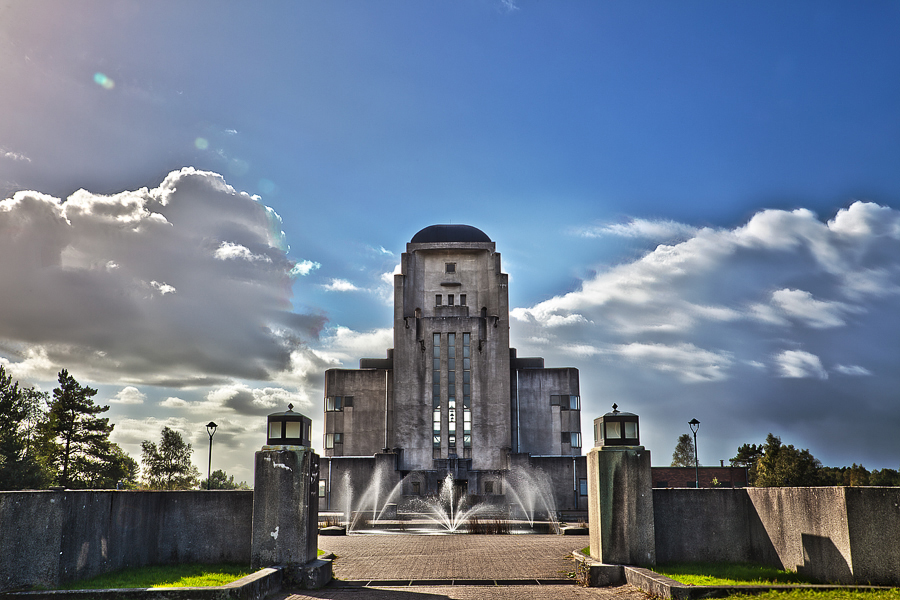
- Front building A

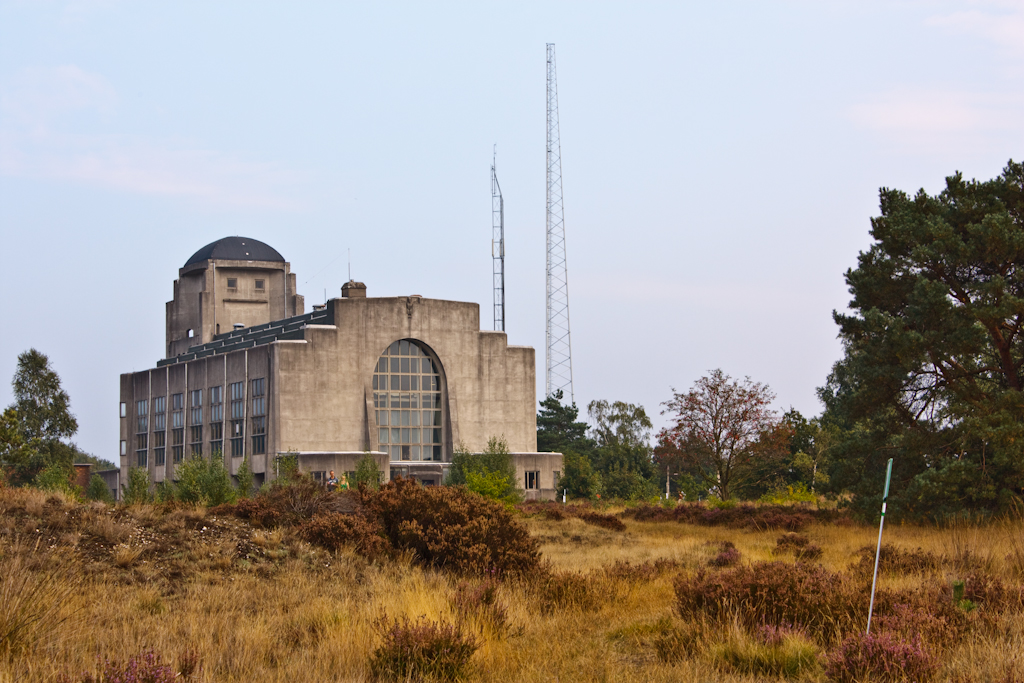
- Rear building A
