= Provincial road N701 (Netherlands) =

Road in the Netherlands

Provincial highway 701
- Provinciale weg 701
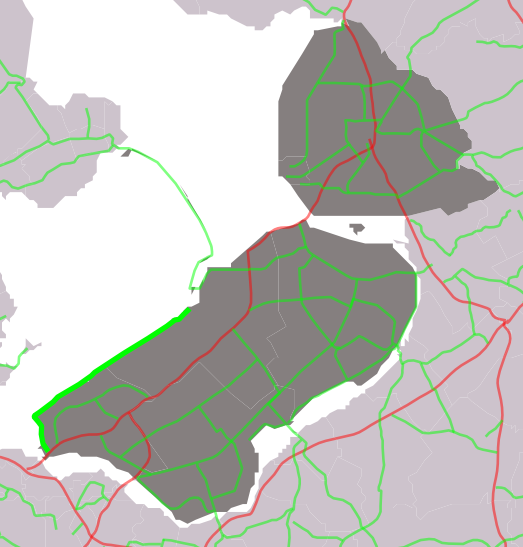

Major junctions
- North end: Lelystad
- South end: A 6 in Almere

Location
- Country: Kingdom of the Netherlands
- Constituent country: Netherlands
- Provinces: Flevoland
- Municipalities: Almere, Lelystad

Highway system
- Roads in the Netherlands; Motorways; E-roads; Provincial; City routes

Provincial road N701 (N701) is a road connecting the city of Lelystad with Rijksweg 6 (A6) in Almere.
