= Provincial road N707 (Netherlands) =

Road in the Netherlands

Provincial highway 707
- Provinciale weg 707
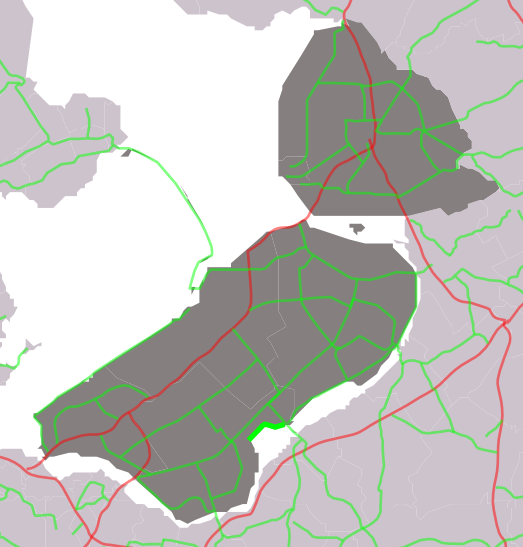

Major junctions
- North end: N 302 / N 306 near Harderwijk
- South end: Zeewolde

Location
- Country: Kingdom of the Netherlands
- Constituent country: Netherlands
- Provinces: Flevoland
- Municipalities: Zeewolde

Highway system
- Roads in the Netherlands; Motorways; E-roads; Provincial; City routes

Provincial road N707 (N707) is a road connecting N306 and N302 near Harderwijk with Zeewolde.

== Exit list ==
Province	Municipality	km	mi	Destinations	Notes
Flevoland	Zeewolde	0.0	0.0	N 302 / N 306 (Harderdijk) / Ganzenpad	
Flevoland	Zeewolde	3.2	2.0	Knardijk	
Flevoland	Zeewolde	7.0	4.3	Kwartiermakerslaan	
1.000 mi = 1.609 km; 1.000 km = 0.621 mi
