= Provincial road N706 (Netherlands) =

Road in the Netherlands

Provincial highway 706
- Provinciale weg 706
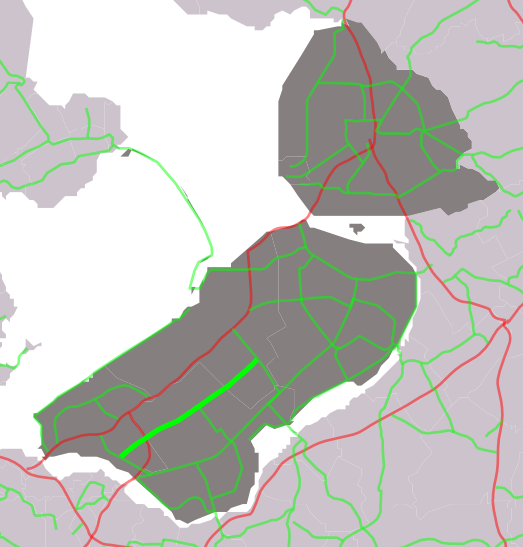

Major junctions
- South end: N 302 near Lelystad

- N 705 in Zeewolde; A 27 near Almere

- North end: N 305 near Almere

Location
- Country: Kingdom of the Netherlands
- Constituent country: Netherlands
- Provinces: Flevoland
- Municipalities: Almere, Zeewolde, Lelystad

Highway system
- Roads in the Netherlands; Motorways; E-roads; Provincial; City routes

Provincial road N706 (N706) is a road connecting N305 near Almere with N302 near Lelystad.
