= Provincial road N310 (Netherlands) =

Road in Gelderland, Netherlands

Provincial highway 310
- Provinciale weg 310
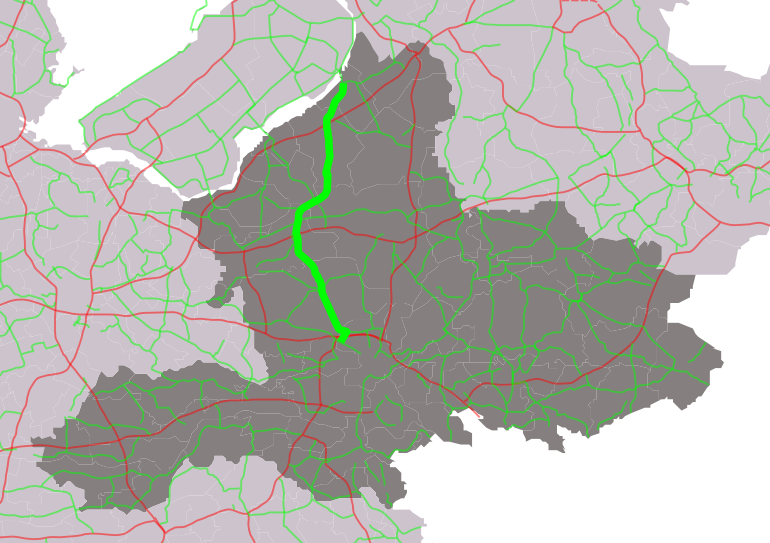

Major junctions
- North end: N 309 in Elburg

- South end: N 224 near Oosterbeek

Location
- Country: Kingdom of the Netherlands
- Constituent country: Netherlands
- Provinces: Gelderland
- Municipalities: Elburg, Nunspeet, Apeldoorn, Garderen, Barneveld, Ede, Arnhem

Highway system
- Roads in the Netherlands; Motorways; E-roads; Provincial; City routes

Provincial road N310 (N310) is a road connecting N309 in Elburg with N224 near Oosterbeek.
