= Dronten railway station =

Railway station in the Netherlands

Dronten
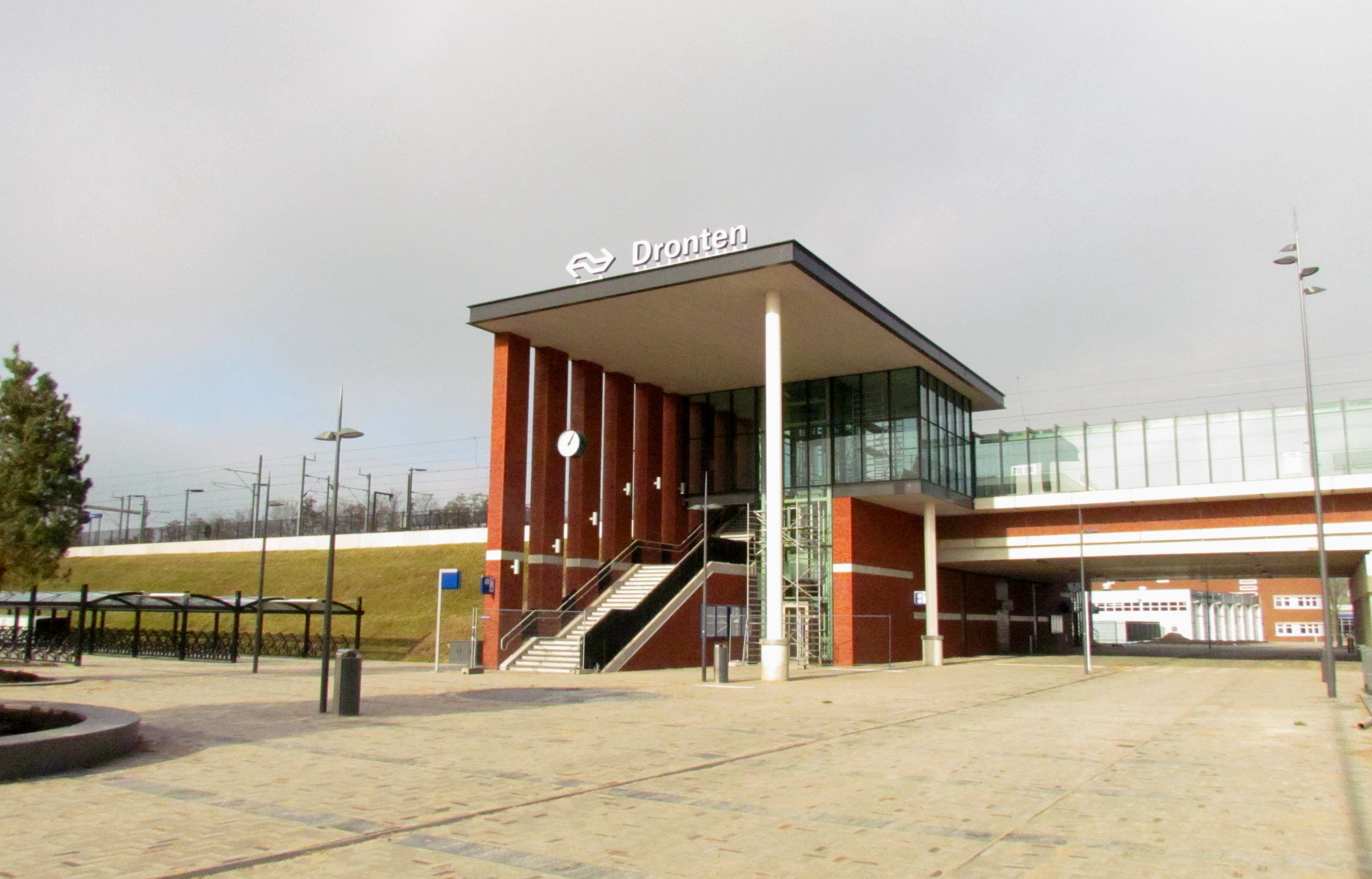

General information
- Location: Netherlands
- Coordinates: 52°32′2″N 5°43′23″E
- Line: Lelystad–Zwolle railway

Other information
- Station code: Dron

History
- Opened: 9 December 2012; 13 years ago
- Closed: -

Services
Preceding station	Nederlandse Spoorwegen	Following station
Lelystad Centrum Terminus	NS Sprinter 9000	Kampen Zuid towards Leeuwarden
Location
- Location within Netherlands

Dronten is a Dutch railway station, on the Lelystad–Zwolle railway, also knowns as the Hanzelijn. The station is located in the north of Dronten.

The station opened on 9 December 2012, with there being 2 platforms and 4 tracks, for passing Intercities from The Hague and Schiphol to Groningen and Leeuwarden. The station is located on a viaduct station at 7 m (23 ft) above street level.

== Train services ==
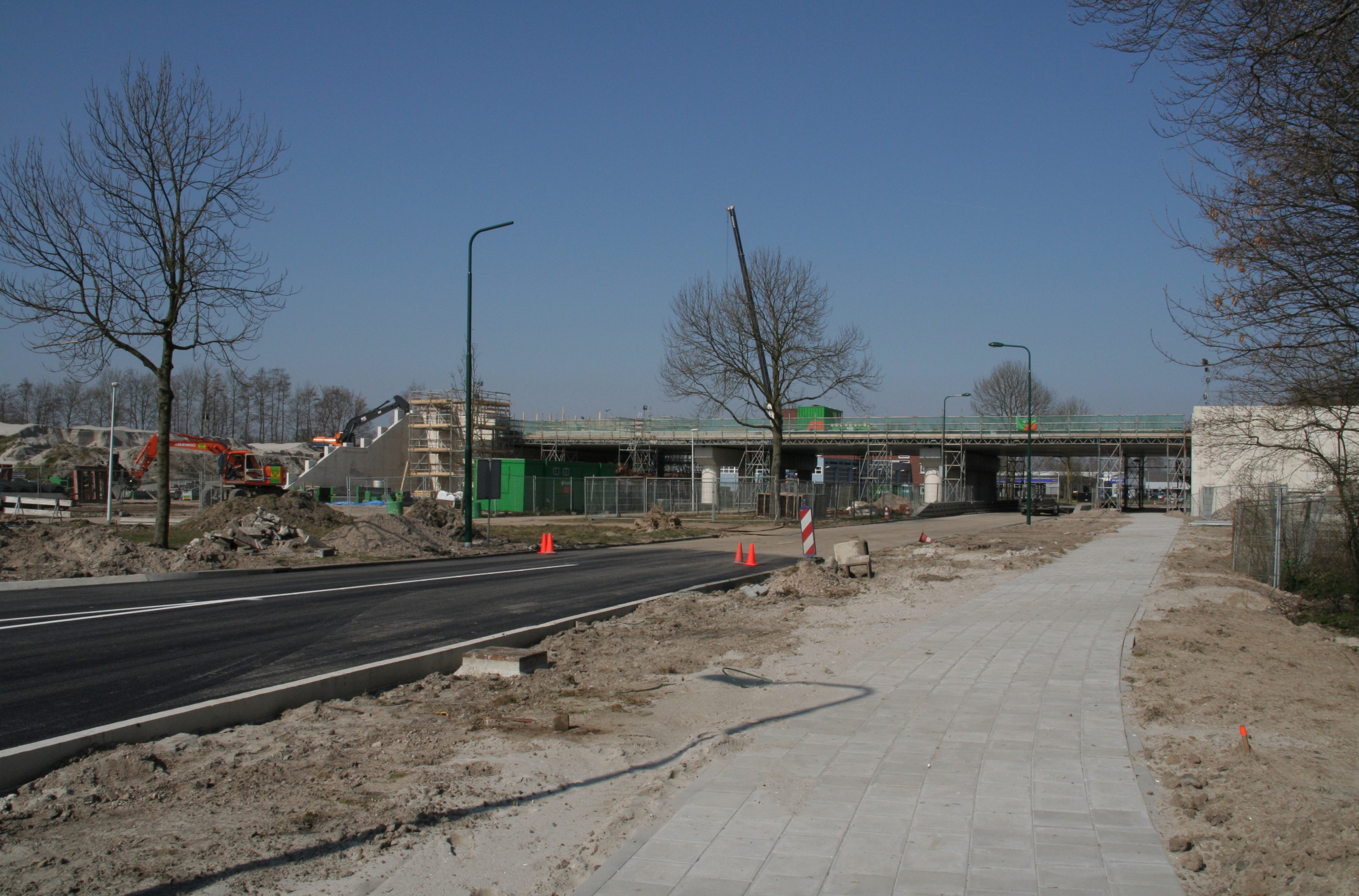
Train station of Dronten under construction (April 2009)

The station is served by the following service(s):

- Local Sprinter services Lelystad Centrum - Zwolle - Meppel - Steenwijk - Heerenveen - Leeuwarden.

Platform 1 for services to Lelystad Centrum, and platform 4 for services to Kampen Zuid, Zwolle, Meppel and further in the direction of Leeuwarden. Platform 2/3 are not accessible and are for passing trains.

== Bus services ==
- (local service) 521/522 to Golfresidentie
- 146: Emmeloord
- 147: Barneveld (via Hardewijk)
- 143: Lelystad

All services are operated by RRReis since the 10th of December 2023
