= Ricardo Talu =

Dutch-Angolan footballer

Personal information
- Date of birth: 21 July 1993 (age 33)
- Place of birth: Luanda, Angola
- Height: 1.80 m (5 ft 11 in)
- Positions: Centre back; midfielder

Team information
- Current team: KHC

Youth career
- Swift '64
- –2012: PEC Zwolle

Senior career*
Years	Team	Apps	(Gls)
2012–2013	PEC Zwolle	1	(0)
2014	Telstar	0	(0)
2015–2016	Albion Rovers	21	(0)
2016–2019	Dronten	?	(?)
2019–	KHC	?	(?)
- * Club domestic league appearances and goals as of 21 March 2021

Ricardo Talu (born 21 July 1993) is a footballer who plays as a centre back for KHC in the Eerste Klasse.

Talu has previously played for Zwolle, Telstar and Scottish side Albion Rovers.

== Career ==
As a youth, Yalu played for Dutch clubs Swift ’64 and Zwolle, before playing senior football with the Bluefingers as well as Telstar.

In July 2015, Talu along with Romario Sabajo went go on trial at Scottish Championship side Greenock Morton with only Sabajo being offered a contract. After leaving Morton, Talu signed up with Coatbridge side Albion Rovers. He played in over 20 matches for Rovers, before leaving the club at the end of the 2015–16 season after his contract expired.

After his release from the Coatbridge side, Talu returned to the Netherlands to sign with lower-league side Dronten in his adopted home town of Dronten. In March 2019, he moved to KHC in the Eerste Klasse.
