= Kootwijk =

- Village
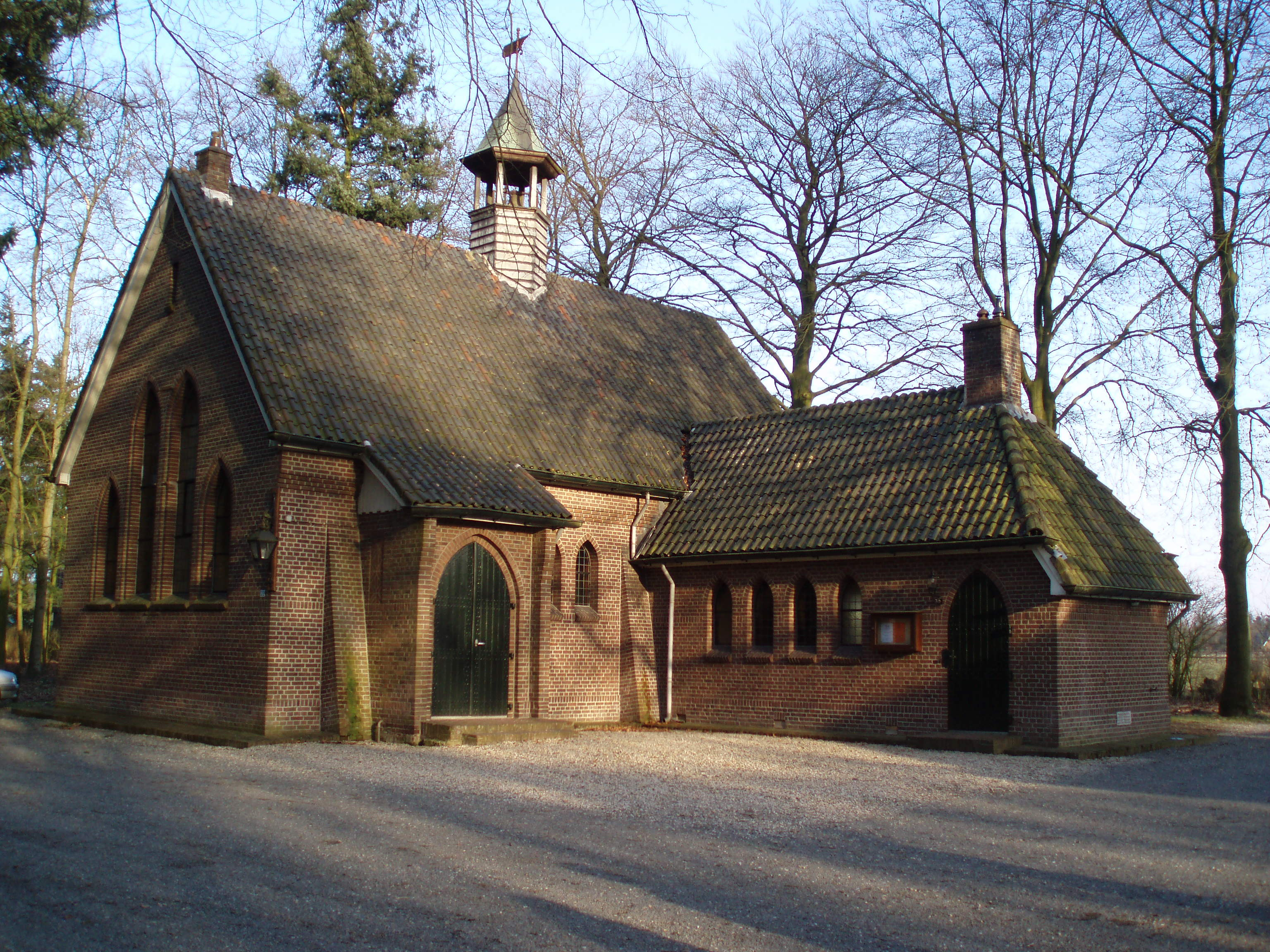
- Church

- Location in the province of Gelderland Kootwijk (Netherlands)
- Coordinates: 52°11′2″N 5°46′23″E
- Country: Netherlands
- Province: Gelderland
- Municipality: Barneveld

Area
  - Total: 32.19 km^{2} (12.43 sq mi)
- Elevation: 29 m (95 ft)

Population (2021)
  - Total: 275
  - Density: 8.54/km^{2} (22.1/sq mi)
- Time zone: UTC+1 (CET)
  - Summer (DST): UTC+2 (CEST)
- Postal code: 3775
- Dialing code: 0577

Kootwijk (West Low German: Kodek) (population estimate: 280) is a small village in the municipality Barneveld, located in the middle of the Netherlands, in the province of Gelderland.

== History ==
It was first mentioned between 1333 and 1334 as Coetwijc, and means "village with little houses". In 1840, it was home to 66 people. The Dutch Reformed Church dates from the 16th century, but has been extensively modified in 1930. Up to 1900, it was surrounded by heath and mainly home to shepherds. South of Kootwijk is the Kootwijkerzand, a sand dune area of 7 km^{2}, the largest in Europe.

Between 1918 and 1921, the radio transmitter Radio Kootwijk was constructed to the east of Kootwijk to improve communication with the Dutch East Indies (nowadays Indonesia). In 1950, the village was hit by an F3-F4 tornado. One person was injured, however 460 hectares (1,100 acres) of forest was destroyed. A living van was turned over three times, however the occupants survived with minor injuries.

== Transportation ==
Kootwijk is bypassed in the north by Rijksweg 1 (A1) / European route E30 (E 30) at exit 18, where Provincial road N302 (N302) branches off to the north.

== Gallery ==
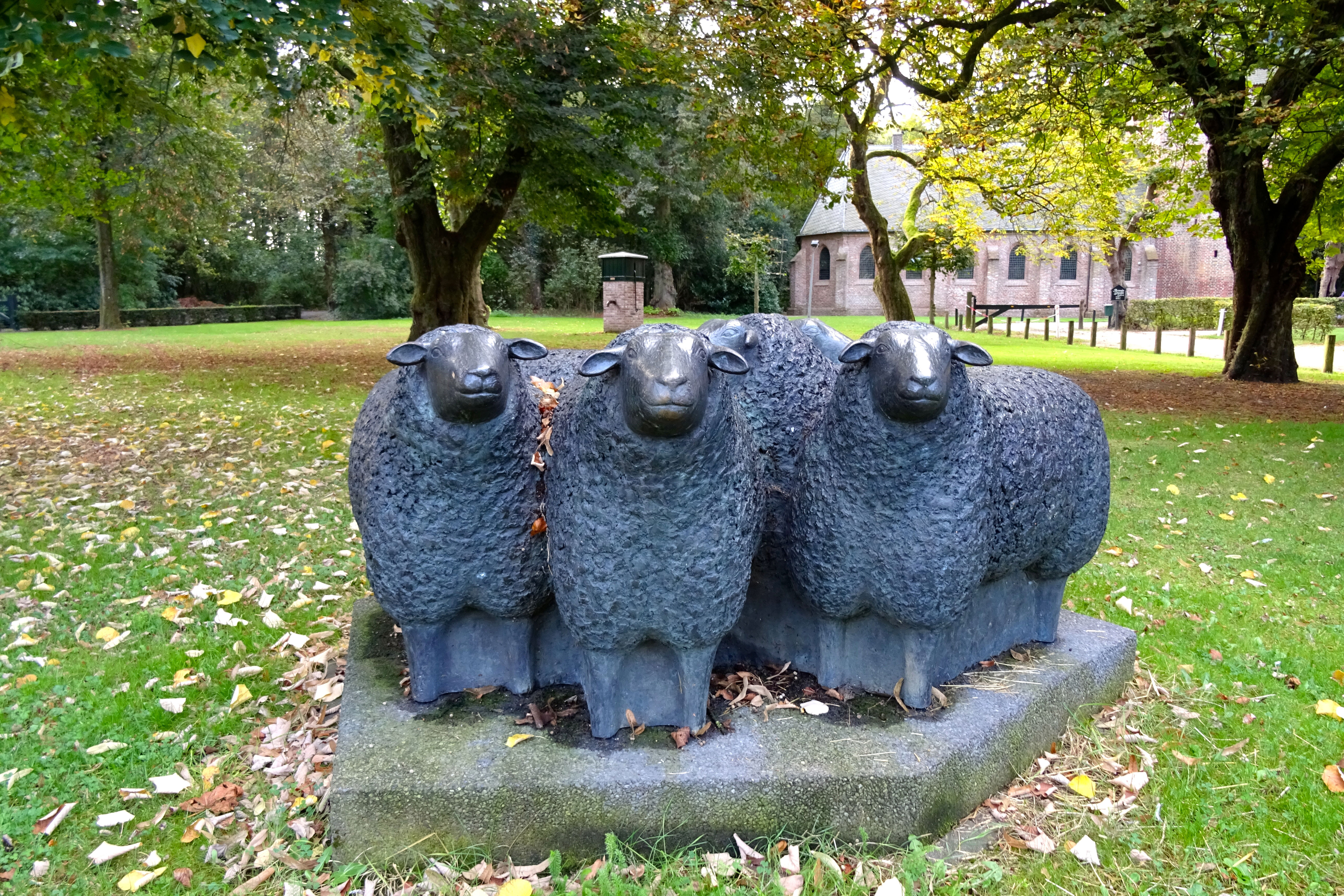
Five sheep by Karin Beek

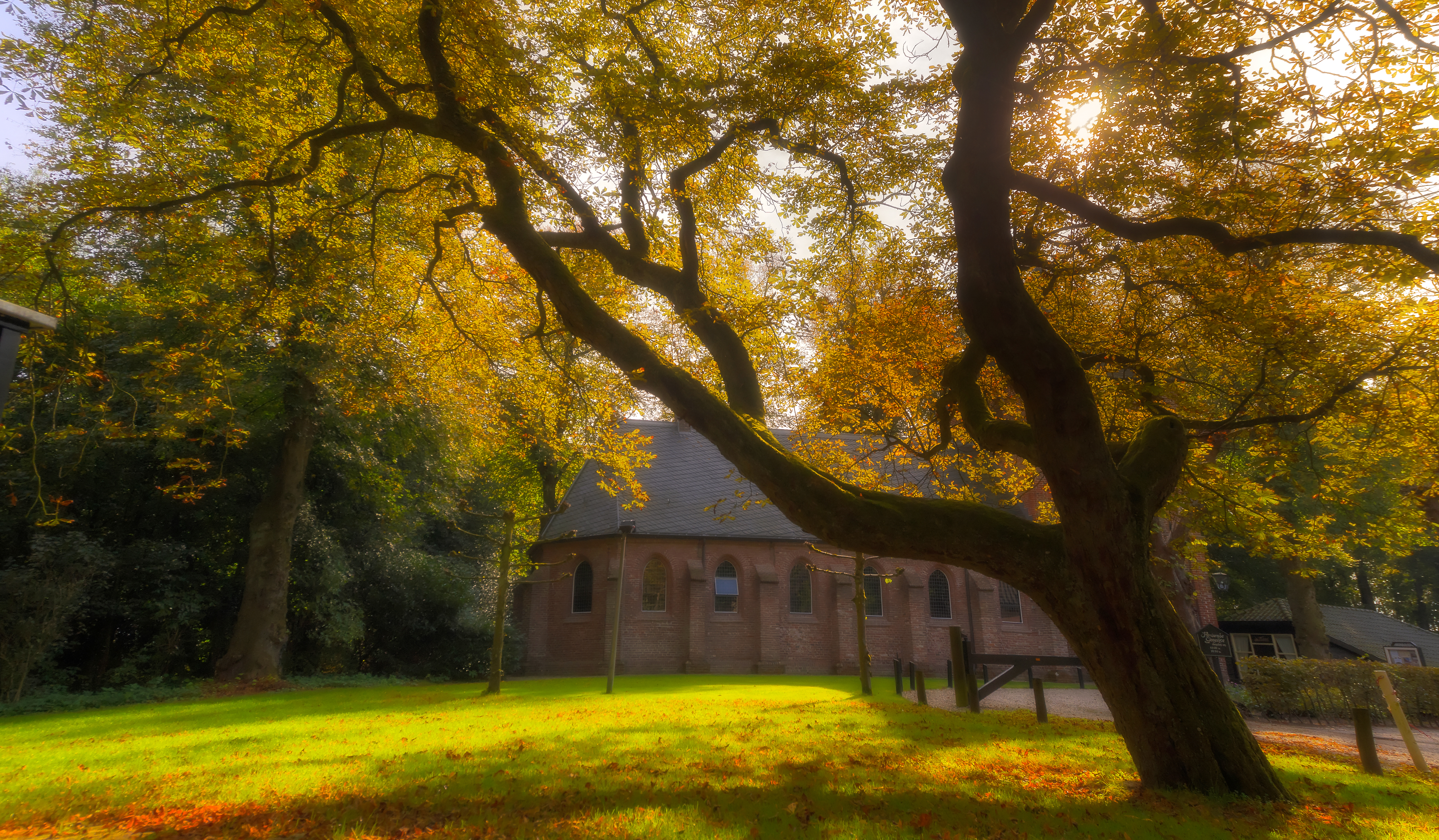
Kootwijk in autumn

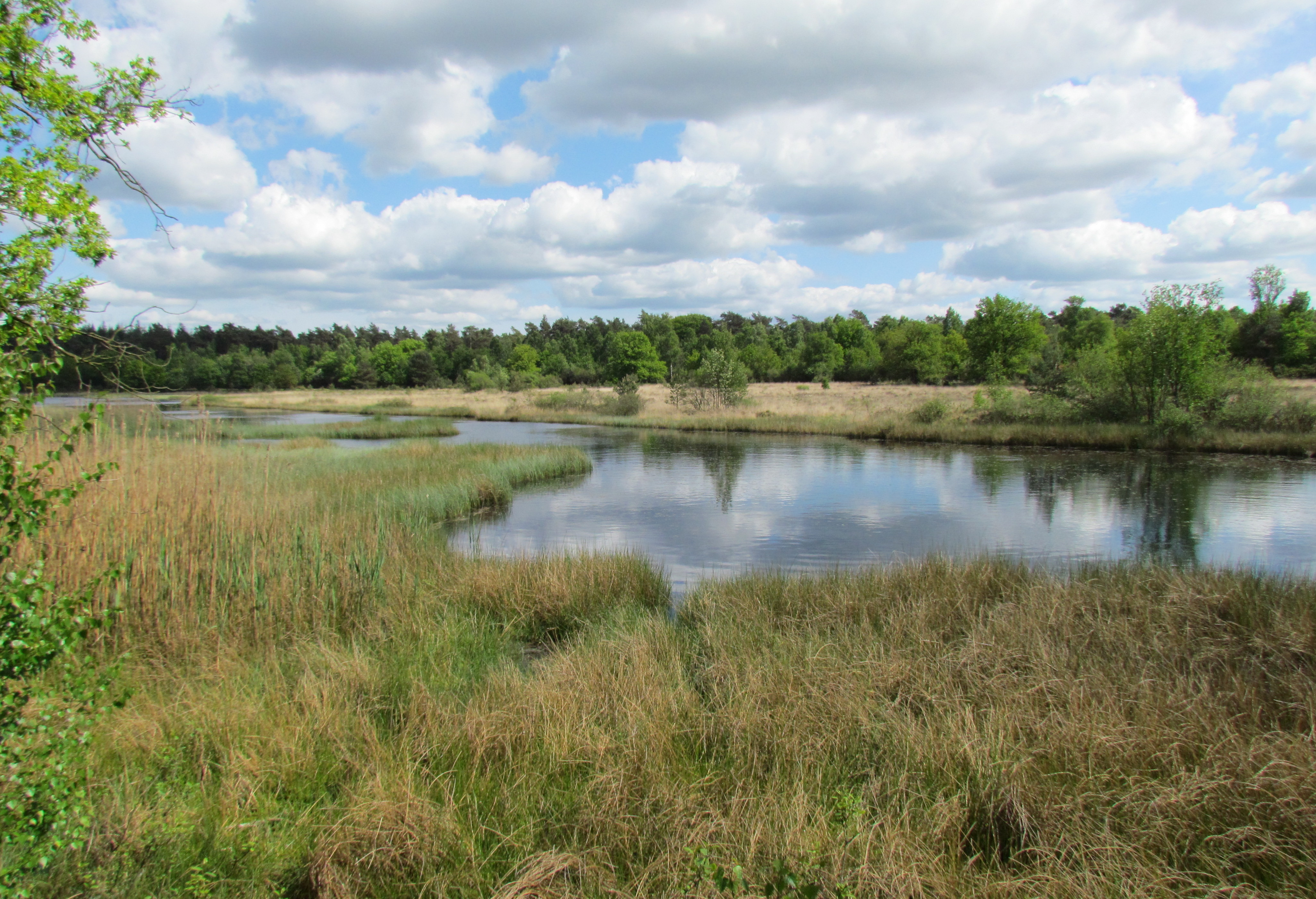
Kootwijkerveen

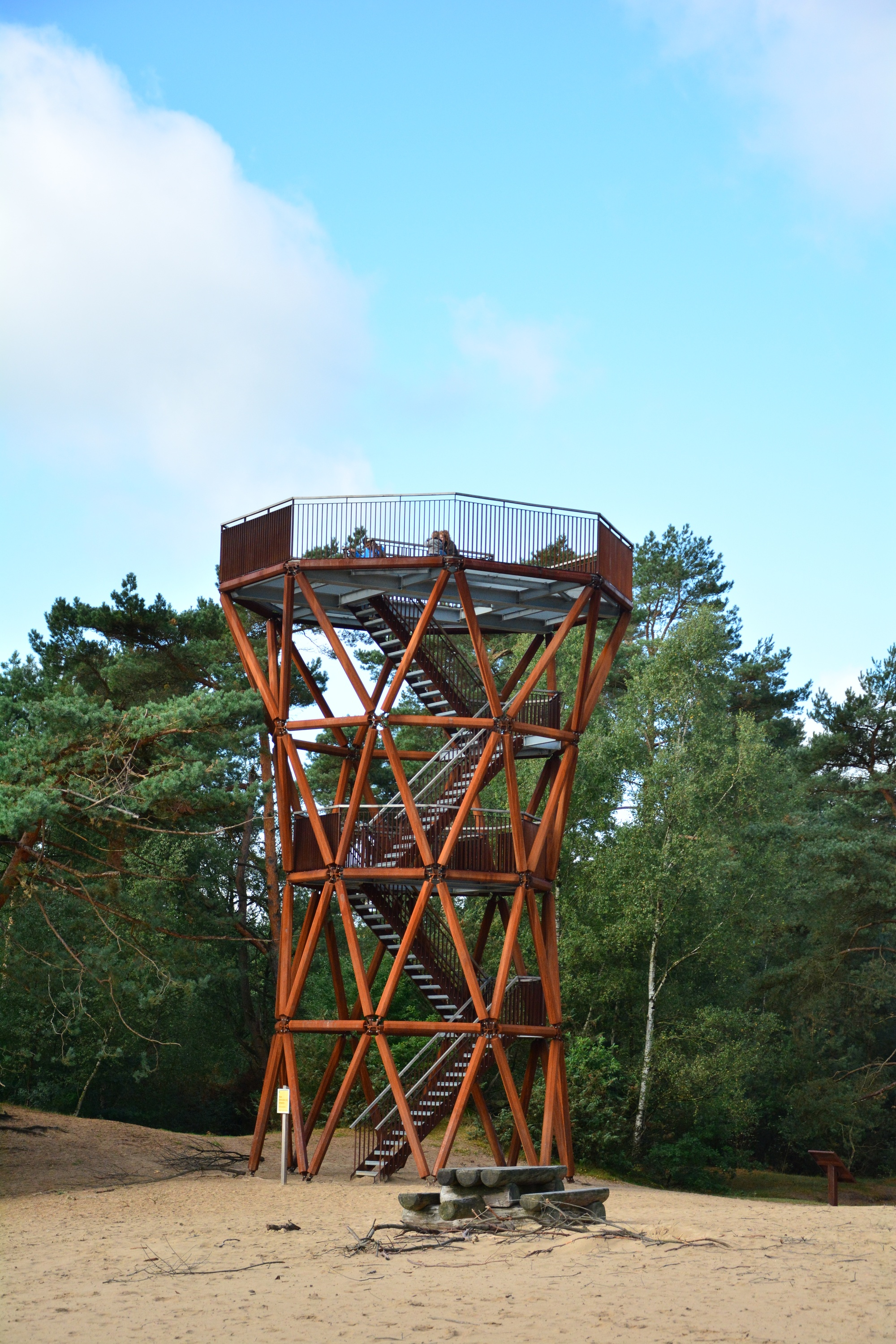
Watch tower at Kootwijkerzand
