= Provincial road N705 (Netherlands) =

Road in the Netherlands

Provincial highway 705
- Provinciale weg 705
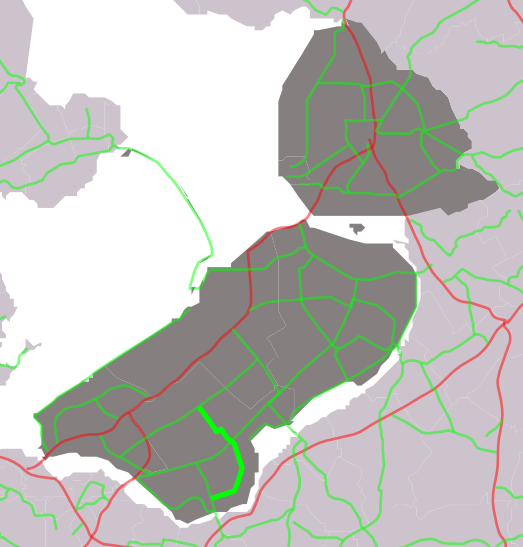

Major junctions
- North end: N 706 between Almere and Lelystad

- South end: N 301 near Zeewolde

Location
- Country: Kingdom of the Netherlands
- Constituent country: Netherlands
- Provinces: Flevoland
- Municipalities: Zeewolde

Highway system
- Roads in the Netherlands; Motorways; E-roads; Provincial; City routes

Provincial road N705 (N705) is a road connecting N706 between Almere and Lelystad with N301 near Zeewolde.
