= Lelystad–Zwolle railway =

Railway in the Netherlands

Hanzelijn
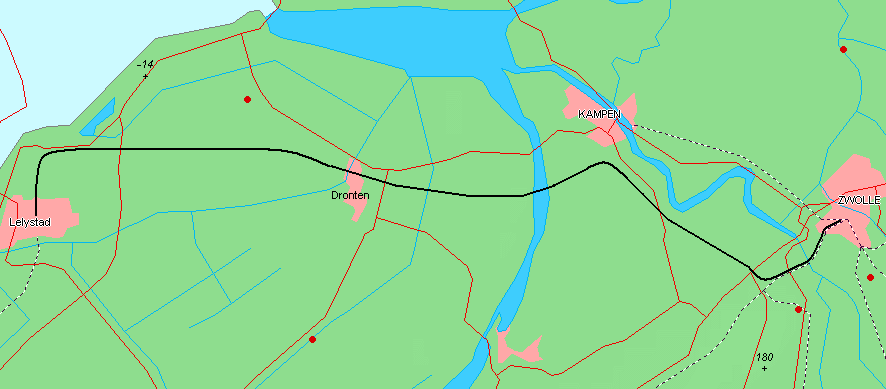
- Route of the Hanzelijn

Overview
- Locale: Netherlands
- Website: www.hanzelijn.nl

Service
- Operator(s): Nederlandse Spoorwegen; Arriva

History
- Opened: 2012

Technical
- Line length: 50 km (31 mi)
- Track gauge: Standard (1,435 mm or 4 ft 8 1/2 in)
- Electrification: 1.5 kV DC
- Operating speed: ATB-EG: 140 km/h (87 mph); ETCS: 200 km/h (120 mph)
- Signalling: ATB-EG, ETCS Level 2

The Lelystad–Zwolle railway, also known as the Hanzelijn (English: Hanseatic Line), is a Dutch railway line, finished in 2012. It connects Lelystad, capital of the province of Flevoland, with Zwolle, capital of the neighbouring province of Overijssel, and provides a direct rail link between Flevoland and the north-east of the Netherlands.

== Construction ==
The Hanzelijn project is a less costly alternative to the Zuiderzeelijn (Zuiderzee Line), a proposed new Lelystad-Groningen line via Emmeloord, Heerenveen and Drachten for which planning was cancelled in 2007.

Work started in January 2007 and was completed in December 2012. Two new stations have been built: Dronten and Kampen Zuid. The maximum speed on most of the line is 200 km/h (120 mph). As of 2022, no Dutch domestic rolling stock is capable of achieving this speed, as all existing rolling stock was limited to 160 km/h (99 mph). Since the trains currently running on the line only use train protection system ATB-EG, speed is limited to 140 km/h (87 mph) in practice. Operator NS is planning to operate their new ICNG trains on the route, which are capable of achieving the higher speeds. Delays in manufacturing have caused their introduction to be no earlier than the second half of 2023.

On 6 December 2012 the railway was opened by Queen Beatrix, using the Dutch Royal Train to traverse the new track. Scheduled services began operating on 9 December 2012. The journey from Lelystad to Zwolle takes 25 minutes, reducing journey times from Amsterdam to Zwolle – and further north – by about 15 minutes. The total length of the new track is 50 km.

== Infrastructure ==
The line includes a 790 metres (2,590 ft) tunnel under the Drontermeer (the semi-artificial channel separating the mainland from the reclaimed Eastern Flevoland), and joins the existing Utrecht–Kampen railway just before the 1 km (0.62 mi) high-level fixed bridge over the river IJssel. This new bridge, known as the Hanzeboog, includes a separate pedestrian and cycle track in addition to the double-tracked railway. It opened on 14 June 2011, replacing a rail-only twin-span vertical-lift drawbridge that had been in place since just after the Second World War.

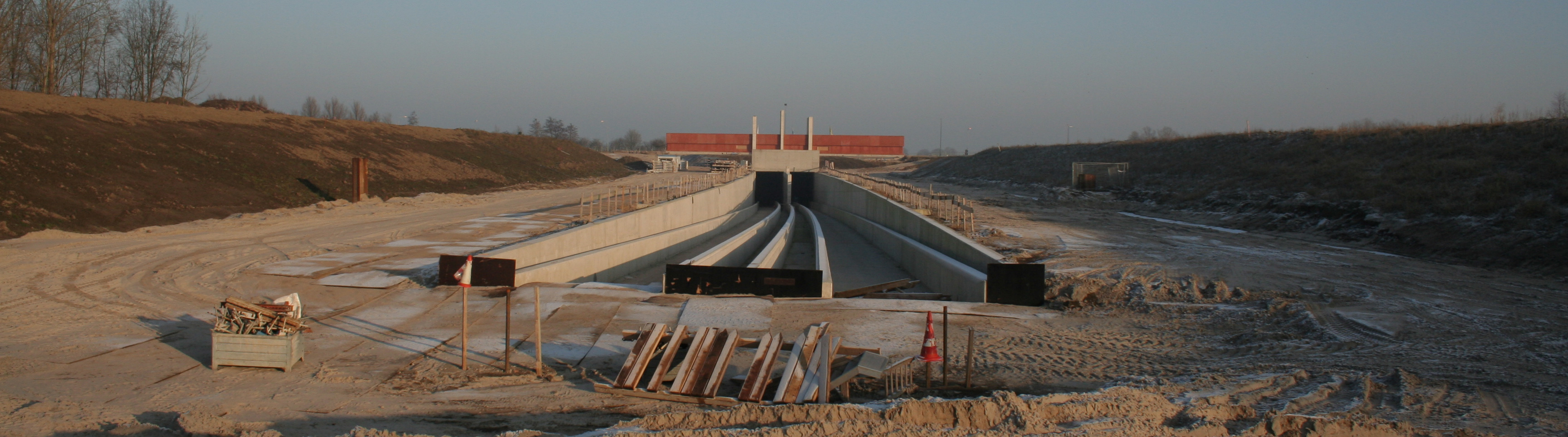
Tunnel under the Drontermeer

== Journey times ==
The Hanzelijn has shortened journey times between Zwolle and Amsterdam by at least 10 minutes, and up to 20 minutes for some journeys. Interliner express bus route 330, which connected Lelystad and Zwolle, was discontinued upon opening of the Hanzelijn.

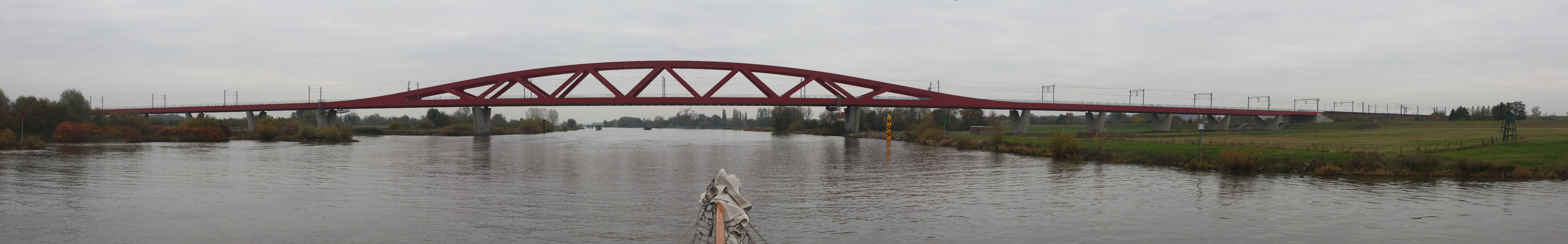
New rail bridge near Zwolle over the river IJssel, viewed towards the East. This bridge carries the Hanzelijn, and the Utrecht-Kampen railway.

== See also ==
- ZwolleSpoort project
