= Provincial road N702 (Netherlands) =

Road in the Netherlands

Provincial highway 702
- Provinciale weg 702
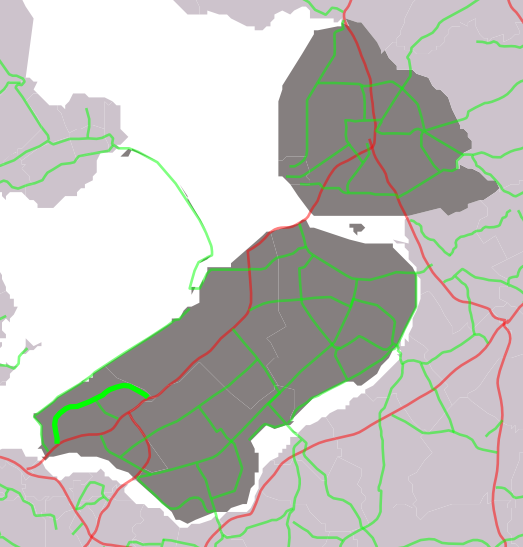

Major junctions
- South end: A 6 / S 101 / S 102 in Almere

- North end: A 6 / S 106 in Almere

Location
- Country: Kingdom of the Netherlands
- Constituent country: Netherlands
- Provinces: Flevoland
- Municipalities: Almere

Highway system
- Roads in the Netherlands; Motorways; E-roads; Provincial; City routes

Provincial road N702 (N702) is a road connecting Rijksweg 6 (A6) in southern Almere with A6 in northern Almere.
