= Almere Stad =

Coordinates: 52°22′36″N 5°12′58″E

Almere City Almere Stad
- Borough of Almere
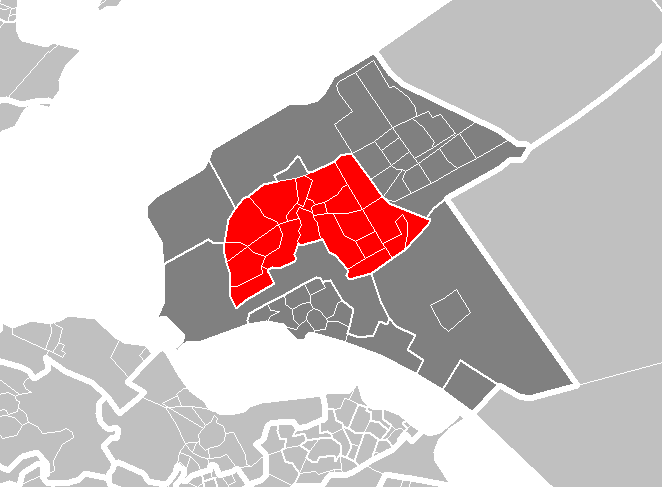
- Country: Netherlands
- Province: Flevoland
- Municipality: Almere

Population
  - Total: 113.838

Almere Stad is a district of the city Almere in the Dutch province Flevoland.

The first houses in Almere Stad were finished in 1980. Nowadays there are several residential areas, offices, industrial areas, parks, and a lake. The city hall as well as a regional hospital are located in Almere Stad.

In March 2006, the first shops in the new city centre were opened. This new city centre has been designed by Rem Koolhaas and hosts an attractive waterfront, a state of the art cinema, a theatre, several retail outlets, restaurants and apartments.
