= Provincial road N309 (Netherlands) =

Road in the Netherlands

Provincial highway 309
- Provinciale weg 309

Major junctions
- West end: A 6 / N 302 in Lelystad

- East end: A 50 near Epe

Location
- Country: Kingdom of the Netherlands
- Constituent country: Netherlands
- Provinces: Flevoland, Gelderland
- Municipalities: Lelystad, Dronten, Elburg, Epe

Highway system
- Roads in the Netherlands; Motorways; E-roads; Provincial; City routes

Provincial road N309 (N309) is a road connecting Rijksweg 6 (A6) and N302 in Lelystad with A50 near Epe.
