= Swifterbant =

- Village
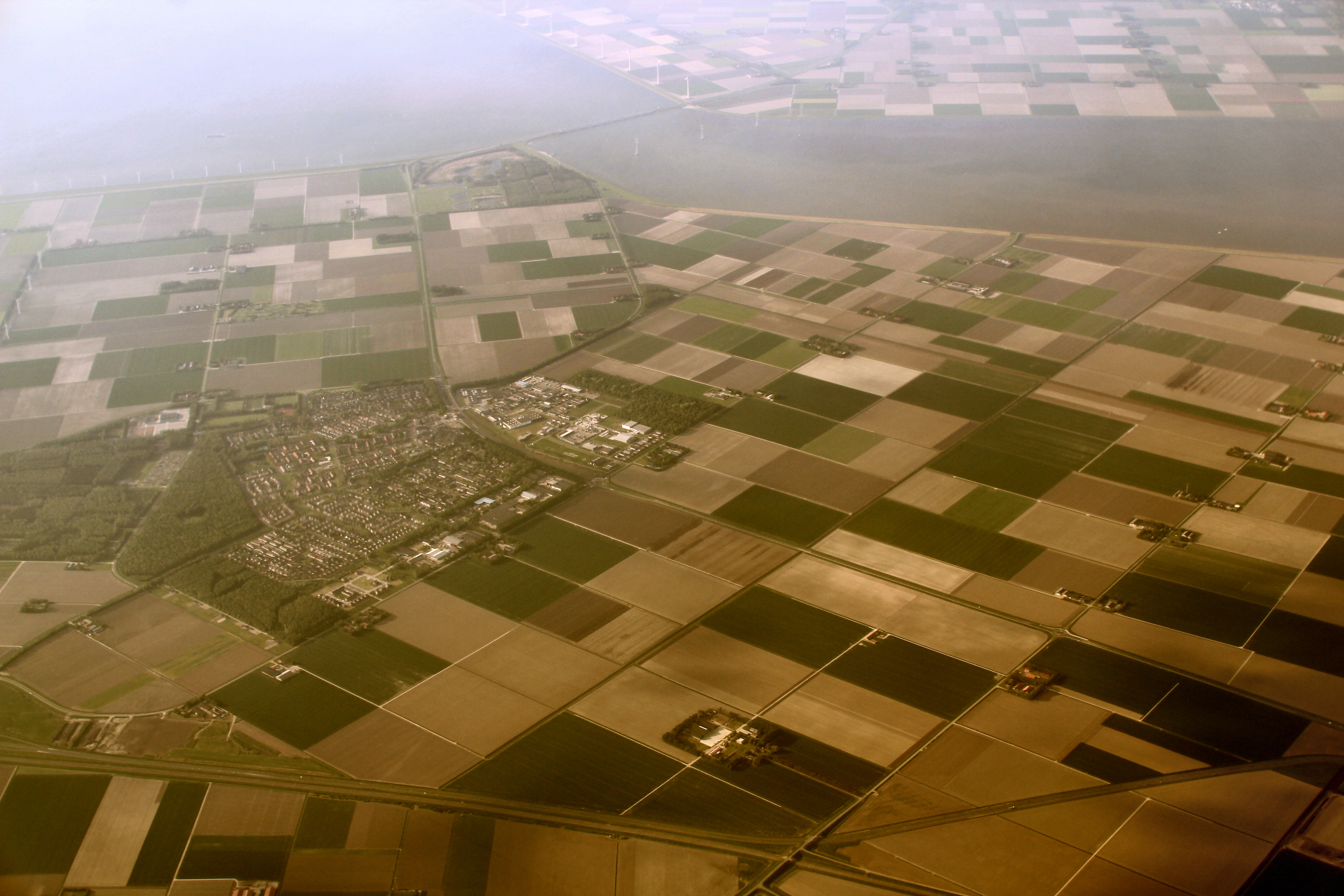
- Aerial view of Swifterbant

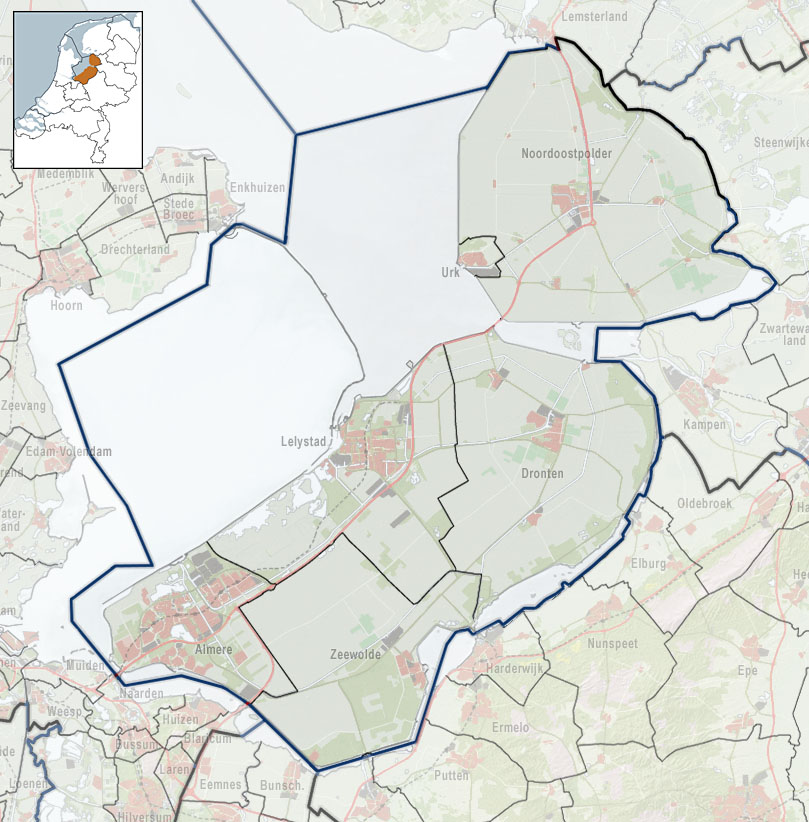
- Location of Swifterbant in the province of Flevoland
- Coordinates: 52°34′3″N 5°38′30″E
- Country: Netherlands
- Province: Flevoland
- Municipality: Dronten

Population (2025)
  - Total: 6,477
- Time zone: UTC+1 (CET)
  - Summer (DST): UTC+2 (CEST)
- Postcode: 8255
- Area code: 0321

Swifterbant (Dutch pronunciation: [ˌsʋɪftərˈbɑnt]) is a town in the Dutch province of Flevoland. It is a part of the municipality of Dronten, and lies about 13 km northeast of Lelystad.

As of 2025, Swifterbant had 6,477 inhabitants. The built-up area of the town is 2.42 km^{2} (0.93 sq mi), and contains 2,460 residences.

Location of Swifterbant in the municipality Dronten

== Archaeology ==
The town also gave its name to a Neolithic Swifterbant culture dated to between 5300 and 3400 BC, before the Roman Warm Period and follow-on Dunkirk transgressions.
