= Biddinghuizen =

- Village
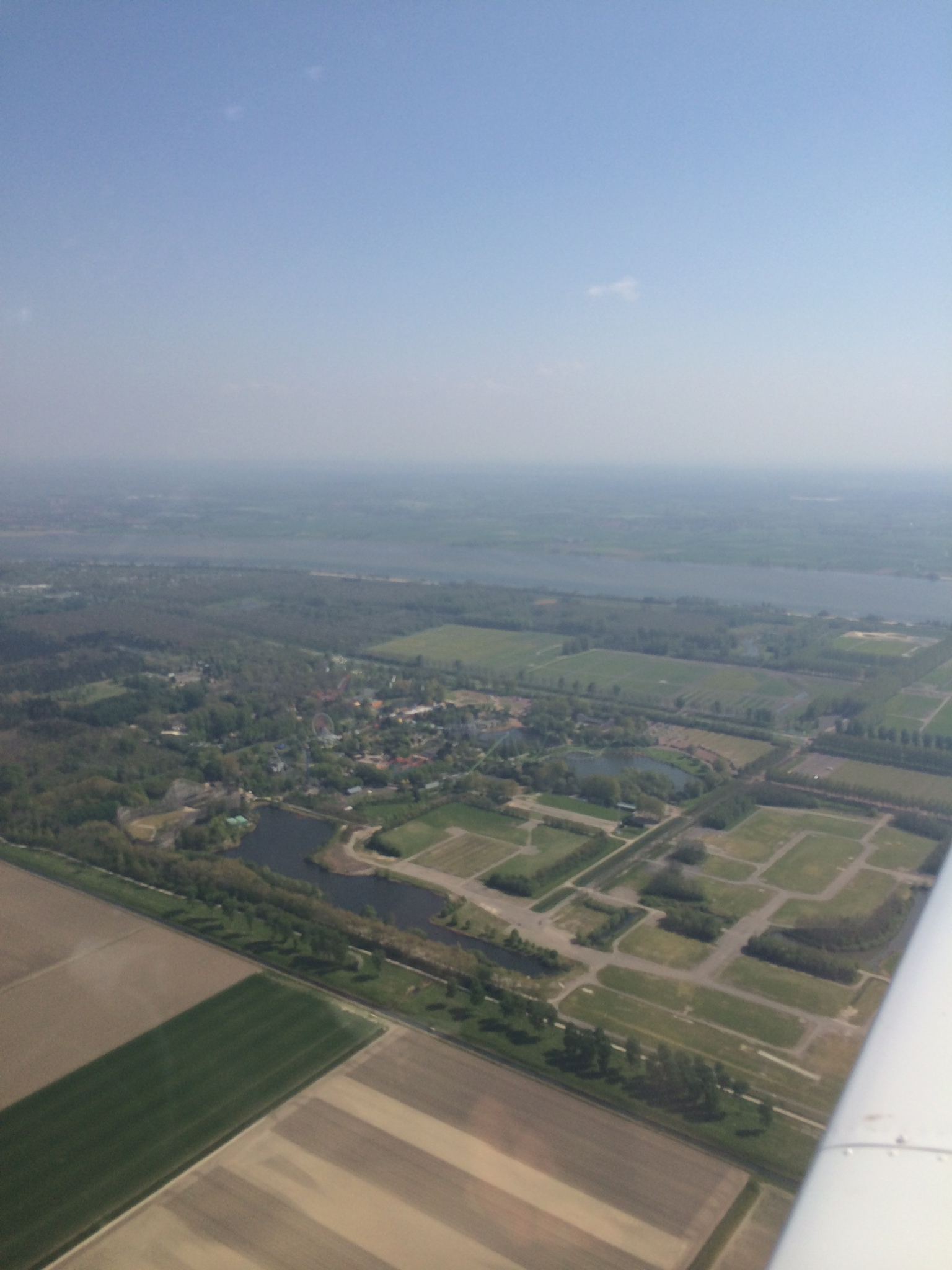
- Biddinghuizen from above

- Flag

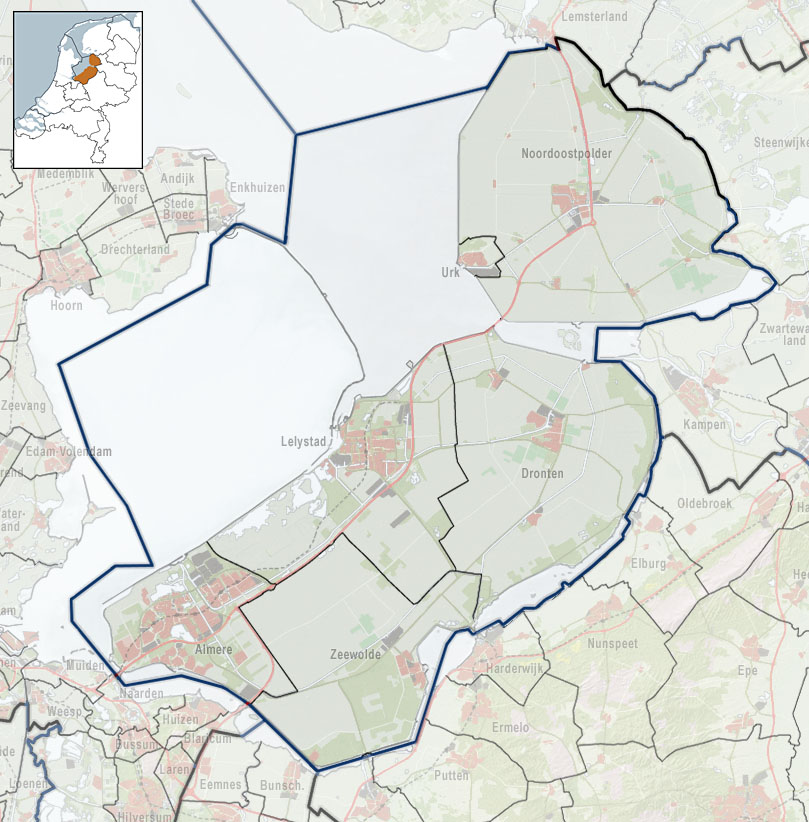
- Location of Biddinghuizen in the province of Flevoland
- Coordinates: 52°27′15″N 5°41′39″E
- Country: The Netherlands
- Province: Flevoland
- Municipality: Dronten
- First settled: 10 October 1963
- Named for: Bidningahusum
- Elevation: −3 m (−9.8 ft)

Population (2018)
  - Total: 6,295
- Demonym: Biddinghuizenaar
- Time zone: UTC+1 (CET)
  - Summer (DST): UTC+2 (CEST)
- Postcode: 8256
- Area code: 0321, 0320

Biddinghuizen (Dutch pronunciation: [ˌbɪdɪŋˈɦœyzə(n)]) is a village in the municipality of Dronten in the Netherlands. It is situated in the center of the province of Flevoland, about 13 km north of the city of Harderwijk.

On 1 January 2018, the village had 6,295 inhabitants. The built-up area of the village was 1.93 km^{2} (0.75 sq mi) and contained 1,995 residences.

Biddinghuizen is home of the annual Lowlands Festival and Defqon.1 Festival and Biddinghuizen contains the theme park Walibi Holland.

FlevOnice, a 3 km (2 mi) long, outdoor, refrigerated, ice skating track, opened in 2007 in Biddinghuizen and belongs to the longest in the world. A part of it is a standard speed skating rink, connected to the rest. The track was shortened from the original 5 km (3 mi) in 2013.

In 1994, Biddinghuizen hosted the European Scout Jamboree. In 1995, the 18th World Scout Jamboree was hosted. 28,960 Scouts and staff members from 166 countries and territories participated in this event.

The ultra athlete Ria Buiten is from Biddinghuizen.

The unique refrigerated skating track FlevOnice
