= Dronten =

- Municipality
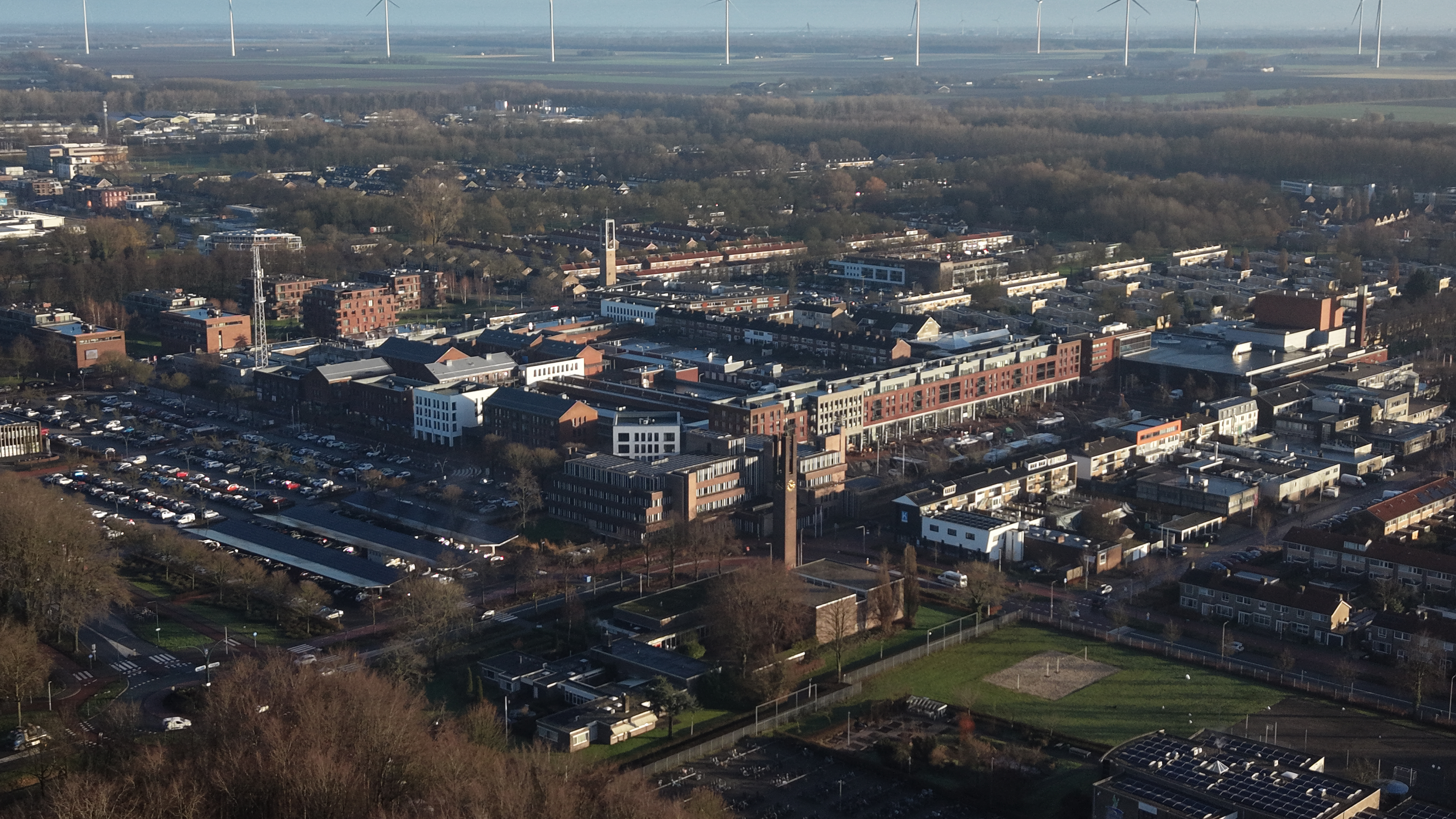
- Dronten centrum from above

- Flag Coat of arms

- Location in Flevoland
- Coordinates: 52°31′N 5°43′E
- Country: Netherlands
- Province: Flevoland
- Established: 1 January 1972

Government
  - Body: Municipal council
  - Mayor: Jean Paul Gebben (VVD)

Area
  - Total: 423.89 km^{2} (163.66 sq mi)
  - Land: 333.57 km^{2} (128.79 sq mi)
  - Water: 90.32 km^{2} (34.87 sq mi)
- Elevation: −2 m (−6.6 ft)

Population (January 2021)
  - Total: 42,011
  - Density: 126/km^{2} (330/sq mi)
- Demonym: Drontenaar
- Time zone: UTC+1 (CET)
  - Summer (DST): UTC+2 (CEST)
- Postcode: 8250–8259
- Area code: 0321
- Website: www.dronten.nl

Dronten (Dutch pronunciation: [ˈdrɔntə(n)]) is a municipality and a town in the central Netherlands, in the province of Flevoland. It had a population of 42,011 in 2021.

== History ==
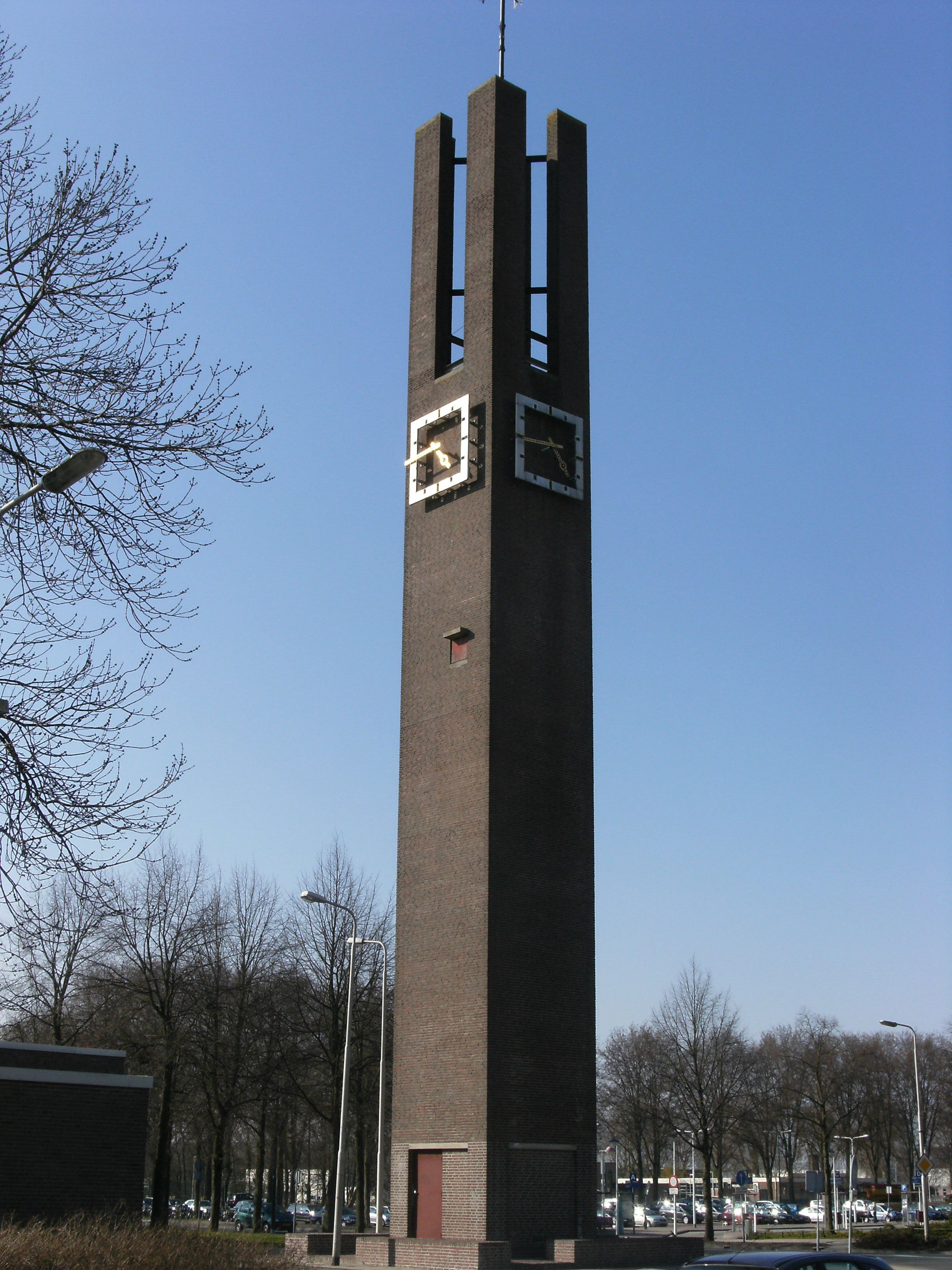
Dronten bell tower.

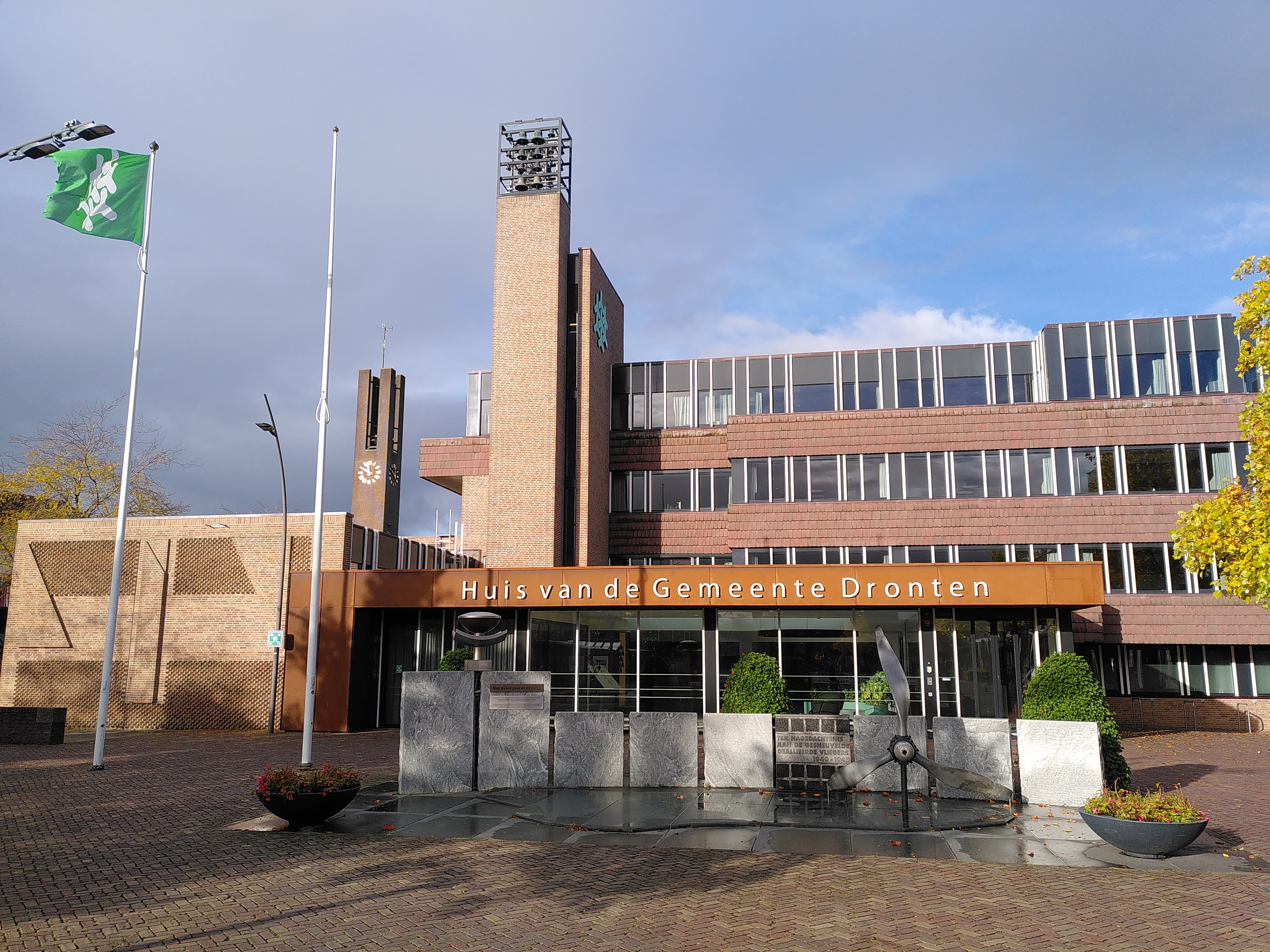
The town hall of the municipality of Dronten.

Plans for the municipality of Dronten were made in the early half of the 1950s; real plans for the town of Dronten (the municipality's center) were revealed in 1958.

The foundations for the town were laid in 1960. Right from the start there was a discussion whether Dronten was to become a town or a city. The first plans assumed 15,000 inhabitants, while later plans foresaw a growth to 30,000 inhabitants. The first plans for the municipality assumed ten smaller villages situated around the central town (in this case, Dronten). The number of villages was reduced because of increased motorized traffic and experiences gained in developing the Noordoostpolder, where a similar municipality had already been built. Eventually, it was decided that there were to be two smaller villages (Biddinghuizen and Swifterbant) and one larger town (Dronten).

On 1 January 1972, Dronten was given its official name.

In 1995, Dronten hosted in Biddinghuizen the 18th World Scout Jamboree. 28,960 Scouts and staff members from 166 countries and territories participated this event.

== Population centers ==
- Biddinghuizen
- Dronten
- Swifterbant
- Ketelhaven

=== Topography ===
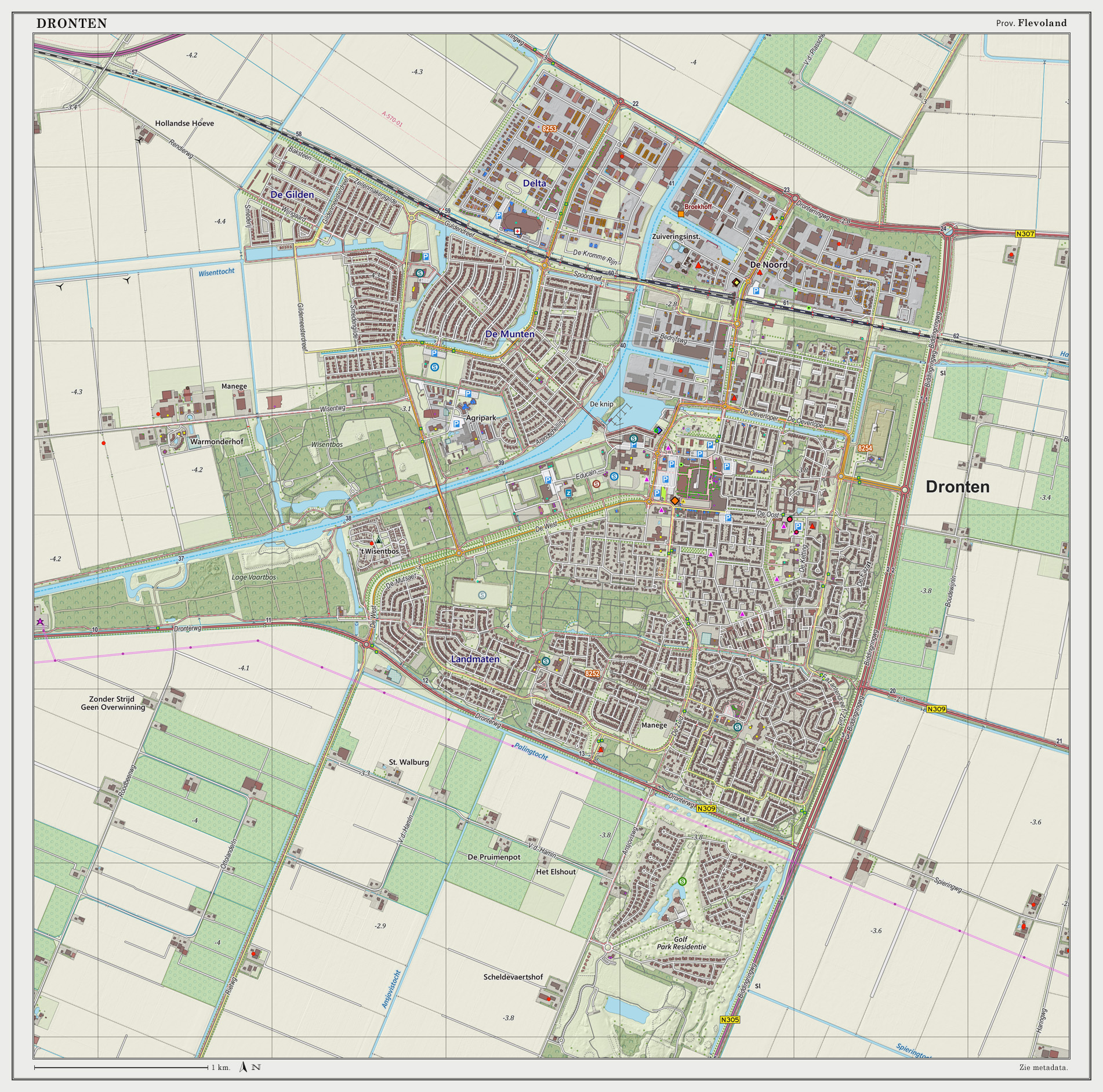

Dutch Topographic map of Dronten (town), March 2014.

== Transportation ==
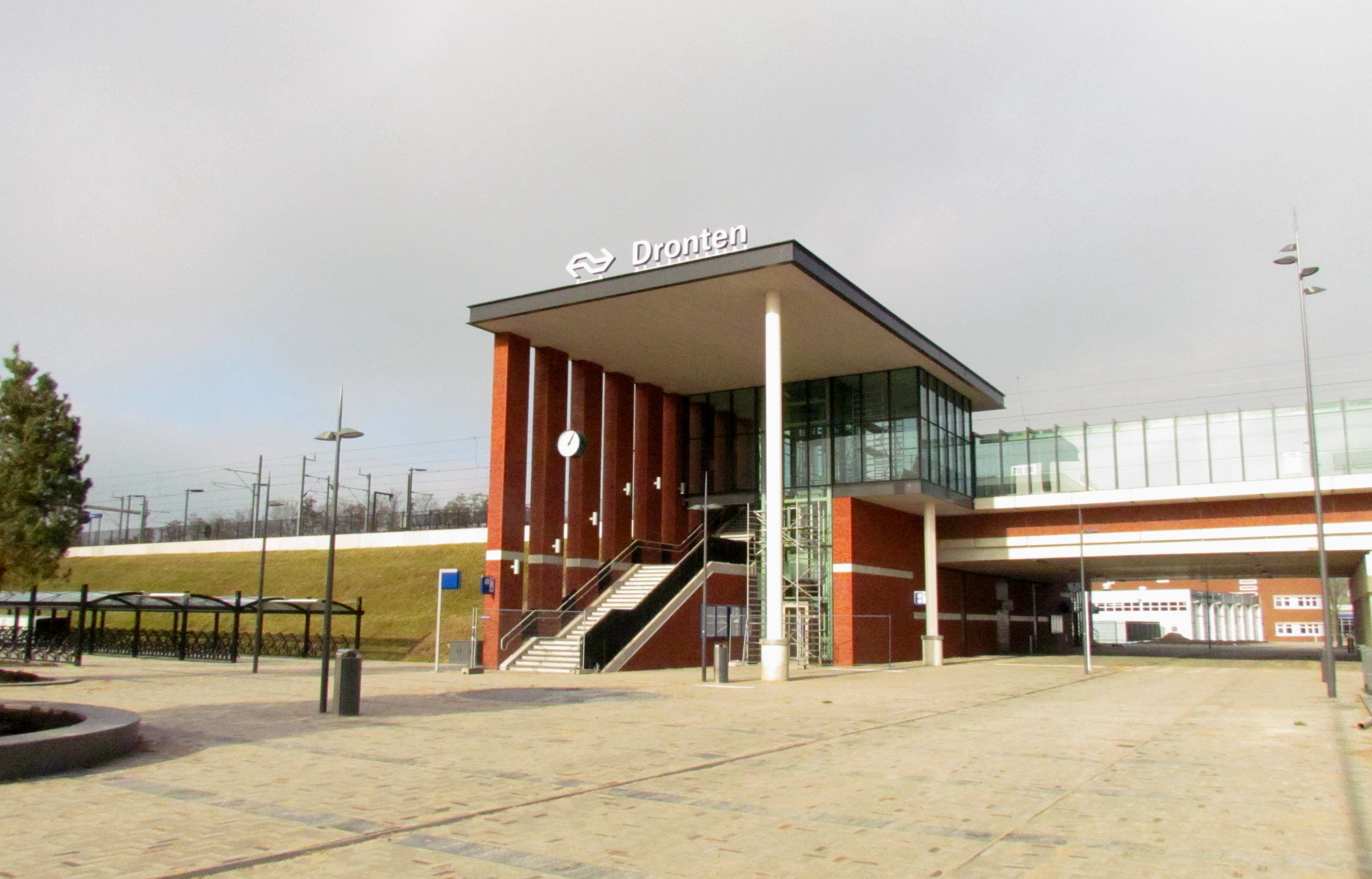
Railway station Dronten

Dronten has a railway station on the Lelystad-Zwolle railway.

The majority of velomobile manufacturers in the world are based in Dronten. They include Alligt, velomobiel.nl and InterCityBike.

== Entertainment ==
Biddinghuizen contains the theme park Walibi Holland.

== Sister city relations ==
- Ōgata, Akita, Japan (friendship city)

== Notable people ==
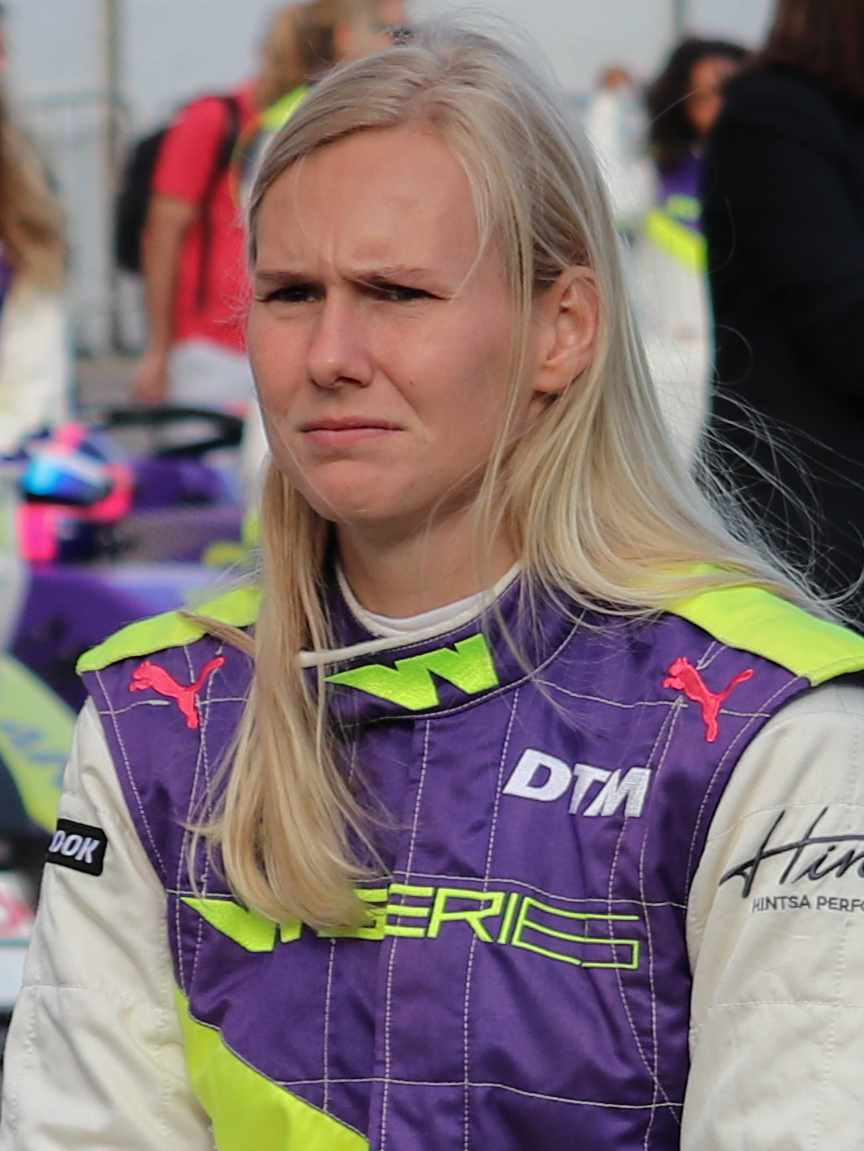
Beitske Visser, 2019

- Patrick Paauwe (born 1977), Dutch former professional footballer with 451 caps
- Cees Paauwe (born 1975), Dutch former football goalkeeper with over 100 caps
- Bertolf Lentink (born 1980), Dutch singer/songwriter who plays guitar and piano
- Ricardo Talu (born 1993), Dutch-Angolan professional footballer
- Hakim Ziyech (born 1993), Dutch-Moroccan professional footballer, currently playing for Wydad AC
- Beitske Visser (born 1995), Dutch female racing driver
