= N50 road (Netherlands) =

Road in the Netherlands

Provincial highway 50
- Provinciale weg 50
- Motorways in the Netherlands with A50 and N50 bolt

Route information
- Maintained by Rijkswaterstaat

Major junctions
- South end: E232 / A 28 / A 50 in Hattem

- N 764 in Kampen; N 307 in Kampen; N 352 in Ens
- North end: A 6 in Emmeloord

Location
- Country: Kingdom of the Netherlands
- Constituent country: Netherlands
- Provinces: North Brabant, Gelderland, Overijssel, Flevoland

Highway system
- Roads in the Netherlands; Motorways; E-roads; Provincial; City routes

N50, partially known as Rijksweg 50 and Rijksweg 838, is a road connecting Rijksweg 6 (A6) in Emmeloord with A50 and A28 / European route E232 (E 232) at the Hattemerbroek interchange in Zwolle.

The road is maintained by Rijkswaterstaat.

== Route description ==
N50 starts at the Hattemerbroek interchange and travels to the north–west. A railroad runs parallel to the road until Kampen. Just before exit 31, the road passes over a bridge. This bridge has been constructed because a river will be flowing under it in the near future. The road runs along Kampen, and just before traveling across river IJssel using the Eilandbrug, there is an incomplete exit, exit 32a, created for trucks to serve the industrial area of Kampen. A little later, N50 runs across river Ramsdiep using the Ramspolbrug. From this bridge up to the town of Ens at exit 33, provincial road N765 (N765) runs parallel to the road. The highway travels further, and reaches its northern terminus at the Emmeloord interchange with Rijksweg 6 (A6) near Emmeloord.

== History ==
Over time, N50 has changed significantly over its entire length. From the Hattermerbroek interchange up to Kampen, there used to be fewer lanes. A bridge has been created for the future river to flow under it, just before reaching Kampen. In Kampen, the road used to travel through the center.

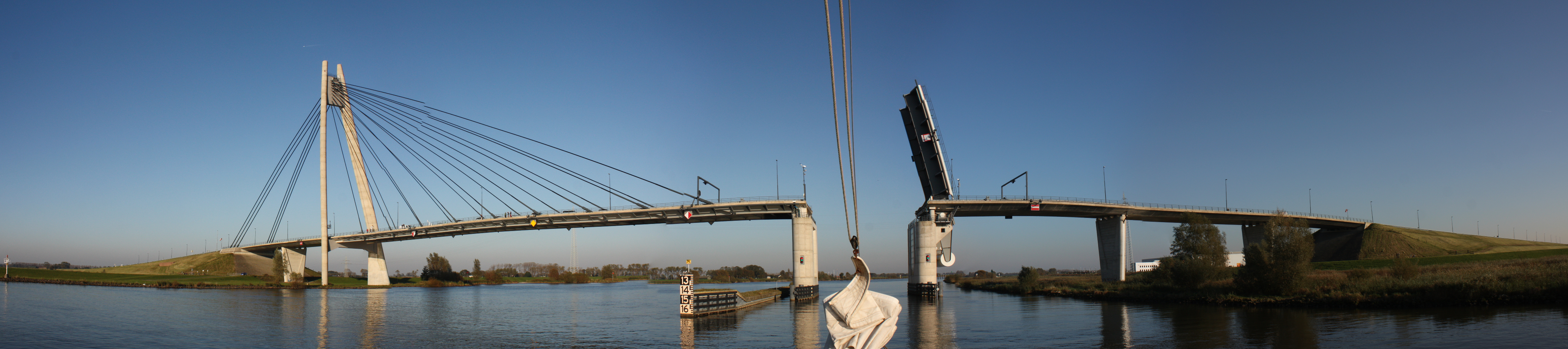
Eilandbrug Kampen Panorama (2011)

After exit 32a, a combined cable-stayed and bascule bridge Eilandbrug was completed in 2003 to cross the river IJssel. The bridge across rivers Ramsdiep and Ramsgeul has been rebuilt in 2010.

== Junction list ==
Province	Municipality	km	mi	Exit	Destinations	Notes
Gelderland	Hattem				A 50 south–east / A 28 / E232 – Heerde, Zwolle, Wezep	
Overijssel	Kampen			Zalkerbroek rest area		
Reevediep				Bridge across river Reevediep		
Overijssel	Kampen			31	N 764 north–east – Kampen, IJsselmuiden	
Overijssel	Kampen			32	N 307 – Dronten, Kampen	
Overijssel	Kampen			32a	Haatlanderdijk	Northbound exit and southbound entrance
IJssel				Eilandbrug		
Ramsgeul				Ramspolbrug		
Ramsdiep				Ramspolbrug		
Flevoland	Noordoostpolder			33	N 352 – Ens, Urk	
Flevoland	Noordoostpolder			—	Kamperweg / Bomenweg	Northbound exit and southbound entrance
Flevoland	Noordoostpolder				A 6 – Emmeloord, Urk, Lelystad	
1.000 mi = 1.609 km; 1.000 km = 0.621 mi: Concurrency terminus; Incomplete access
