= Provincial road N331 (Netherlands) =

Highway in the Netherlands

Provincial highway 331
- Provinciale weg 331
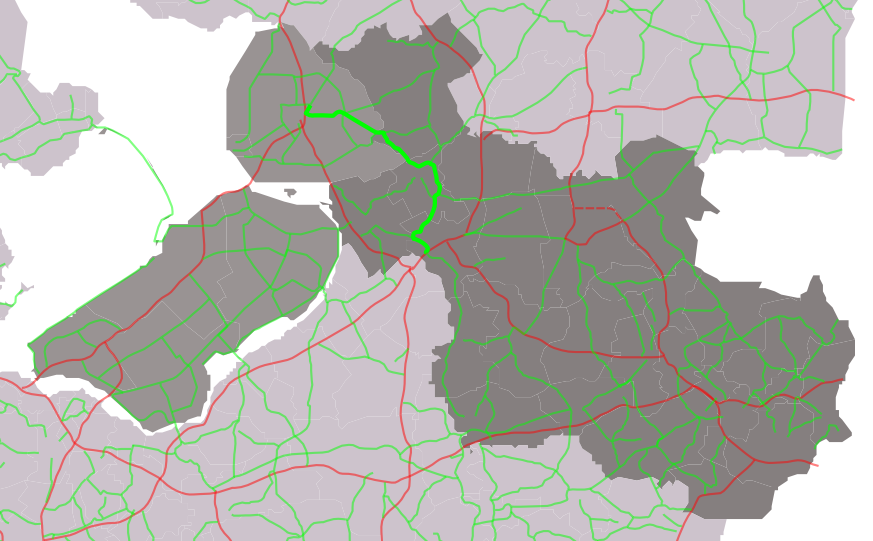

Major junctions
- North end: A 6 / N 351 in Emmeloord

- N 351 in Emmeloord; N 715 in Marknesse; N 333 in Marknesse; N 352 near Vollenhove; N 762 in Vollenhove; N 334 in Zwartsluis; N 377 in Hasselt; N 759 in Hasselt; N 764 in Zwolle

- South end: E232 / A 28 / N 337 in Zwolle

Location
- Country: Kingdom of the Netherlands
- Constituent country: Netherlands
- Provinces: Flevoland, Overijssel
- Municipalities: Noordoostpolder, Steenwijkerland, Zwartewaterland, Zwolle

Highway system
- Roads in the Netherlands; Motorways; E-roads; Provincial; City routes

Provincial road N331 (N331) is a road connecting Rijksweg 6 (A6) and N351 in Emmeloord with European route E232 (E 232) / A6 and N337 in Zwolle.

== Major intersections ==
Province	Municipality	km	mi	Destinations	Notes
Flevoland	Noordoostpolder	0.000	0.000	A 6 / N 351 – Emmeloord	West end of N351 overlap
Flevoland	Noordoostpolder			N 351 – Emmeloord, Kuinre	East end of N351 overlap
Flevoland	Noordoostpolder			N 715 north – Luttelgeest	
Flevoland	Noordoostpolder			N 333 north–east – Blokzijl, Steenwijk	
Flevoland	Noordoostpolder			N 352 west – Kraggenburg, Ens	
Overijssel	Steenwijkerland			N 762 – Wanneperveen, Giethoorn	
Overijssel	Zwartewaterland			N 334 north – Zwartsluis, Meppel	
Overijssel	Zwartewaterland			N 377 west – Hasselt, Nieuwleusen	
Overijssel	Zwartewaterland			N 759 north – Genemuiden	
Overijssel	Zwolle			N 764 west – Kampen, Overijssel	
Overijssel	Zwolle			E232 / A 28 / N 337 east – Zwolle, Wijhe, Wezep	
1.000 mi = 1.609 km; 1.000 km = 0.621 mi: Concurrency terminus
