= SH760 =

SH760 may refer to:

- Shanghai SH760, an automobile produced in China
- State Highway 760
