= Provincial road N377 (Netherlands) =

Highway in the Netherlands

Provincial highway 377
- Provinciale weg 377
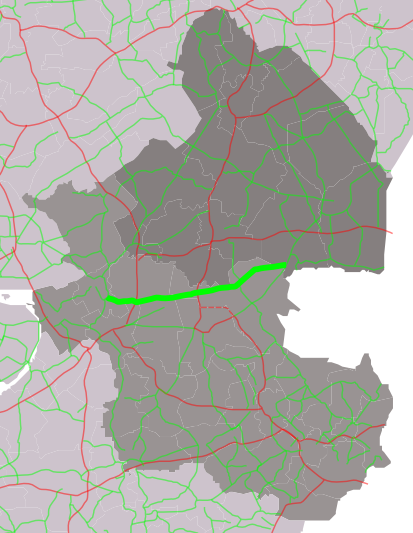
- Location of the N377 provincial road

Route information
- Length: 44 km (27 mi)

Major junctions
- West end: Hasselt
- A 28 / E232 – Rouveen, Nieuwleusen
- South end: Coevorden

Location
- Country: Kingdom of the Netherlands
- Constituent country: Netherlands
- Provinces: Overijssel, Drenthe

Highway system
- Roads in the Netherlands; Motorways; E-roads; Provincial; City routes

Provincial road N377 is a Dutch provincial road between Hasselt, in the province of Overijssel, and Coevorden, in the province of Drenthe. Parts of the road are expressway, mainly in between the A28 and Slagharen. The road consists of 1x2 driving lanes, with an exception of 2x2 lanes in Nieuwleusen and Balkbrug. There are a few grade-separated crossings. The road has a length of 44 km (27 miles).

== Junction and exit list ==
| Province | Municipality | km | mi | Destinations | Notes |
|---|---|---|---|---|---|
| Overijssel | Zwartewaterland | 0 | 0.0 | N 331 – Hasselt | Joins road N331 to Emmeloord or Zwolle |
| Overijssel | Zwolle | 7 | 4.3 | | |
| Overijssel | Hardenberg | 22 | 14 | | |
| Overijssel | Hardenberg | 26 | 16 | | |
| Overijssel | Hardenberg | 32 | 20 | | |
| Overijssel | Hardenberg | 32 | 20 | | |
| Drenthe | Coevorden | 44 | 27 | N 34 – Coevorden | Joins road N34 to De Punt or Ommen |
1.000 mi = 1.609 km; 1.000 km = 0.621 mi
