= Provincial road N765 (Netherlands) =

Road in the Netherlands

Provincial highway 765
- Provinciale weg 765
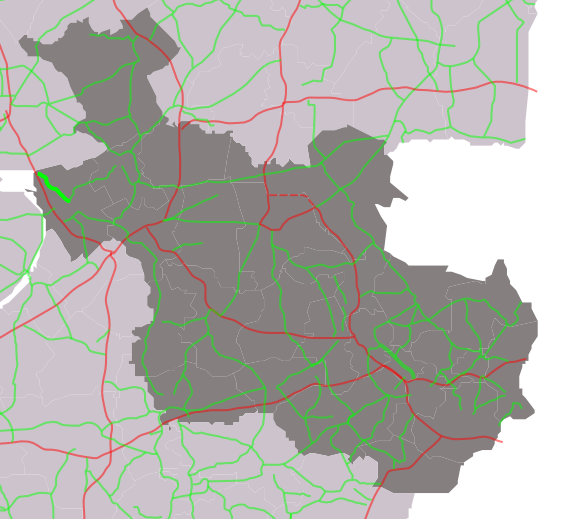

Major junctions
- From: N 352 in Ens

- N 760 in IJsselmuiden

- To: N 764 in IJsselmuiden

Location
- Country: Kingdom of the Netherlands
- Constituent country: Netherlands
- Provinces: Flevoland, Overijssel
- Municipalities: Ens, IJsselmuiden

Highway system
- Roads in the Netherlands; Motorways; E-roads; Provincial; City routes

Provincial road N765 (N765) is a road connecting N352 in Ens with N764 south of IJsselmuiden.
