= Zalk en Veecaten =

Former municipality in Overijssel, Netherlands

Coordinates: 52°31′14″N 6°0′30″E

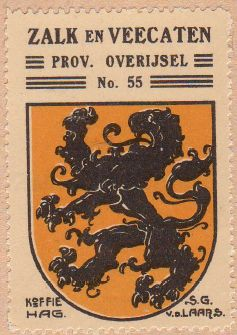
Seal of the former municipality Zalk en Veecaten

Zalk en Veecaten is a former municipality in the Dutch province of Overijssel. The area is now part of the municipality of Kampen. The municipality covered the villages Zalk, on the south bank of the River IJssel, and Veecaten on the other side.

Zalk en Veecaten was a separate municipality until 1937, when it became a part of IJsselmuiden.

The coat of arms depicts a black lion rampant, flanked by the capital letters Z and V in black, on a shield of gold (yellow). The flag is an armorial banner.

Zalk en Veecaten has about 1,450 inhabitants.
