= Zalk =

- Village
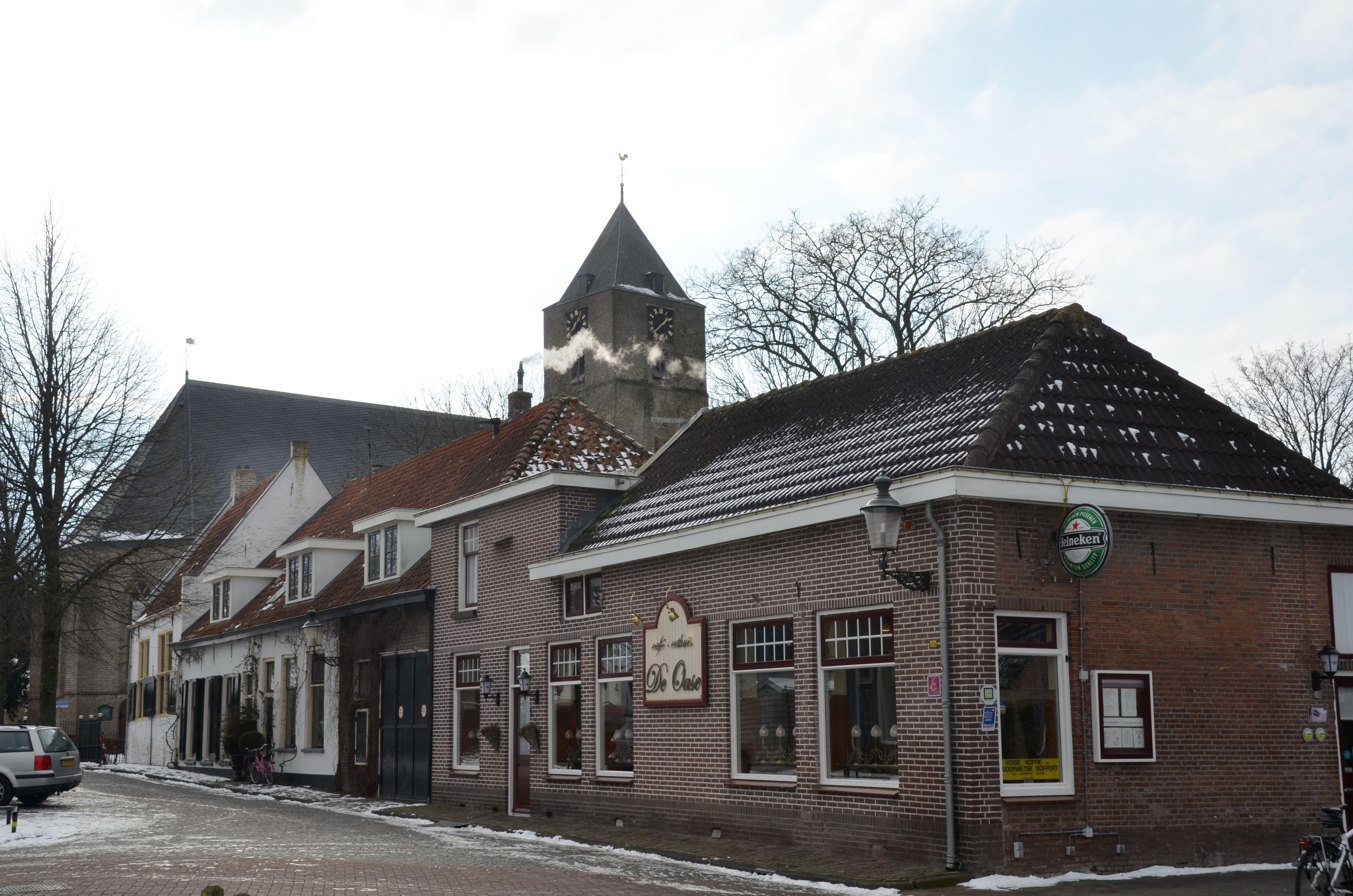
- Village view

- Location in the province of Overijssel in the Netherlands Zalk (Netherlands)
- Coordinates: 52°31′N 6°01′E
- Country: Netherlands
- Province: Overijssel
- Municipality: Kampen

Area
  - Total: 4.09 km^{2} (1.58 sq mi)
- Elevation: 10 m (33 ft)

Population (2021)
  - Total: 420
  - Density: 100/km^{2} (270/sq mi)
- Time zone: UTC+1 (CET)
  - Summer (DST): UTC+2 (CEST)
- Postal code: 7687
- Dialing code: 0546

Zalk is a village on the west bank of the river IJssel within the municipality of Kampen in the Dutch province of Overijssel. It is situated just behind the winter dike of the IJssel river across from Wilsum.

== History ==
The village was first mentioned in 1213 as Santlike, and means "sand near natural stream". Zalk is an esdorp which developed on the western bank of the IJssel river.

The Dutch Reformed church was built in the 12th century. The nave and choir are from around 1400 and were built using material of the older church. The castle De Buckhorst used to be located near the village. It was first mentioned in 1244, but demolished in 1841. Zalk was home to 444 people in 1840.

The village was part of the heerlijkheid (fiefdom) Zalk en Veecaten. After the creation of municipalities in 1813 the fiefdom was transformed to the municipality of Zalk en Veecaten. This municipality was incorporated in the municipality of IJsselmuiden in 1937 and which in turn has been part of the municipality of Kampen since 2001.

== Notable people ==
Zalk is nationally known as the residence of the traditional herbalist Klazien uit Zalk (real name: Klaasje Rotstein-van den Brink; 1918–1997). Klazien's fame increased after Wim de Bie parodied her on national television as Berendien uut Wisp.

== Gallery ==
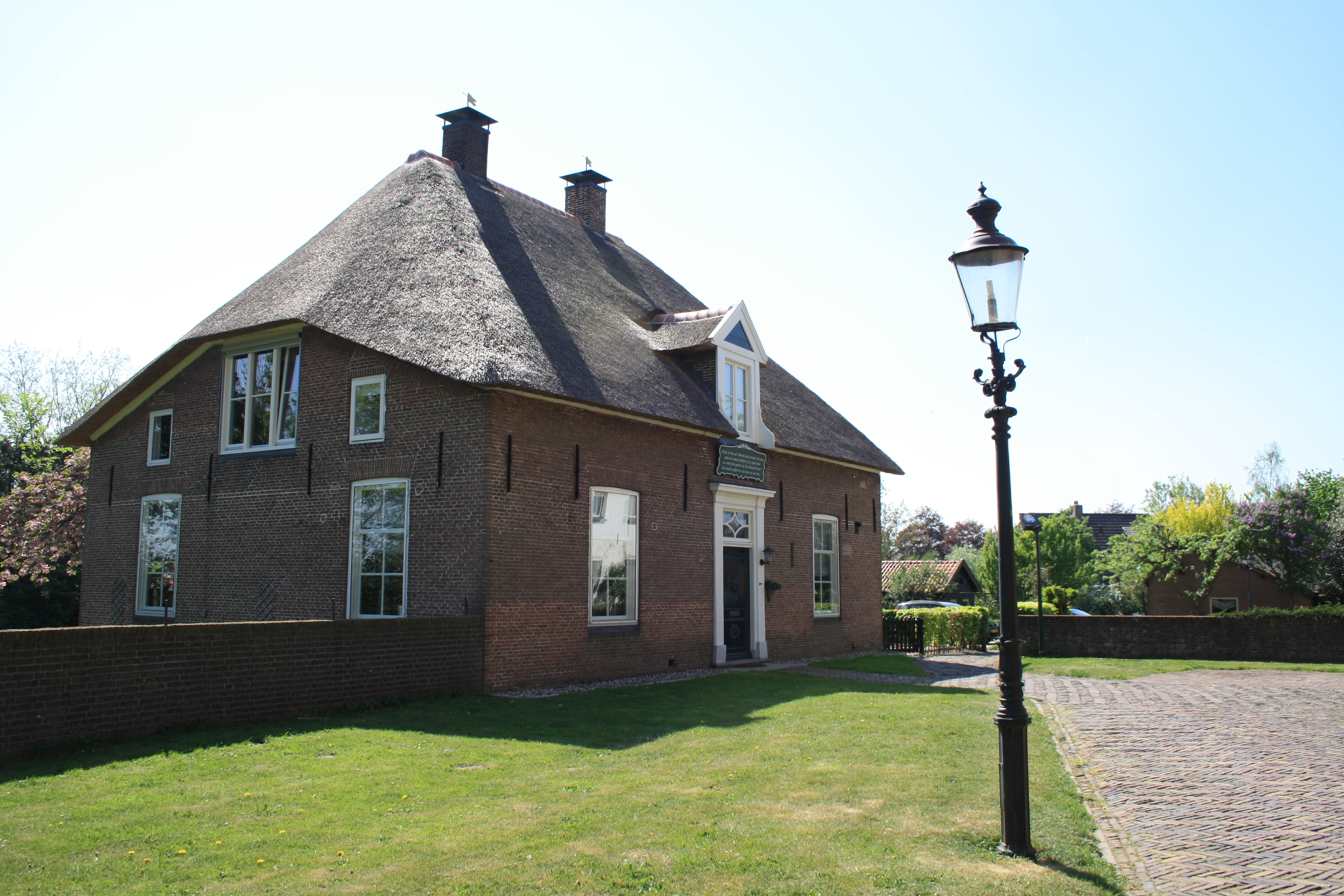
Former clergy house

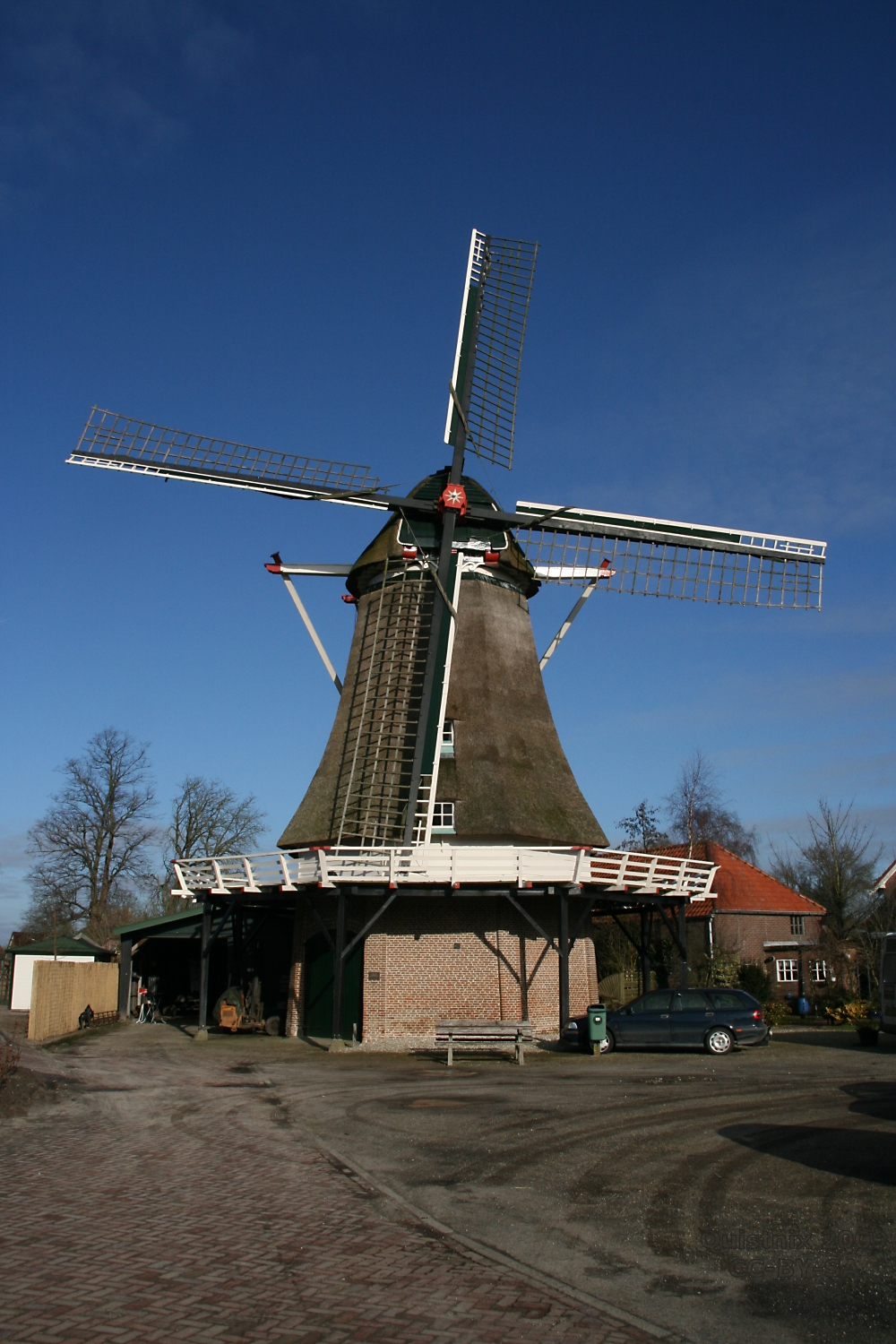
Wind mill De Valk

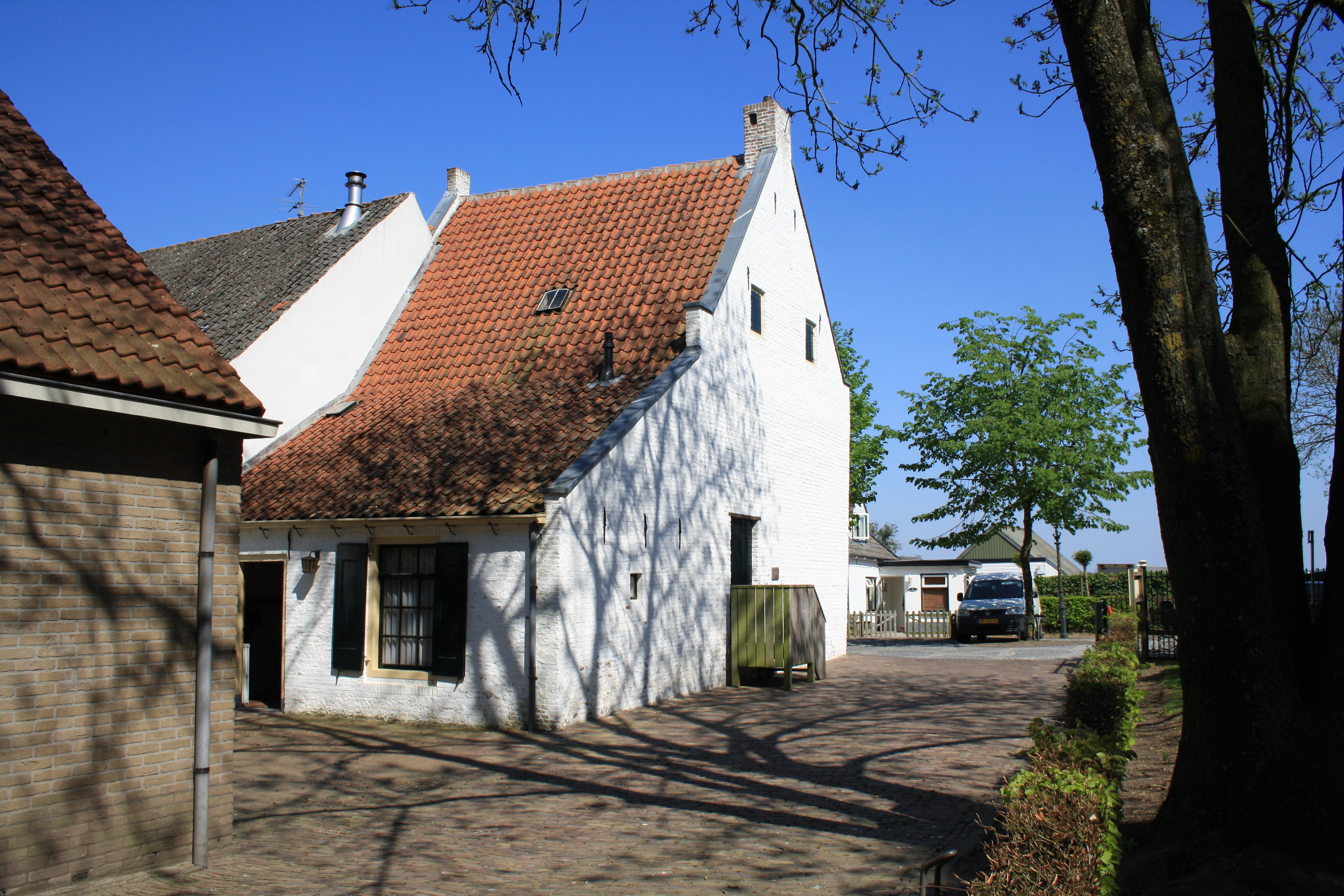
Former courthouse

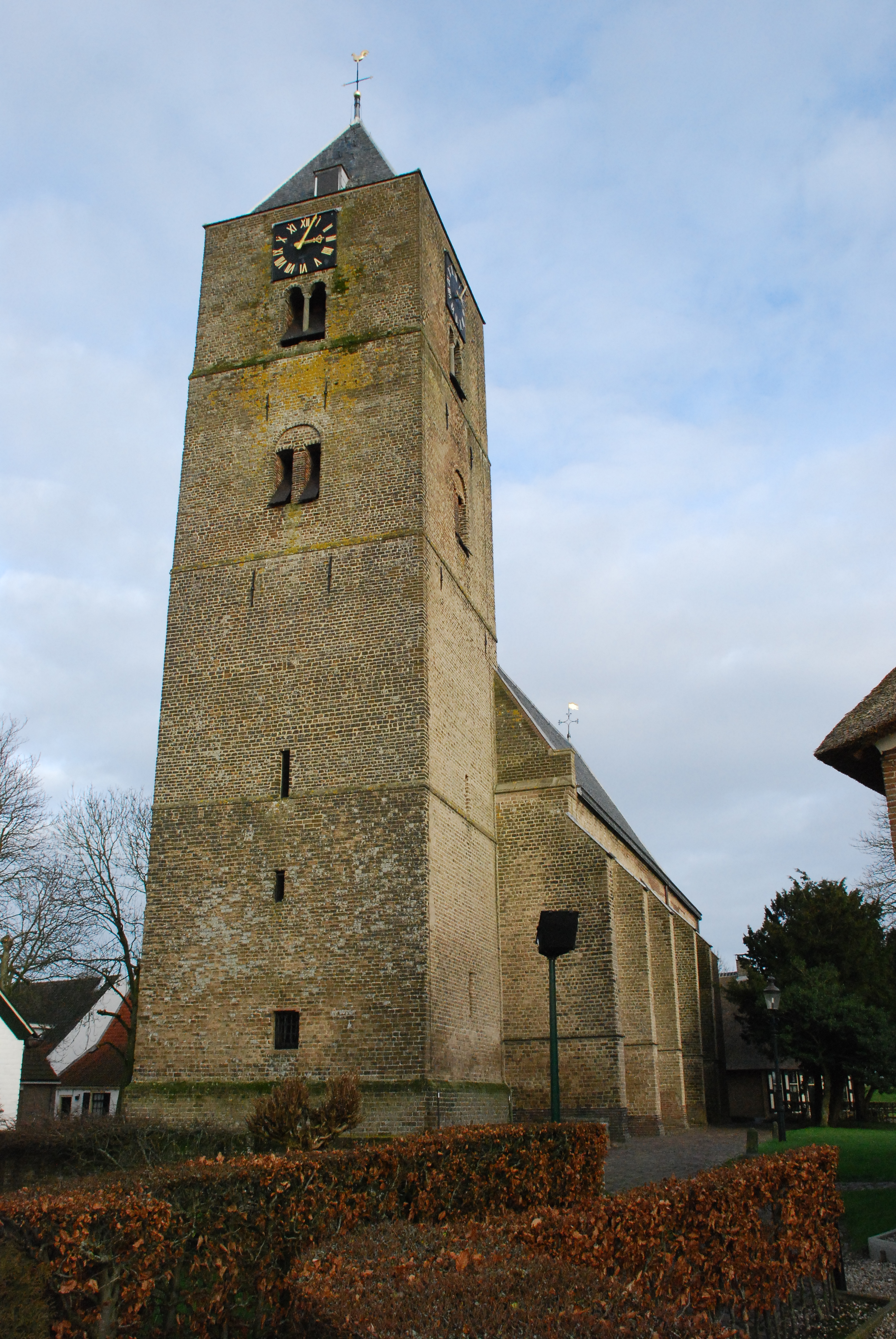
Dutch Reformed church

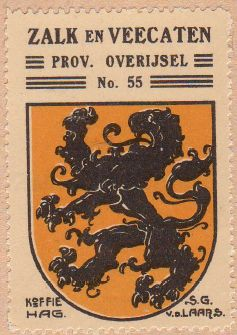
Seal of the former municipality Zalk en Veecaten

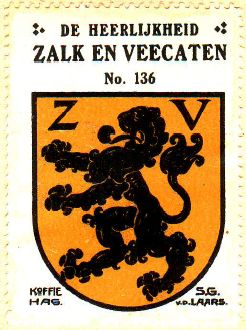
Seal of the fiefdom Zalk en Veecaten
