= Provincial road N764 (Netherlands) =

Road in the Netherlands

Provincial highway 764
- Provinciale weg 764
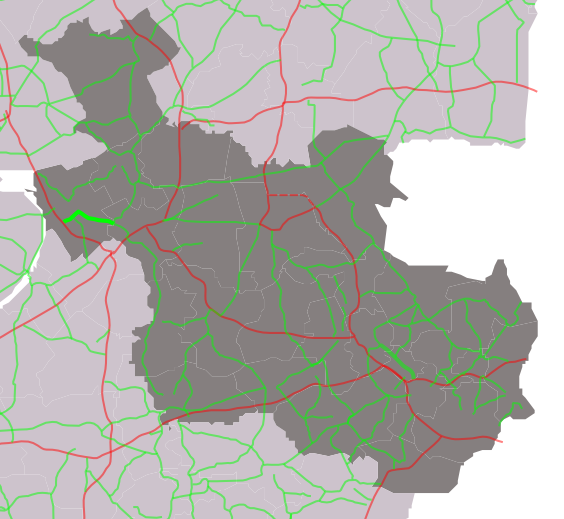

Major junctions
- West end: N 50 in Kampen
- N 765 in IJsselmuiden

- East end: N 331 in Zwolle

Location
- Country: Kingdom of the Netherlands
- Constituent country: Netherlands
- Provinces: Overijssel
- Municipalities: Kampen, Zwolle

Highway system
- Roads in the Netherlands; Motorways; E-roads; Provincial; City routes

Provincial road N764 (N764) is a road connecting Rijksweg 50 (N50) in Kampen with N331 near Zwolle.

== Major intersections ==
The entire route is in Overijssel Province.

Municipality	km	mi	Destinations	Notes
Kampen	0.000	0.000	N 50 – Overijssel	
Kampen			N 765 – IJsselmuiden	
Zwolle			N 331 – Zwolle	
1.000 mi = 1.609 km; 1.000 km = 0.621 mi
