= List of highways numbered 758 =

The following highways are numbered 758:

== Canada ==
- Alberta Highway 758
- Saskatchewan Highway 758

== United States ==
- SR 758
- MS 758
- SR 758 (former)
- PR-758

== India ==
- National Highway 758

Preceded by 757	Lists of highways 758	Succeeded by 759
