= List of highways numbered 760 =

Route 760, or Highway 760, may refer to:

== Canada ==
- Alberta Highway 760
- New Brunswick Route 760

== Costa Rica ==
- National Route 760

== Netherlands ==
- Provincial road N760 (Netherlands)

== United Kingdom ==
- A760 road

== United States ==
- KY 760
- LA 760
  - LA 760-1
  - LA 760-2
- MD 760
- MS 760
- SR 760
- PA 760

Territories

- Puerto Rico Highway 760

Preceded by 759	Lists of highways 760	Succeeded by 761
