= Poldertoren =

Coordinates: 52°42′35″N 5°45′3″E

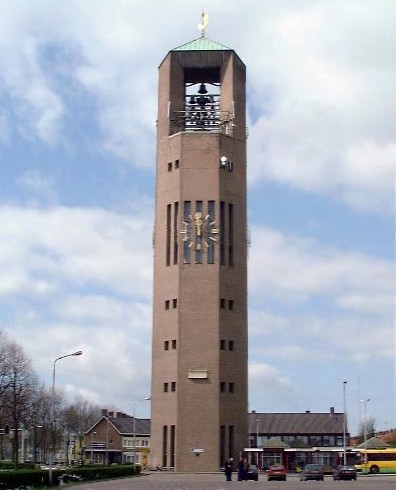
The Poldertoren in Emmeloord

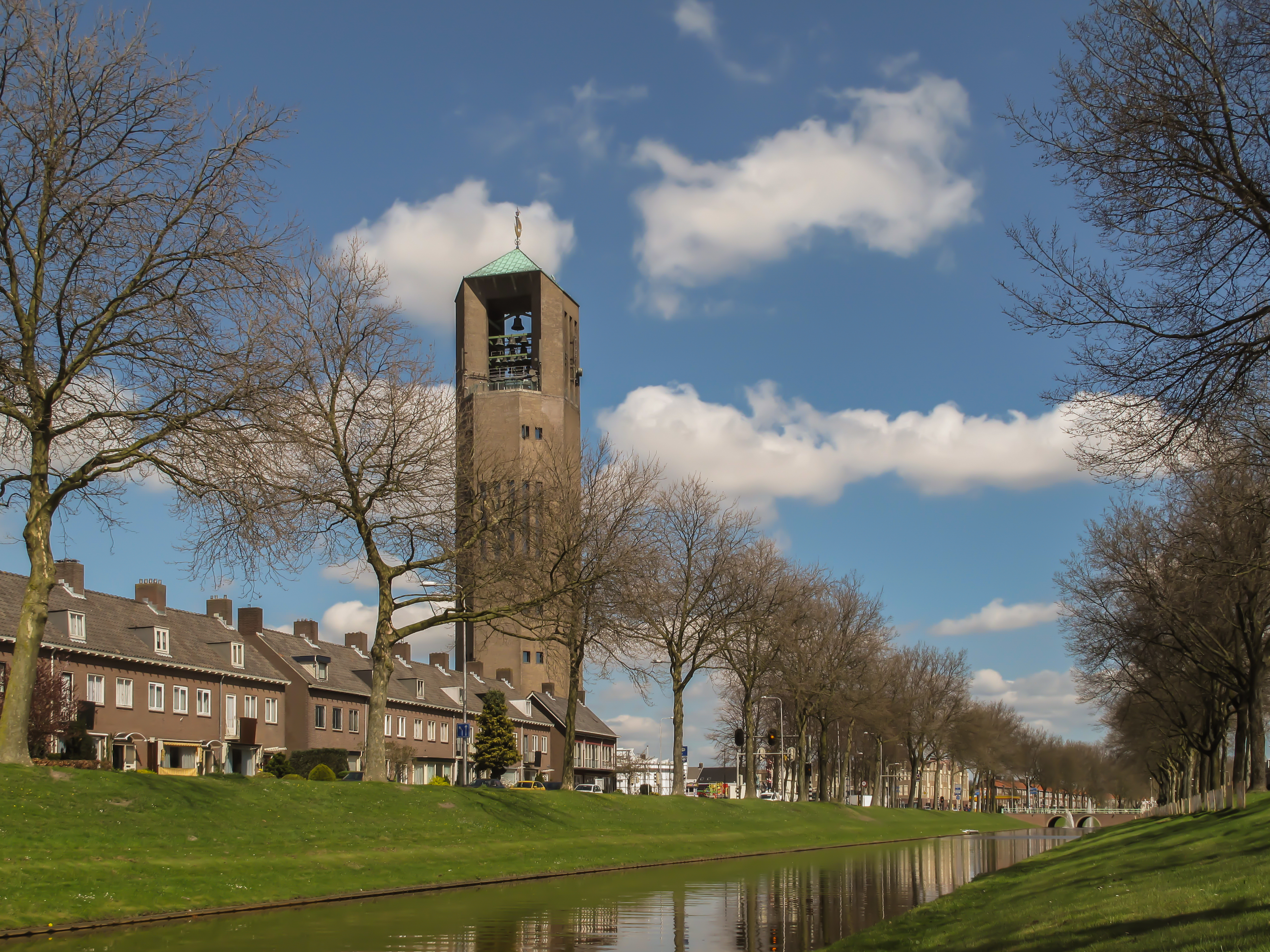
Emmeloord, tower (de Poldertoren) in the street

The Poldertoren is a water tower at the town center of Emmeloord, Netherlands. The Dutch name Poldertoren could be translated as Polder Tower. The 65-meter tower was built in 1959 and has a large carillon. The tower is no longer in use as a water tower. The owner of the tower was the water company, Vitens, but since 2005 the municipality of Noordoostpolder has owned the tower.

A replica of this watertower exists in Japan.

== Details ==
The tower measures 65.3 meters in height with a weather vane on top bringing the total height to 70.5 meters. Visitors can climb the 243 steps up to a height of 43.4 meters. The Poldertoren has a 13.4 meter diameter. The water storage capacity is 1.850 m^{3}. Building materials for the tower included 1,220 m^{3} of concrete, 185 metric tons of steel, 600,000 bricks, 624 metric tons of cement and 7,200 drainpipes.

== Architects ==
- J.W.H.C. Pot (Architectenbureau Pot en Pot-Keegstra) (1955–1959)
- H. van Gent (1950–1959)

== History ==
In an early design of Emmeloord it was decided to build a tower at the central square of the town. The tower in the heart of the Noordoostpolder symbolizes unity of the Noordoostpolder and can be seen from all locations in the Noordoostpolder. The tower is not related to any church, because churches could dominate the others with this tower.

The idea to build a tower originates in the need of a water tower in the Noordoostpolder. The water company of Overijssel decided to offer a prize for the best design of a new water tower in December 1950. The tower had to include a carillon and a visitor platform. The tower had to symbolize unity of the new Noordoostpolder and it had to emphasize Emmeloord as the central town. The design Utillis of the Amsterdam architect H. van Gent was chosen. J.W.H.C. Pot helped him to develop the detailed design.

== The carillon ==
A.D. van Eck had dedicated himself to placing a carillon in the new tower. The result of a fundraising campaign among the Noordoostpolder population was a ring of 48 bells. Every village offered its own bell. The heaviest bell is 2382 kilograms, the lightest weighs 9.9 kilograms.

All bells have inscriptions:

- Juliana Regina (Juliana of the Netherlands) (the heaviest bell)
- Lely; Fait ce que dois, advienne que pourra
- A.D. van Eck, bouwmeester NOP; Facta non Verba
- De Arbeid; Ora et Labora
- De Vrede; Post Secundum Anno Tertio Decimo
- Concordia Res Parvae Crescunt
- Ratio Omnia Vincit
