= List of highways numbered 759 =

The following highways are numbered 759:

== Canada ==
- Alberta Highway 759

== United States ==
- I-759
- SR 759 (an extension of I-759)
- SR 759 (former)
- LA 759
- MD 759
- Route 759
- SR 759
- CR 759
- PR-759

Preceded by 758	Lists of highways 759	Succeeded by 760
