= Provincial road N760 (Netherlands) =

Road in the Netherlands

Provincial highway 760
- Provinciale weg 760
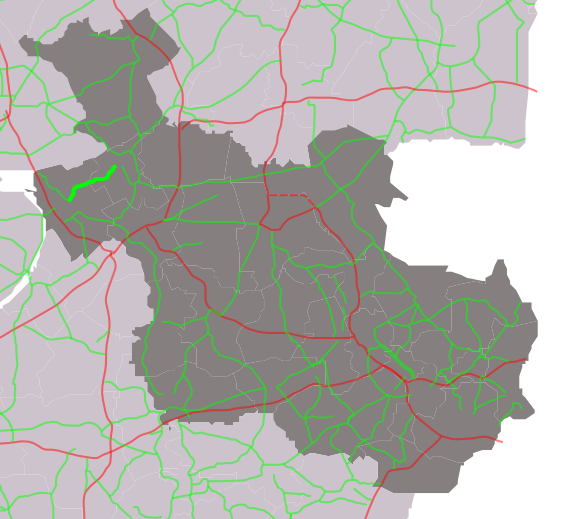

Major junctions
- South end: N 765 in IJsselmuiden
- To: Genemuiden

Location
- Country: Kingdom of the Netherlands
- Constituent country: Netherlands
- Provinces: Overijssel
- Municipalities: Kampen, Zwartewaterland

Highway system
- Roads in the Netherlands; Motorways; E-roads; Provincial; City routes

Provincial road N760 (N760) is a road connecting N765 in IJsselmuiden with the town of Genemuiden.

== Classification ==
The N760 is classified as a provincial road (denoted by the "N" prefix) within the Dutch road network.

== Numbering System ==
The N760 is part of the numbering range 175-400, which is used for important provincial roads in the Netherlands.
