= Ens, Netherlands =

Ens
- Village
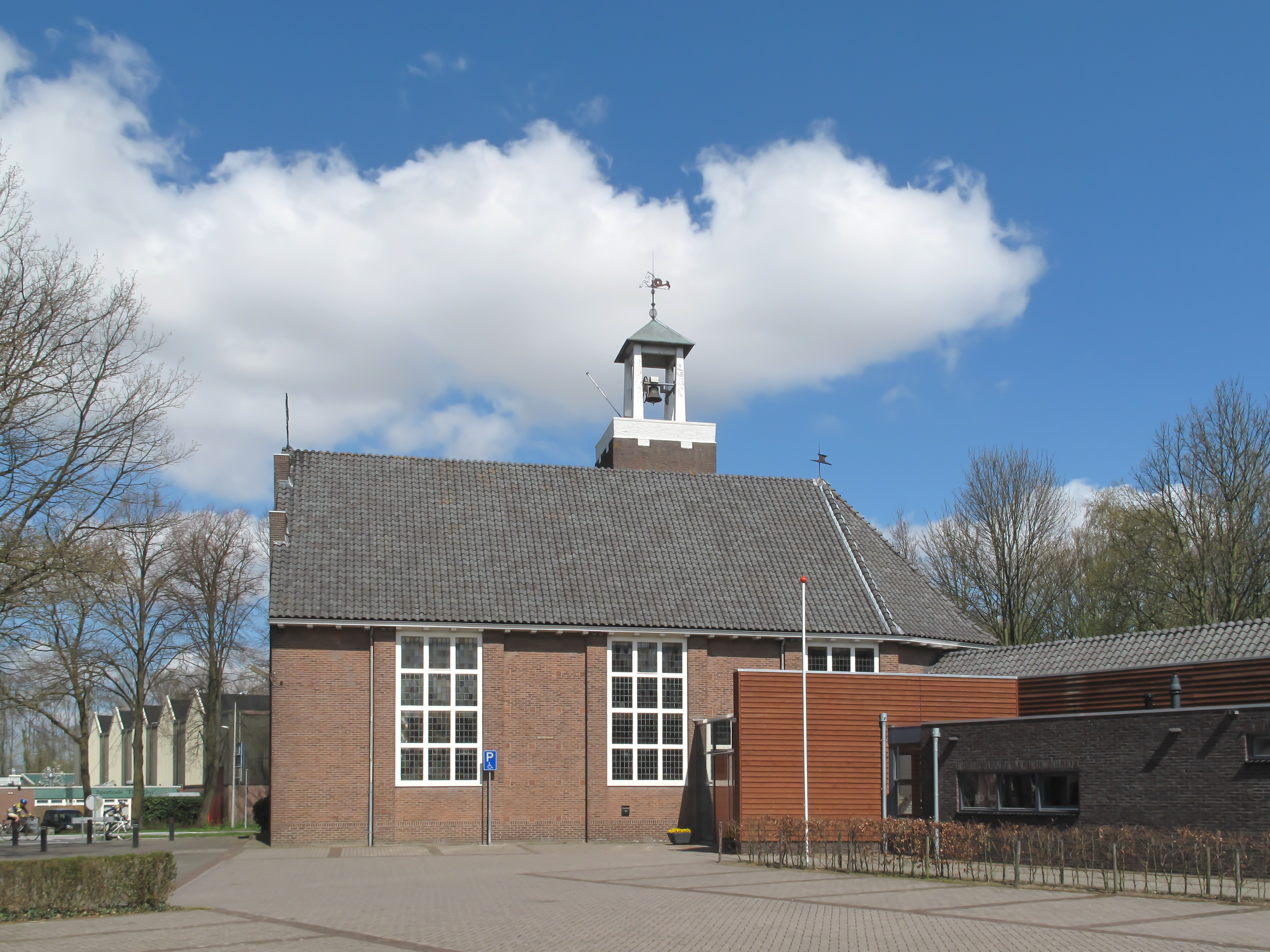
- Protestant Church

- Flag Coat of arms

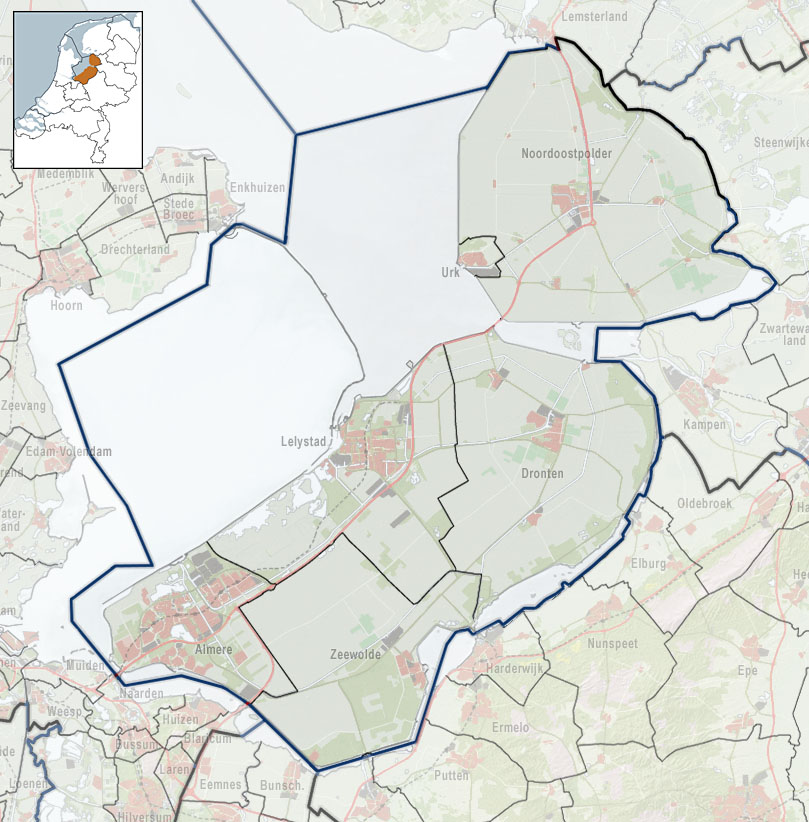
- Location within Flevoland Location within Netherlands
- Coordinates: 52°38′13″N 5°49′32″E
- Country: Netherlands
- Province: Flevoland
- Municipality: Noordoostpolder
- Established: 1948

Area
  - Total: 42.76 km^{2} (16.51 sq mi)
- Elevation: −1.9 m (−6.2 ft)

Population (2021)
  - Total: 3,110
  - Density: 72.7/km^{2} (188/sq mi)
- Time zone: UTC+1 (CET)
  - Summer (DST): UTC+2 (CEST)
- Postal code: 8307
- Dialing code: 0527

Ens is a village in the Dutch province of Flevoland. It is a part of the municipality of Noordoostpolder, and lies about 10 km southeast of Emmeloord.

In 2019, Ens had 3,065 inhabitants. The built-up area of the village was 0.57 km², and contained 846 residences.

== History ==
The village was first mentioned in 1950 as Ense. It is named after a flooded village on the island of Schokland. The name probably means "duck lake".

On 10 November 1941, the first barracks were placed in Ens for the poldering of the Noordoostpolder. Ens was founded in 1948 as one of the new settlements. The plan of the village by Theo Verlaan was approved in 1949. The central core is a green axis with the church on the east side, a pub-restaurant on the west side and shops on the northern and southern side.

In 1948, wooden houses were bought in Austria as temporary housing, however they are still in use. The same, a little wooden Catholic chapel was built, and is still standing beside the Our Lady of Perpetual Help Church. The church is nowadays in use as a library and neighbourhood centre.

There is a white watchtower near the N50 road. It was built between 1956 and 1957 for recreational purposes.

== Public transportation ==
There is no railway station in Ens, but the nearest station is Kampen. There is a regular bus service 141 (Zwolle - Kampen - Ens - Emmeloord - Urk).

== Gallery ==
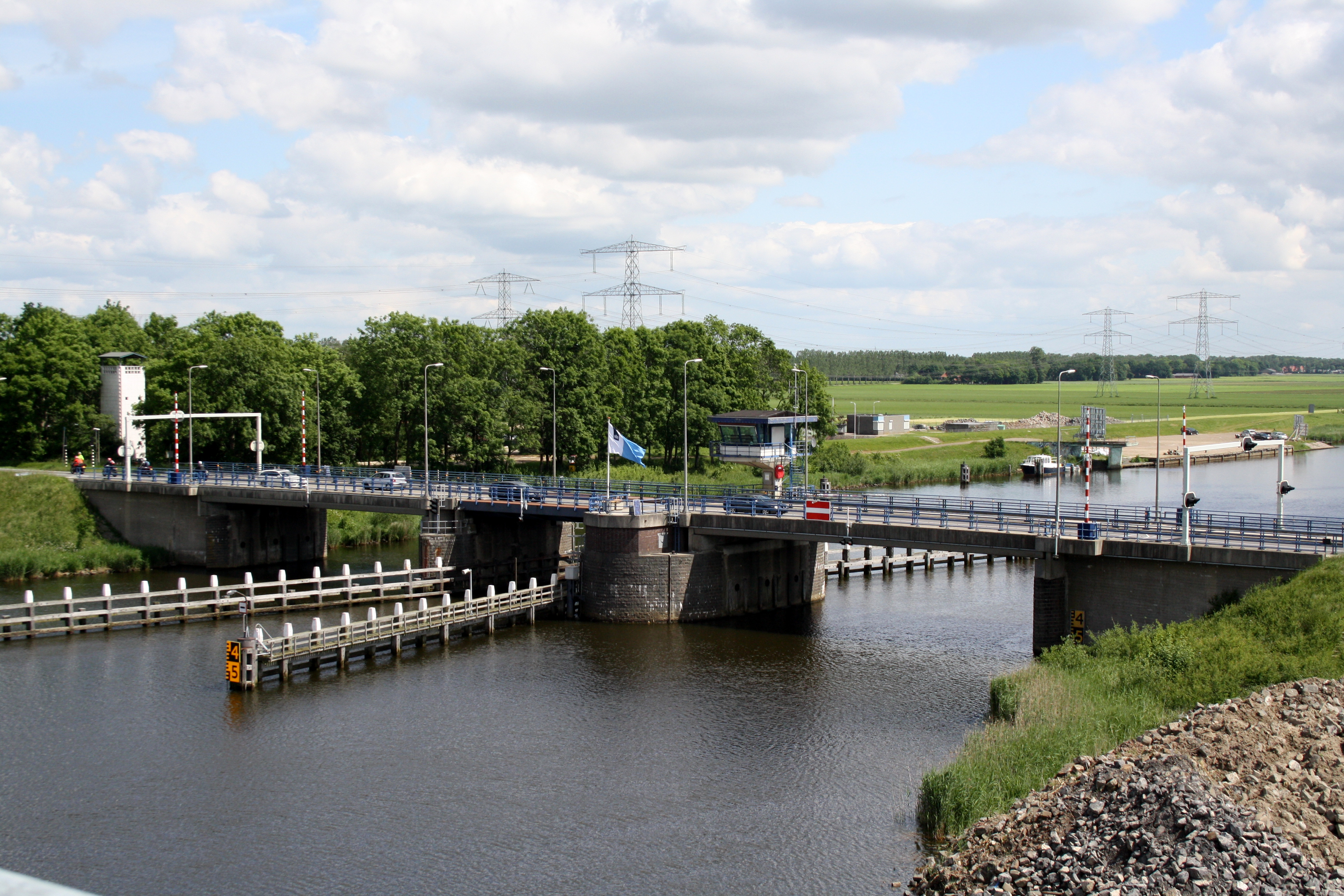
Ramspol Bridge

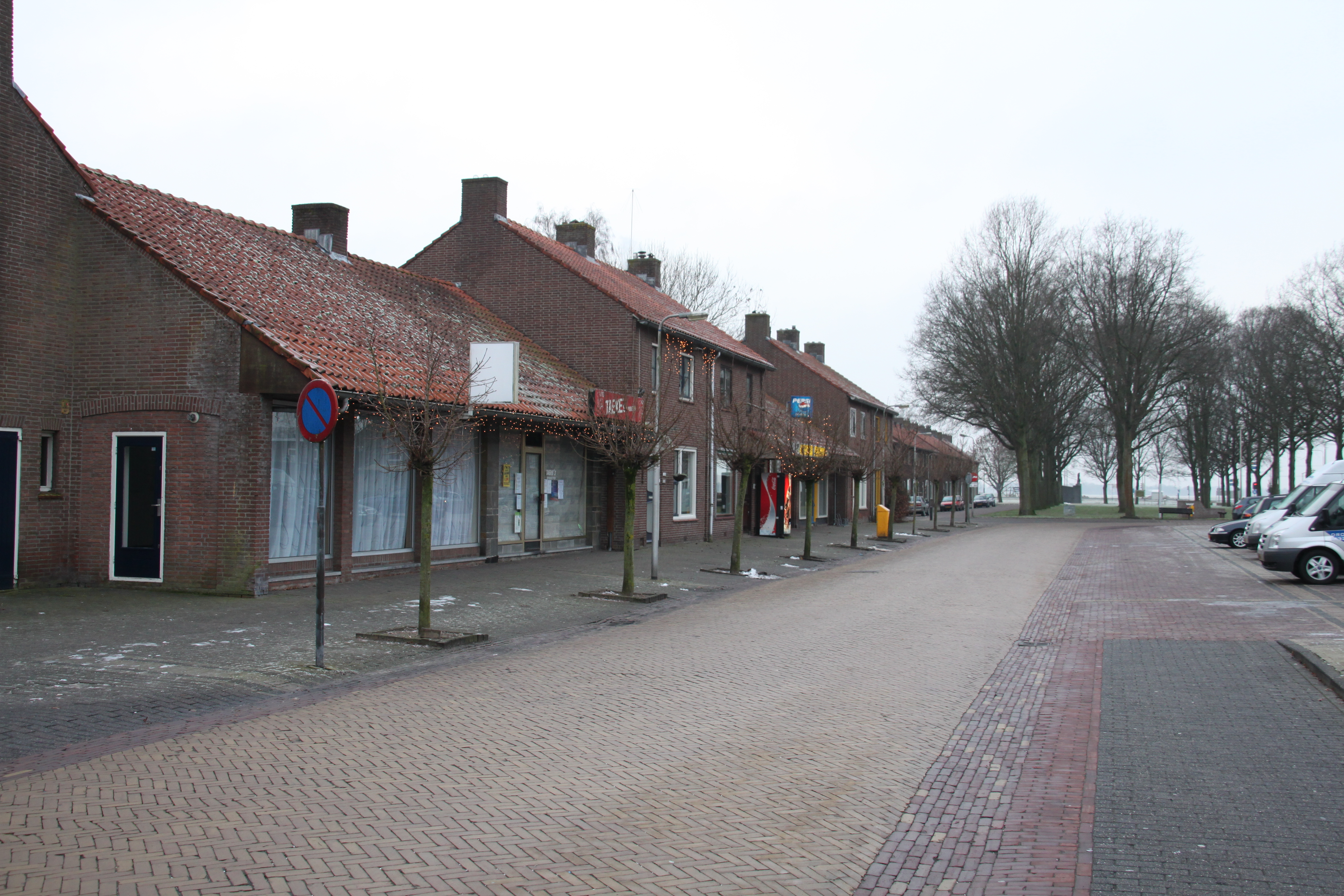
Village square

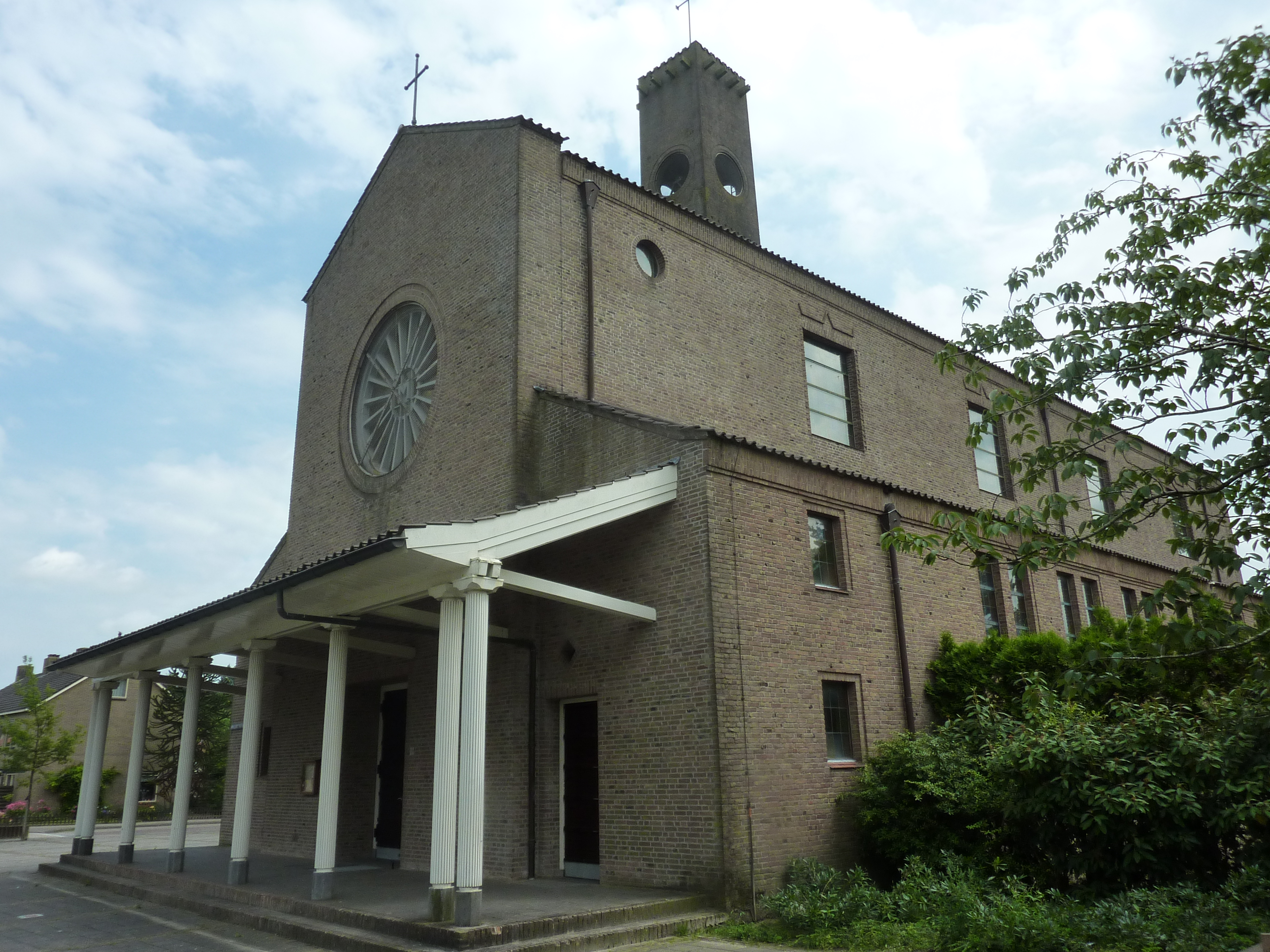
Catholic church

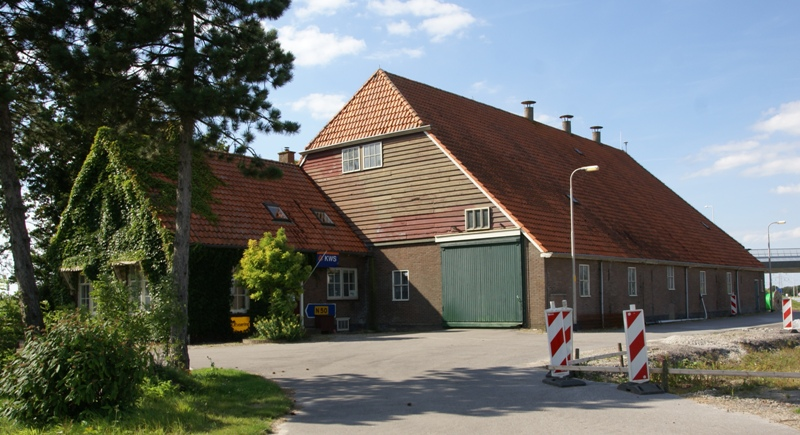
Farm in Ens
