= Emmeloord =

- Town
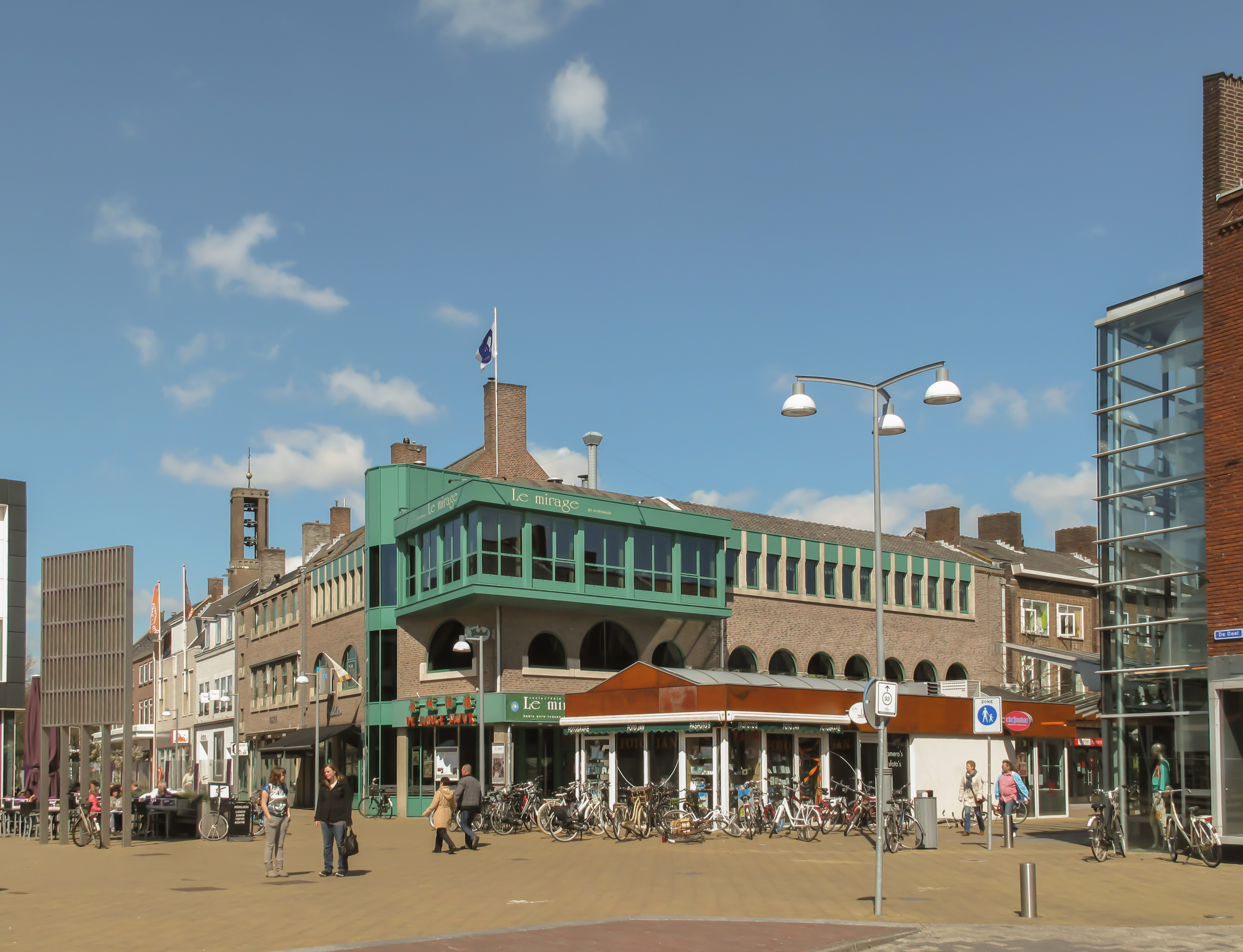
- View from the town square De Deel on the Beursstraat (left) and the west-entrance of the shopping street Lange Nering, 2013

- Flag

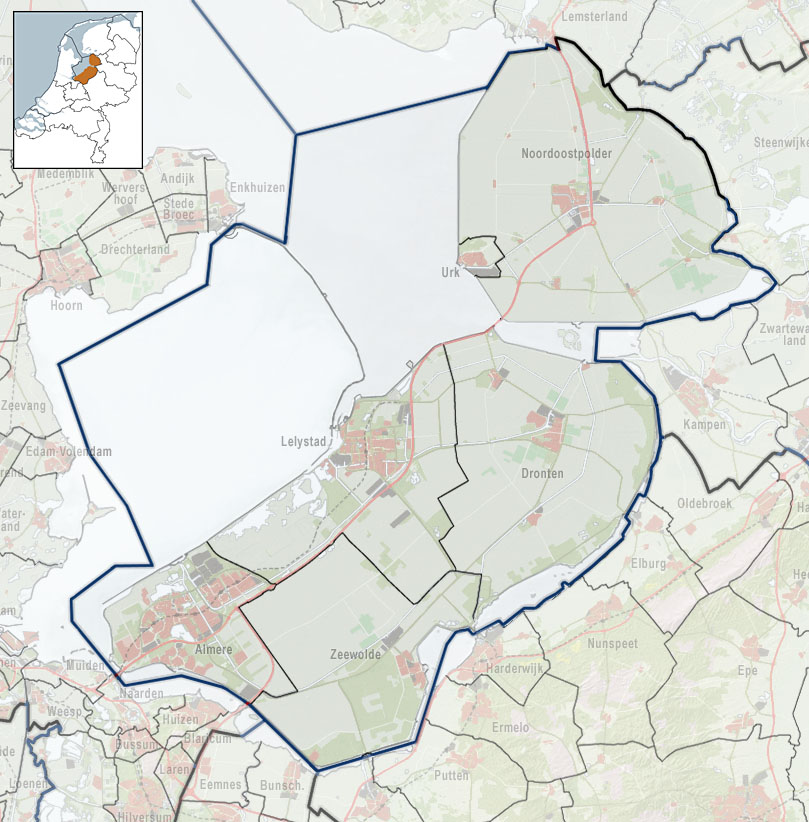
- Location of Emmeloord in the province of Flevoland
- Coordinates: 52°42′35″N 5°45′3″E
- Country: Netherlands
- Province: Flevoland
- Municipality: Noordoostpolder

Population (1 January 2019)
  - Total: 26,055

Emmeloord (West Frisian: Emmeloard; Latin: Civitas Fortunae Emmeloordis)is the administrative centre of the municipality of Noordoostpolder, Flevoland, Netherlands. In 2019, it had a population of 26,055.

== Overview ==
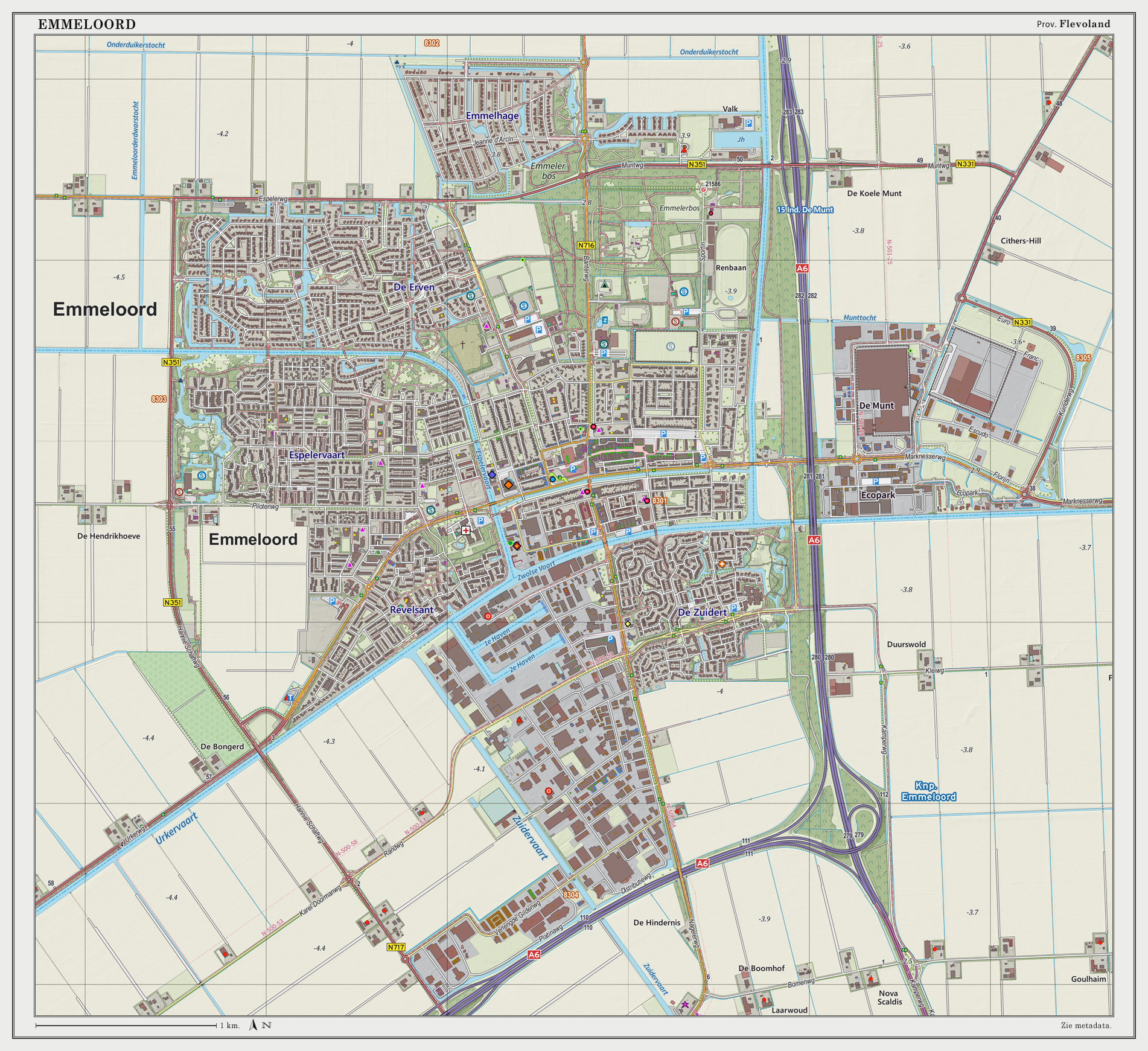
Topographic map of Emmeloord, March 2014

At the heart of the Noordoostpolder, where the three main drainage canals Lemstervaart, Urkervaart and Zwolsevaart intersect, is the city of Emmeloord (1943). Named after an abandoned village on the island of Schokland, Emmeloord is located in a polder: land reclaimed from the IJsselmeer, which earlier was part of the sea. Planned from the outset to be the first and the only major town of the polder, it is the local government and services centre.

The first district built was called the Onkruidbuurt ("weed neighbourhood"). Street names were chosen from the weeds that were growing all around on the former sea floor, like reed (Rietstraat), thistle (Distelstraat) and sea aster (Zeeasterstraat).

From Emmeloord three main canals take their water to three pumping stations: the Buma near Lemmer (north), the Smeenge at Vollenhove (south-east) and the Vissering on Urk (south-west).

In the center of Emmeloord there is a 65-meter-tall (213 ft) water tower called the Poldertoren. The tower is the central point of the Noordoostpolder and could be seen from almost every location in the early years of the Noordoostpolder, when there were no tall trees. In Japan there is a replica of this water tower.

== Surrounding villages ==
Ten smaller villages, conceived more as agricultural communities, were planned in a wide circle around Emmeloord, with the distances between them determined to be easily reachable by bicycle. In order from first to last, these settlements were Marknesse (1946), Ens (1948), Kraggenburg (1948), Luttelgeest 1950, Bant (1951), Rutten (1952), Creil (1953), Nagele (1954), Espel (1956) and finally Tollebeek (1956).

== Transportation ==
There is no railway station in Emmeloord, but bus connections exist to the nearest stations. Only relevant rail connections are mentioned in below table:

Station	Destinations	Bus route to station
Lelystad Centrum, Lelystad	Almere, Amsterdam, Amsterdam Airport Schiphol, The Hague, Rotterdam	Bus 214
Kampen, Kampen	Zwolle	Bus 141, 641
Zwolle, Zwolle	Emmen, Almelo, Enschede, Deventer, Arnhem, 's-Hertogenbosch, Amersfoort, Utrecht	Bus 71, 641
Heerenveen, Heerenveen	Leeuwarden	Bus 315, 324 (Qliner)

The connection with Heerenveen, Drachten and Groningen is ensured by Arriva Qliner intercity buses.

Emmeloord lies at the intersection of the A6 motorway and the N50 dual carriageway, providing a rapid connection to Amsterdam, Zwolle and Friesland.

== Gallery ==
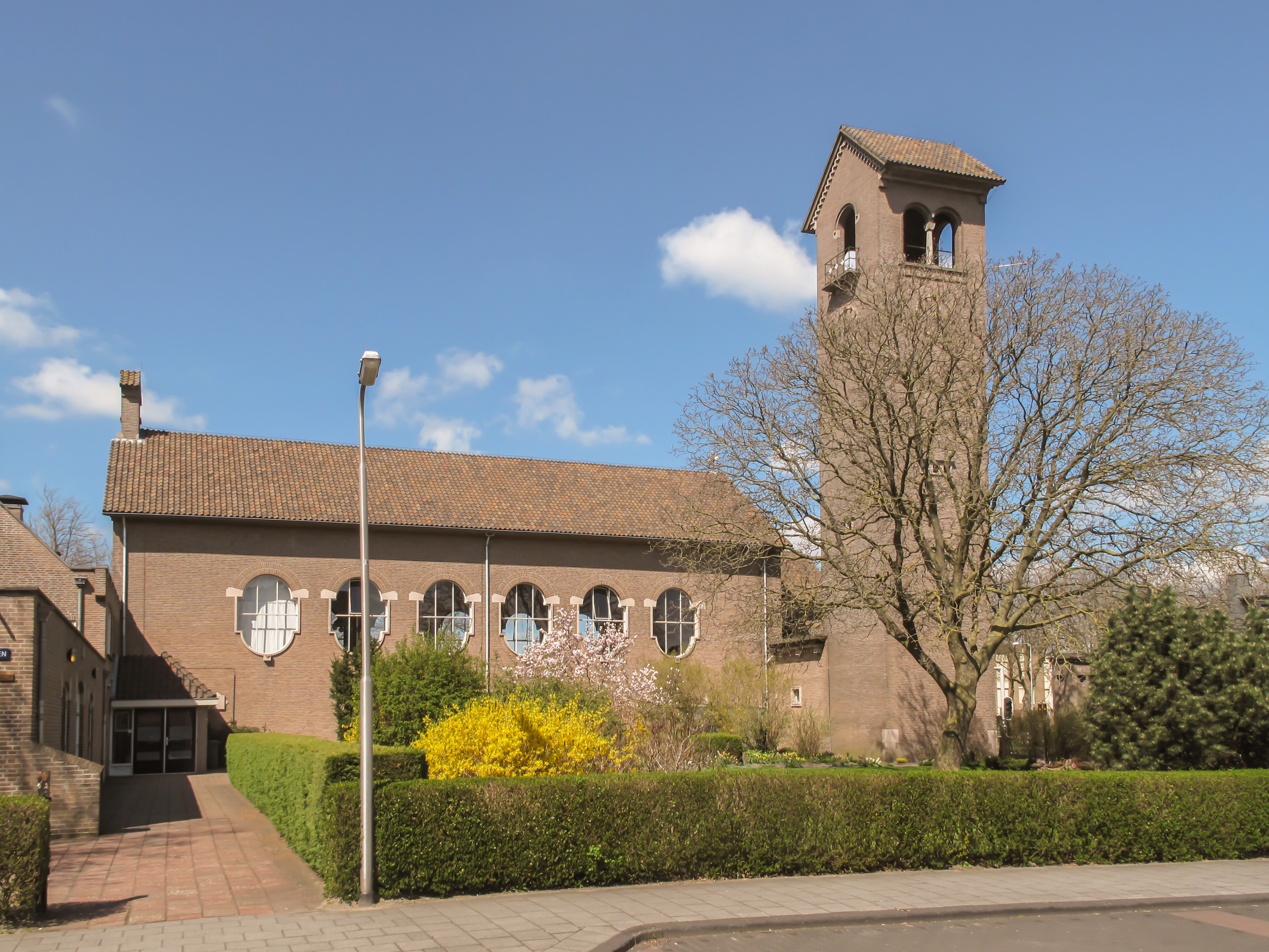
Reformed church De Hoeksteen

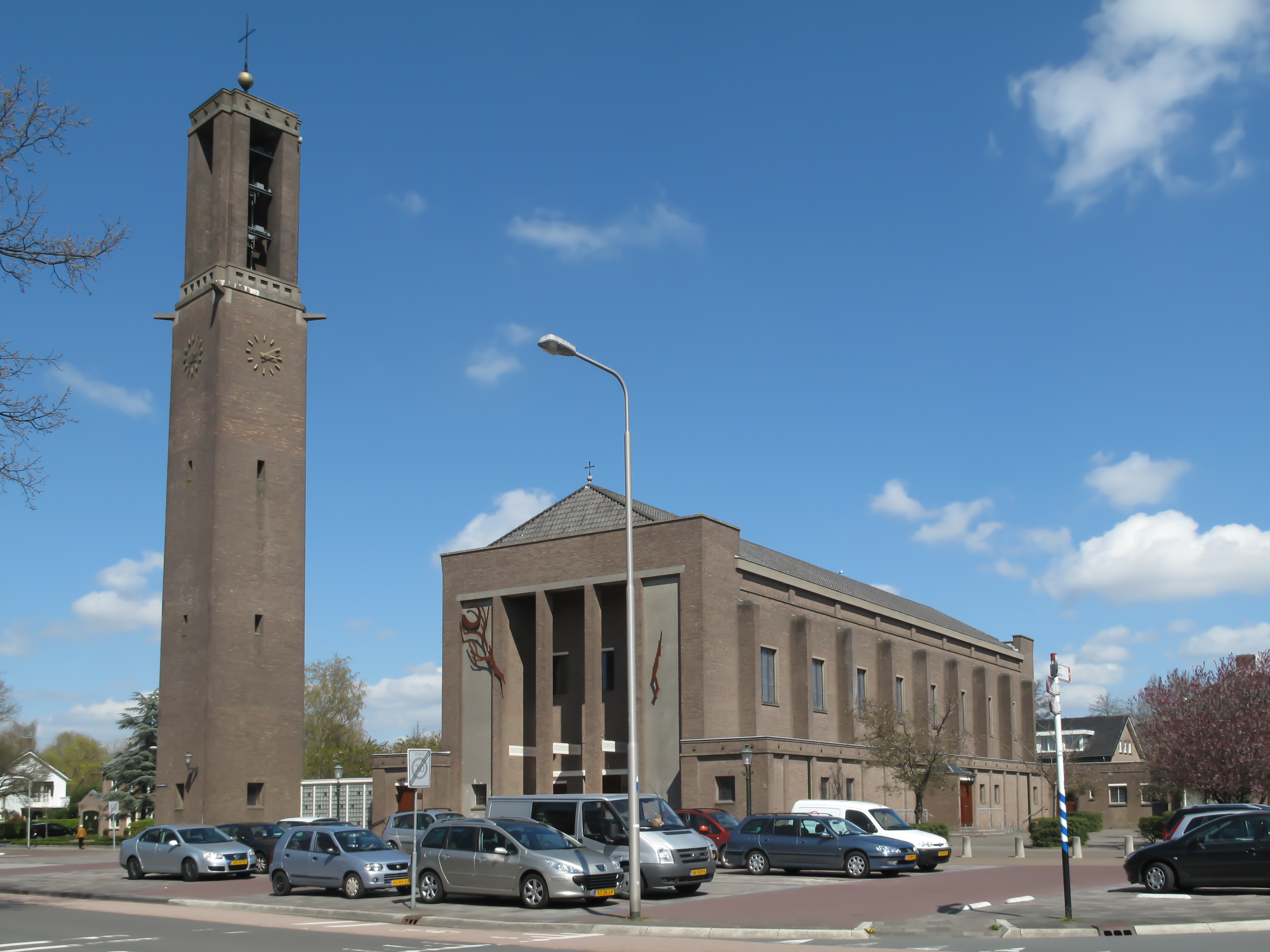
Roman Catholic church Heilige Michael

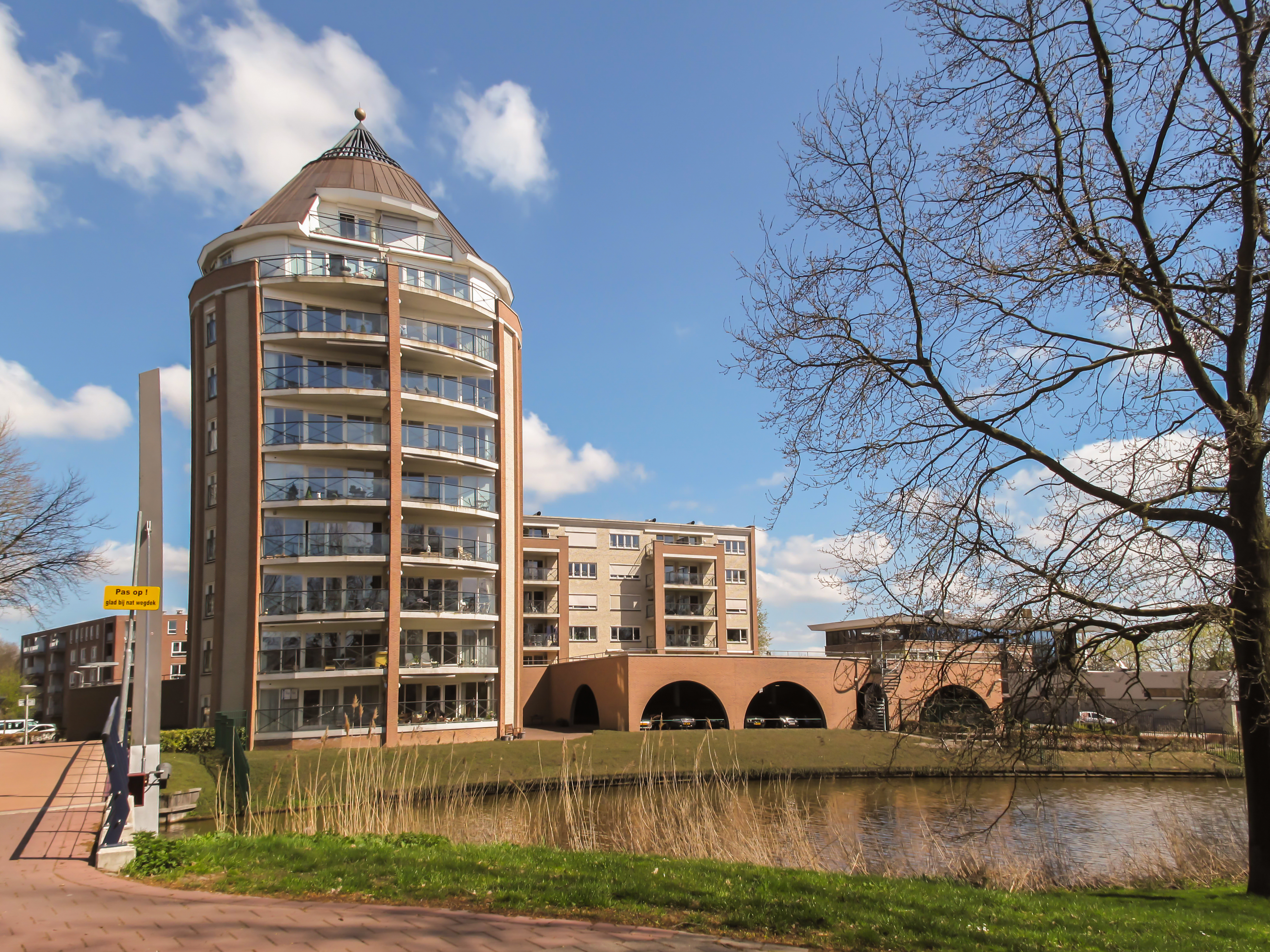
View of a pencil shaped apartment building adjacent to canal Espelervaart

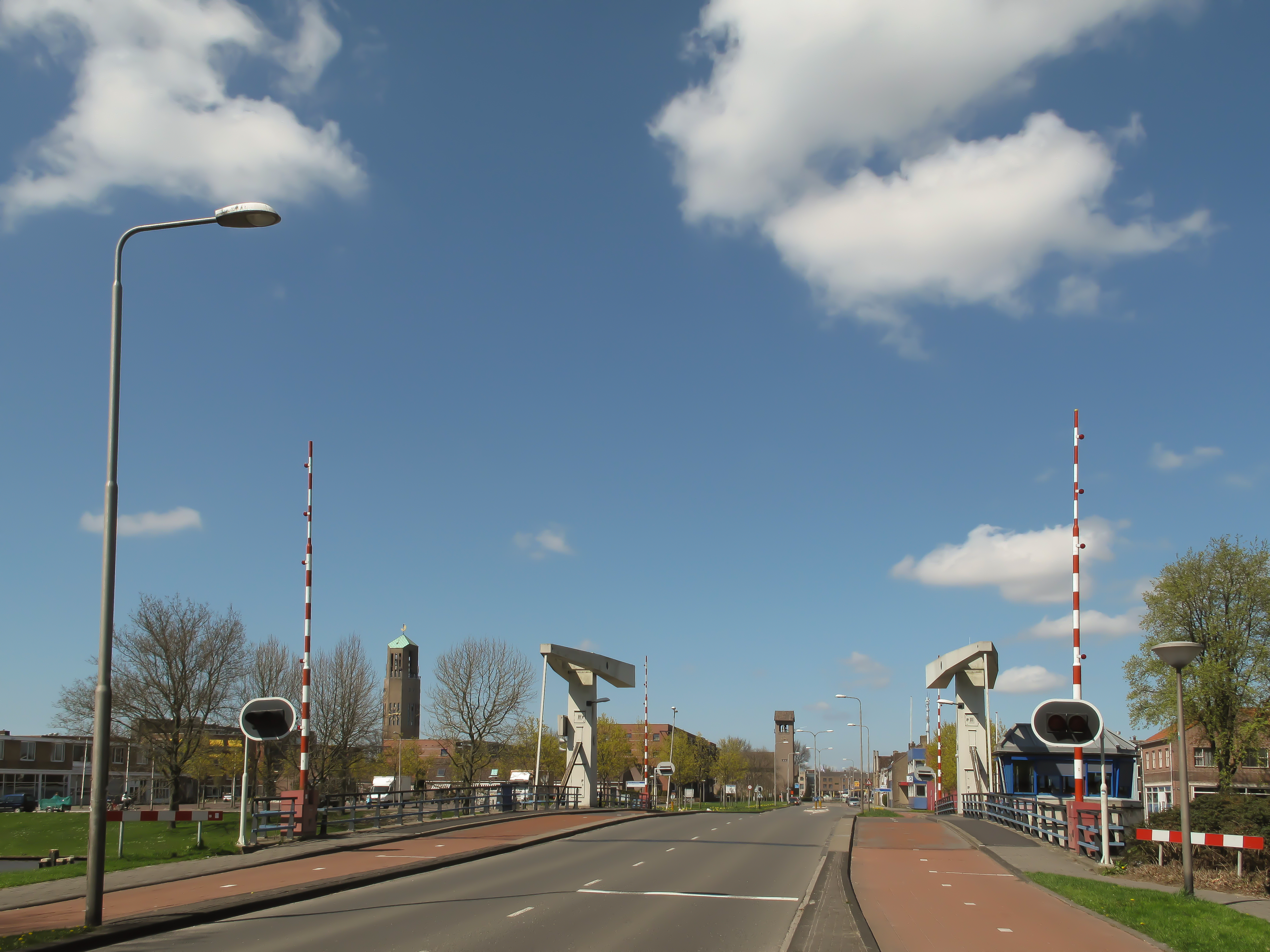
View of a bridge over canal Urkervaart

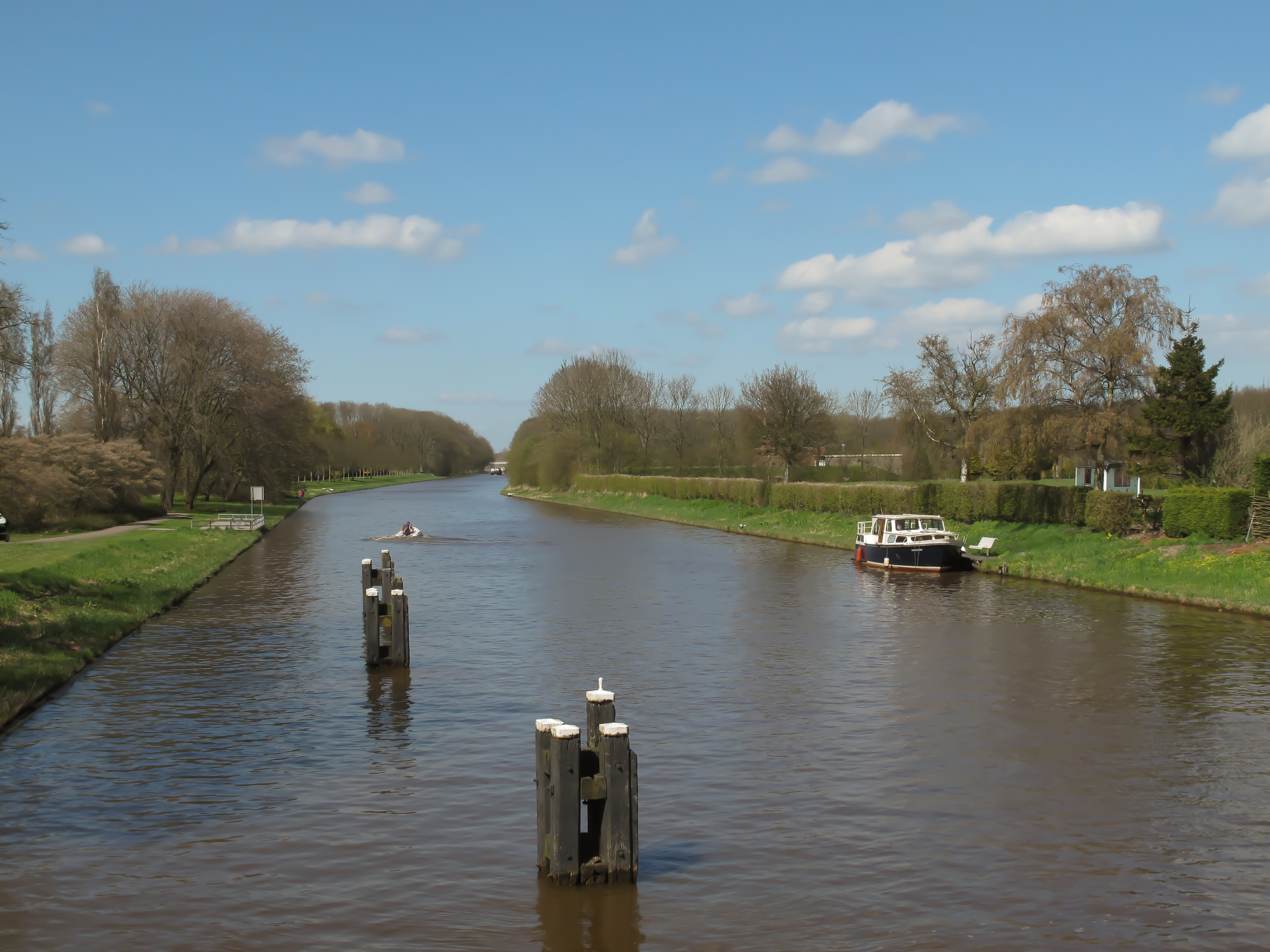
Canal Lemstervaart

== See also ==
- Urk
- Zuiderzee Works
