= IJsselmuiden =

- Town
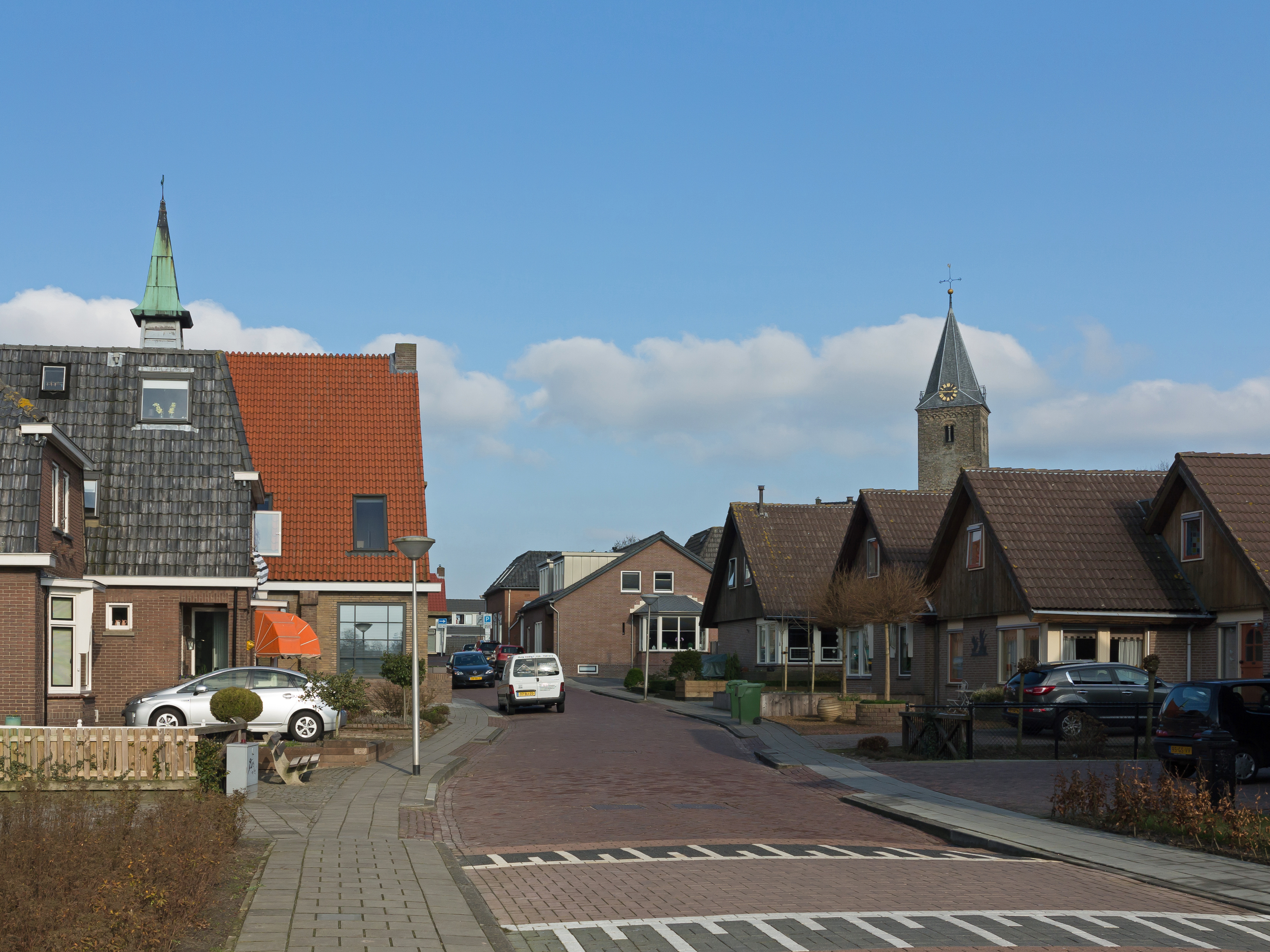
- The two church towers of IJsselmuiden

- Flag Coat of arms

- Location in the Netherlands IJsselmuiden (Netherlands)
- Coordinates: 52°34′N 5°55′E
- Country: Netherlands
- Province: Overijssel
- Municipality: Kampen

Area
  - Total: 17.04 km^{2} (6.58 sq mi)
- Elevation: 1 m (3.3 ft)

Population (2021)
  - Total: 12,455
  - Density: 730.9/km^{2} (1,893/sq mi)
- Time zone: UTC+1 (CET)
  - Summer (DST): UTC+2 (CEST)
- Postal code: 8271
- Dialing code: 038

IJsselmuiden is a town in the Dutch province of Overijssel. It is located in the municipality of Kampen, northeast of that city across the river IJssel.

IJsselmuiden was a separate municipality until 2001, when it became a part of Kampen. IJsselmuiden has an old church, dating back to 1200.

== History ==
It was first mentioned in 1133 as "de Islemuthen", and means "the mouth of the IJssel river". It was a dike village along a former arm of the IJssel which became a little stream after the Mastenbroek was completed. In 1646, a bridge was built to Kampen. The Dutch Reformed Church dates from 1200, but was extensively rebuilt in 1911 to 1912. In 1840, it was home to 520 people.

In 1865, Kampen railway station was opened. It was built on the side of IJsselmuiden, and was originally planned to be located there. However it was decided to build the station 350 metres to the west on a plot of land belonging to Kampen.

== Notable people ==
- Ank Bijleveld (born 1962), politician and former minister of defence
- Henk de Velde (born 1949), seafarer known for long solo voyages

== Gallery ==
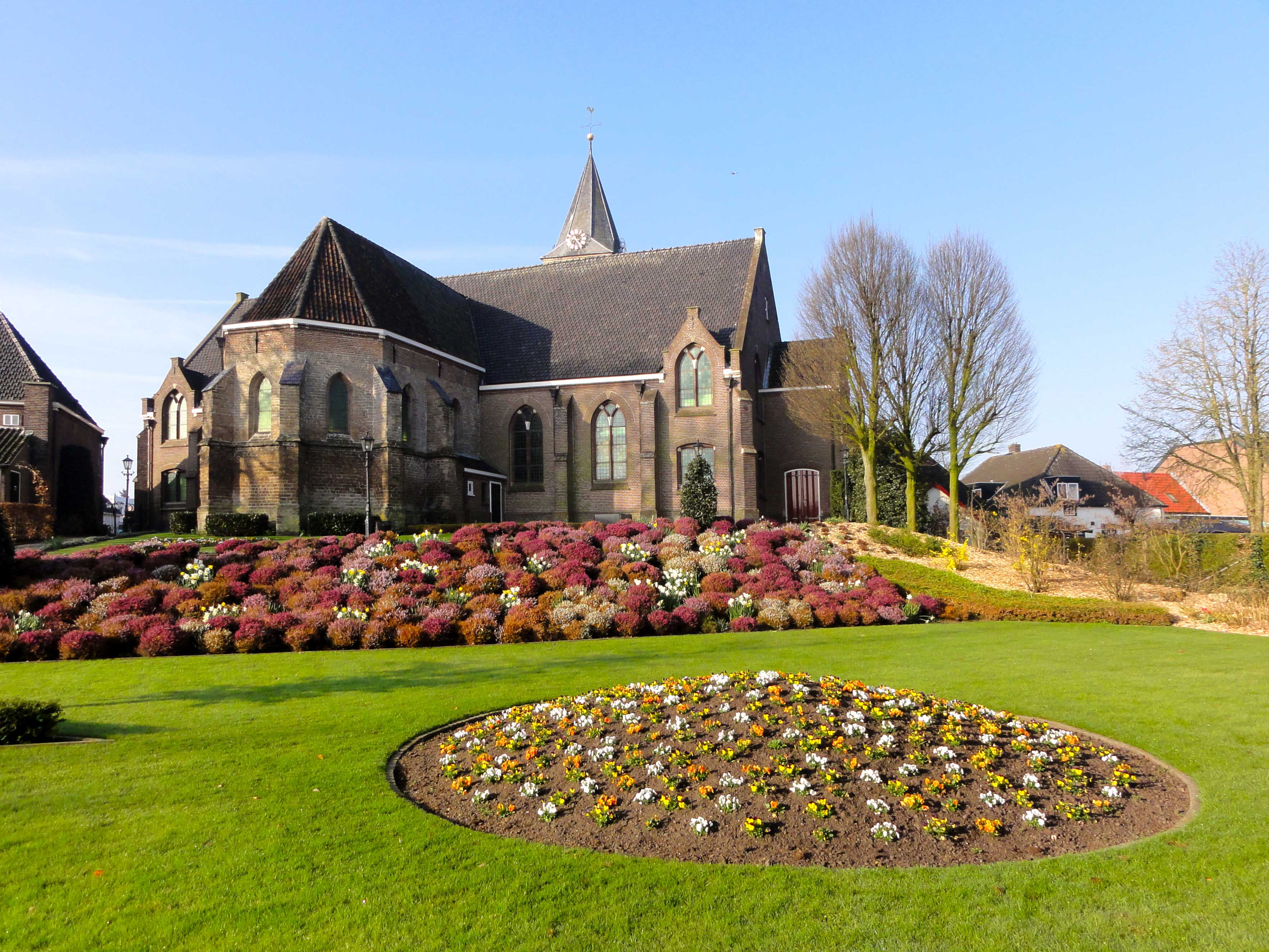
Saint Crispijn Church

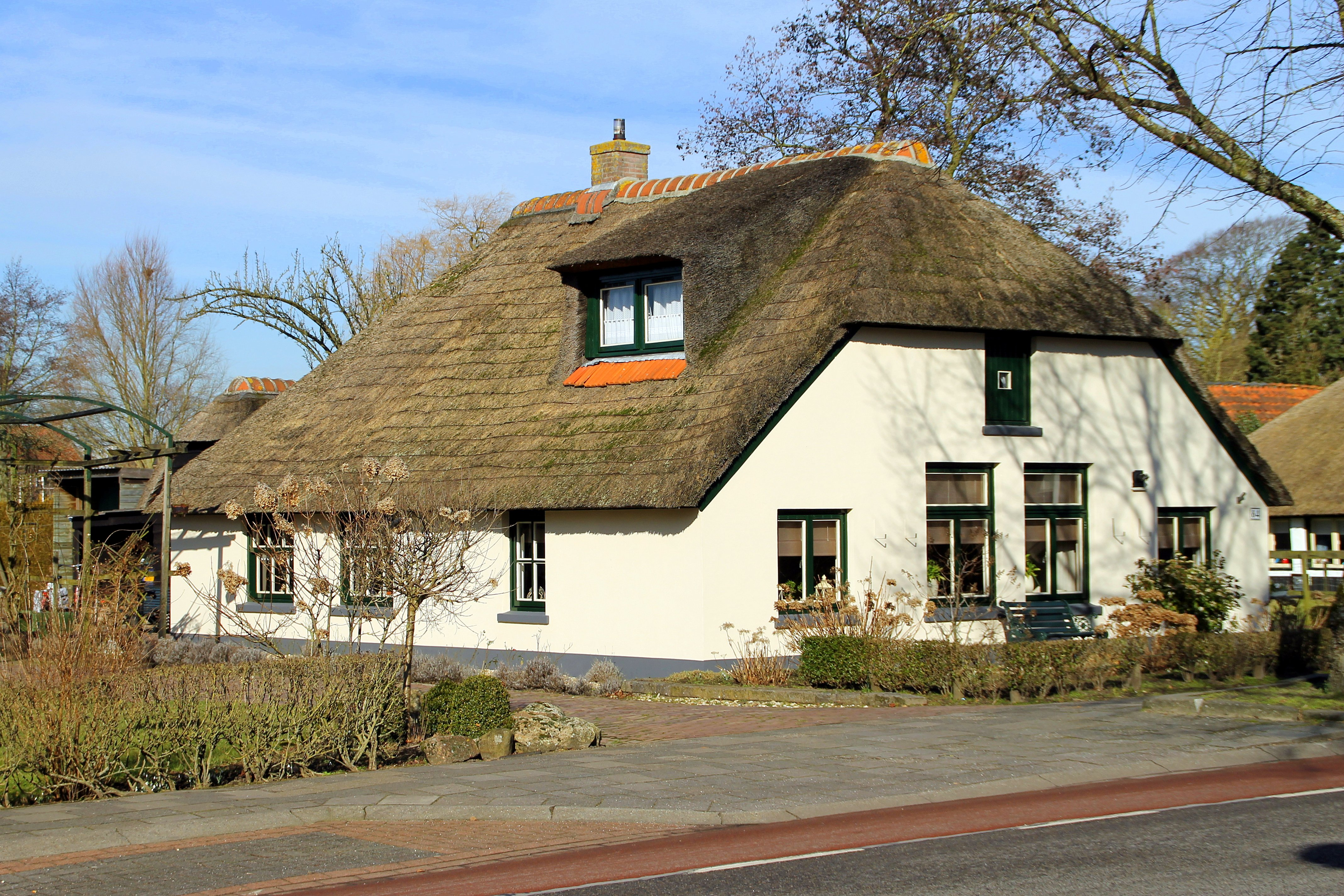
Farm in IJsselmuiden
