= Godsheide =

Village in Hasselt, Belgium

- Village
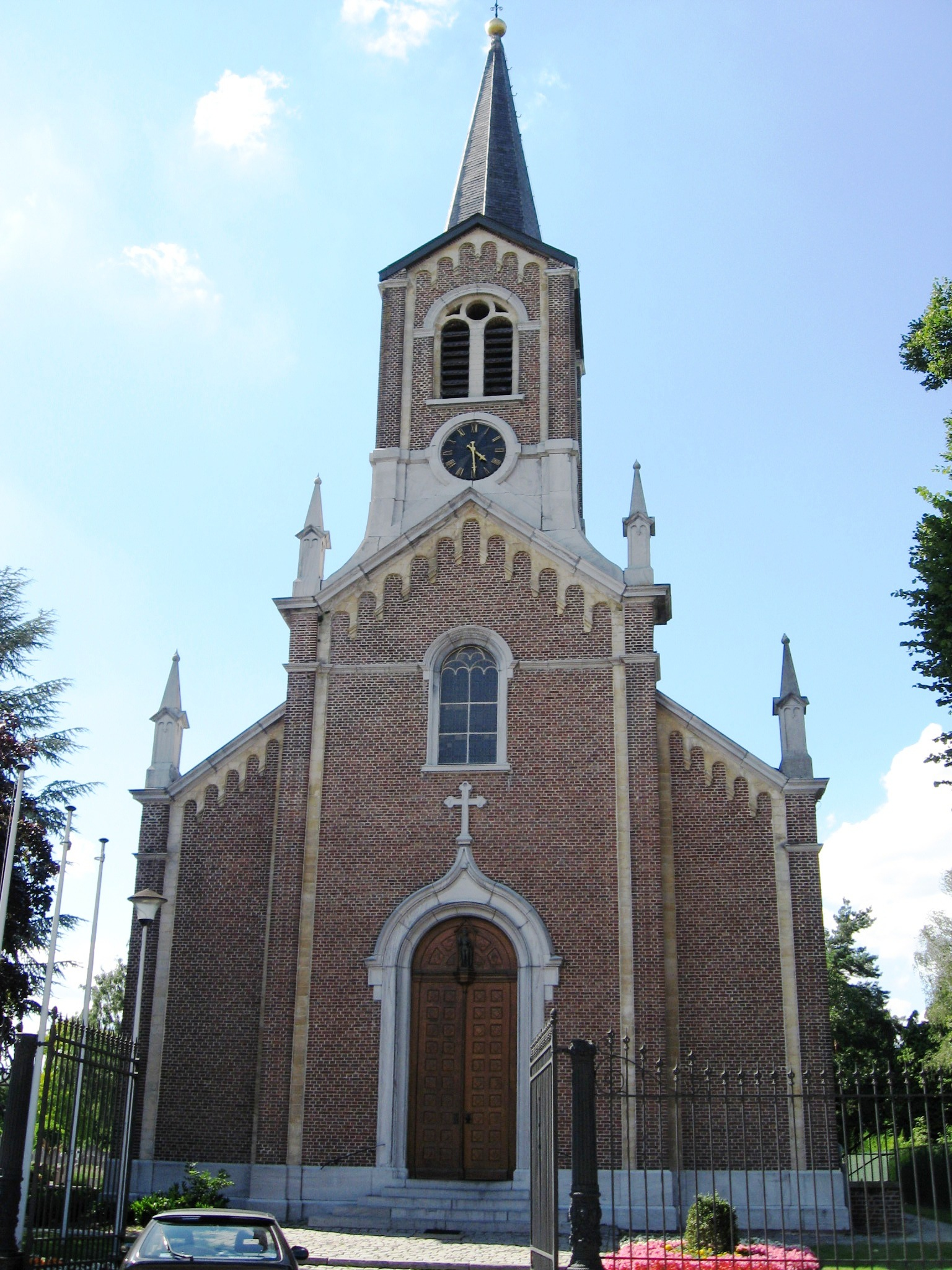
- The parish church of Godsheide.

- Location in Belgium
- Coordinates: 50.937°N 5.385°E
- Country: Belgium
- Community: Flemish Community
- Province: Limburg
- Municipality: Hasselt

Area
  - Total: 5.28 km^{2} (2.04 sq mi)

Population (2021)
  - Total: 2,426
  - Density: 459/km^{2} (1,190/sq mi)
- Time zone: CET

Godsheide (Dutch pronunciation: [ˈɣɔtsˌɦɛidə]) is a village and Catholic parish within the north-eastern corner of the Belgian city of Hasselt, in the province of Limburg.

Between the village and the main town of Hasselt there are several large modern developments - the Hasselt golf club, the Grenslandhallen entertainment centre, the Limburg provincial government buildings, and the Kinepolis cinema complex.

Apart from the rest of Hasselt, it is bounded by Diepenbeek on the east, and Bokrijk, a part of Genk, to the north. The parish is divided in northern and southern sections by the waterways and roads which both run east–west through it. The Albert Canal separates the modern main village from a northern section, "Vosseberg", which has access to the main village via two bridges, while the southern extreme of the parish, "Wolske", lies to the south of the Demer and the nearby Universiteitslaan main road. At the southern extremity, Godsheide touches the old steenweg (old main road) between Hasselt and Maastricht, which also runs in an east–west manner.

Godsheide VV is the local soccer club, and there is a local catholic primary school and a scouts group.

== Etymology ==
Although the modern spelling and standard pronunciation sounds like it means "God's heath" this is not the origin of the name of Godsheide. The original meaning is thought to be shown more clearly by the spelling Goetschey, found on a map from 1549, and the dialect pronunciation of the name, which is Gooètskè: instead of God's heide (heath) the second component was related to modern Dutch scheiding (a separation or dividing). The division being referred to was apparently that between the medieval territory of the County of Loon, which included Hasselt, and Diepenbeek, which was not part of Loon, but rather formed a detached part of various other entities over the centuries, especially the Prince-bishopric of Liège and the Duchy of Brabant.

== History ==
The oldest roads were made in the 14th century, and were the Bos, Kiezel, and Wolskes streets in the south of the parish, and the Brugbemdenstraat which is now in the golf course. The two ponds on Borggravevijverstraat, in the north of the parish near Bokrijk, were already there in the 15th century. The old main "steenweg" road between Hasselt and Genk, which passes through the northern "Vosseberg" part of the parish (separated from the church by the modern canal) exists since the 18th century.

Godsheide became a catholic parish in 1845 and in 1853 work began on the church which is dedicated to Onze-Lieve-Vrouw van Bezoeking (Our beloved lady of visitation). The modern church has an old gate which was once used elsewhere in Hasselt as an entrance port to the city. In 1869, the church received an organ which was protected in 1975 and fully restored between 1995 and 1998.

=== The Albert Canal ===
The Albert Canal (Albertkanaal) was made between 1930 and 1939, and runs through Godsheide. There is a canal lock in Godsheide.

On 26 June 1939 part of the dike gave way on the new canal, which had recently been checked, and 1,3 million m³ water flowed out, killing the man who had been checking it.

The first bridge over the canal in Godsheide was blown up by the Belgian army during the invasion of Germany at the beginning of World War II.

=== Drowning disaster ===
During the war there was a simple ferry float constructed over the canal that was pulled across by steel cable. On 14 February 1941 a teacher had 57 children and 4 adults board on the south side, with the intention of crossing to get the tram in Genk. The float started to sink and as a result 35 children and 2 adults drowned. The town worker who operated the ferry was blamed and imprisoned. The teacher left the region.

== Godsheide and its bridges ==
=== The Cable-stayed bridge ===
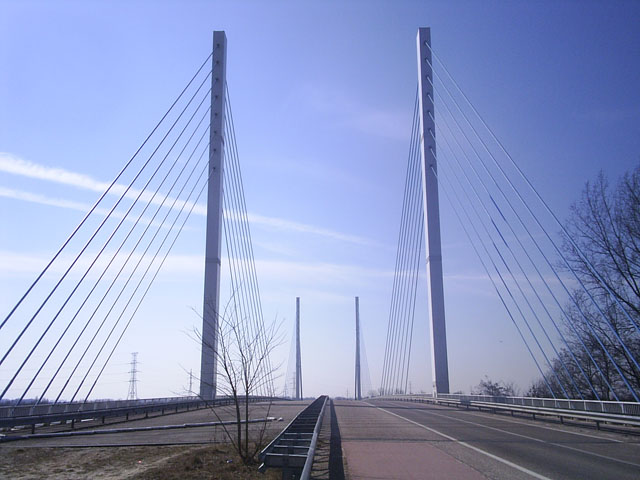
The tuibrug in Godsheide.

Godsheide has very large a cable-stayed bridge over the canal, which was intended to be part of a new link connecting Hasselt and Genk. The project was vetoed by Genk. Only one side of the bridge is maintained for the small amount of traffic it serves, and there is a very wide bicycle path.

=== The bridge for the A24 ===
In Limburg there has been debate since the 1970s about building a main road running north–south from Eindhoven in the Netherlands to Huy in French-speaking Liège Province to the south, and to be known as the A24. An agreement was reached in 1972, but never went ahead. The original plans would have meant the bridge should have been about 1 kilometre (0.62 mi) to the west of the cable-stayed bridge, nearer to the centre of Hasselt.

== Annual procession ==
In Godsheide the kermis in held on the Sunday after 18 July. On this day the scouts carry the image of Saint Odilia in procession through the town.
