= List of protected heritage sites in Diepenbeek =

This table shows an overview of the protected heritage sites in the Flemish town Diepenbeek. This list is part of Belgium's national heritage.

Object	Status^{?}	Year/architect	Town/section	Address	Coordinates	Number^{?}	Image
Farm ^{(nl)} ^{(fr)}			Diepenbeek	Alfons Jeurissenstraat 2	50.92129°N 5.41386°E	21478 Info	
Closed farm ^{(nl)} ^{(fr)}			Diepenbeek	Alfons Jeurissenstraat 91	50.92917°N 5.42270°E	21480 Info	
Farm ^{(nl)} ^{(fr)}	Yes		Diepenbeek	Bentstraat 19	50.90324°N 5.44335°E	21481 Info	
Farm ^{(nl)} ^{(fr)}	Yes		Diepenbeek	Bouquetstraat 48	50.90385°N 5.39835°E	21484 Info	
Farm "Boeketwinning" ^{(nl)}	Yes		Diepenbeek	Bouquetstraat 72	50.90245°N 5.39400°E	21485 Info	
Farm ^{(nl)} ^{(fr)}			Diepenbeek	Bouquetstraat 147	50.89920°N 5.38296°E	21486 Info	
Farm ^{(nl)} ^{(fr)}	Yes		Diepenbeek	Crijtringstraat 13	50.89072°N 5.42342°E	21488 Info	
Chapel of the Crijt ^{(nl)} ^{(fr)}			Diepenbeek	Watertorenstraat	50.89475°N 5.42084°E	21489 Info	
Originally farm, now only house about 1900 ^{(nl)} ^{(fr)}	Yes		Diepenbeek	Dautenstraat 131	50.92852°N 5.44309°E	21491 Info	
Brewers house Schoofs, now police station ^{(nl)}			Diepenbeek	Dorpsstraat 11	50.90878°N 5.42055°E	21494 Info	
house ^{(nl)}			Diepenbeek	Dorpsstraat 13	50.90853°N 5.42071°E	21495 Info	
House, now two dwellings ^{(nl)}			Diepenbeek	Dorpsstraat 20	50.90770°N 5.42076°E	21497 Info	
House, now two dwellings ^{(nl)}			Diepenbeek	Dorpsstraat 22	50.90770°N 5.42076°E	21497 Info	
House ^{(nl)}			Diepenbeek	Dorpsstraat 28	50.90753°N 5.42106°E	21499 Info	
House ^{(nl)}			Diepenbeek	Dorpsstraat 30	50.90753°N 5.42106°E	21499 Info	
Mansion ^{(nl)} ^{(fr)}			Diepenbeek	Dorpsstraat 32	50.90765°N 5.42134°E	21500 Info	
Semi-closed farm house ^{(nl)} ^{(fr)}			Diepenbeek	Ganzestraat 30	50.89357°N 5.39242°E	21503 Info	
House, originally elongated farm ^{(nl)} ^{(fr)}			Diepenbeek	Ganzestraat 85	50.89626°N 5.37735°E	21504 Info	
Farm ^{(nl)} ^{(fr)}			Diepenbeek	Ganzestraat 92	50.89641°N 5.37631°E	21505 Info	
Rooiermeulen ^{(nl)}	Yes		Diepenbeek	Ginderoverstraat 32	50.92902°N 5.39969°E	21506 Info	
"Baanwinning" closed farm ^{(nl)}			Diepenbeek	Grendelbaan 32	50.90433°N 5.43318°E	21507 Info	
Farm ^{(nl)} ^{(fr)}			Diepenbeek	Grendelbaan 46	50.90353°N 5.43455°E	21508 Info	
Farm 1922 ^{(nl)} ^{(fr)}			Diepenbeek	Grendelbaan 98	50.90084°N 5.44167°E	21511 Info	
Farm ^{(nl)} ^{(fr)}			Diepenbeek	Helstraat 79	50.88102°N 5.42327°E	21513 Info	
Farm ^{(nl)} ^{(fr)}			Diepenbeek	Hoog Keizel 34	50.91122°N 5.38043°E	21514 Info	
Farm "Op den Alversberg" ^{(nl)}			Diepenbeek	Hoog Keizel 48	50.91032°N 5.37695°E	21515 Info	
Farm "Op den Alversberg" ^{(nl)} ^{(fr)}			Diepenbeek	Hoog Keizel 50	50.91032°N 5.37695°E	21515 Info	
former farm house XX ^{(nl)} ^{(fr)}			Diepenbeek	Hovenstraat 62		21516 Info	
elongated farm ^{(nl)} ^{(fr)}			Diepenbeek	Hovenstraat 5	50.91725°N 5.45779°E	21517 Info	
elongated farm ^{(nl)} ^{(fr)}	Yes		Diepenbeek	Jeugdstraat 25	50.91018°N 5.40900°E	21518 Info	
Closed farm ^{(nl)} ^{(fr)}			Diepenbeek	Kapelstraat 60	50.91141°N 5.41327°E	21521 Info	
Forge, corner house ^{(nl)} ^{(fr)}			Diepenbeek	Kapelstraat 9	50.90907°N 5.41859°E	21523 Info	
double house type ^{(nl)}			Diepenbeek	Kapelstraat 30	50.90975°N 5.41757°E	21524 Info	
Double House ^{(nl)} ^{(fr)}			Diepenbeek	Kapelstraat 55	50.90977°N 5.41517°E	21527 Info	
Farmer Burger House ^{(nl)} ^{(fr)}			Diepenbeek	Kapelstraat 59	50.90991°N 5.41472°E	21528 Info	
Farm ^{(nl)} ^{(fr)}			Diepenbeek	Kapelstraat 87	50.91097°N 5.41163°E	21529 Info	
Long stretched farm ^{(nl)} ^{(fr)}	Yes		Diepenbeek	Keistraat 1	50.89770°N 5.44330°E	21534 Info	
elongated farm ^{(nl)} ^{(fr)}			Diepenbeek	Keistraat 50	50.89467°N 5.43928°E	21535 Info	
Farm separate components around 1900 ^{(nl)} ^{(fr)}			Diepenbeek	Keizel 122	50.90558°N 5.37328°E	21536 Info	
Farm standalone components ^{(nl)} ^{(fr)}			Diepenbeek	Keizel 137	50.90402°N 5.36905°E	21537 Info	
elongated farm ^{(nl)} ^{(fr)}	Yes		Diepenbeek	Kempenstraat 81	50.92380°N 5.42672°E	21540 Info	
Farm ^{(nl)} ^{(fr)}			Diepenbeek	Kruisstraat 25	50.89056°N 5.38023°E	21544 Info	
Farm from the 19th century ^{(nl)} ^{(fr)}			Diepenbeek	Kruisstraat 35	50.88994°N 5.38118°E	21545 Info	
Farm standalone components ^{(nl)} ^{(fr)}	Yes		Diepenbeek	Kruisstraat 36	50.88907°N 5.38068°E	21546 Info	
Farm standalone components ^{(nl)} ^{(fr)}			Diepenbeek	Kruisstraat 57	50.88850°N 5.37729°E	21547 Info	
Elongated farmhouse ^{(nl)} ^{(fr)}			Diepenbeek	Kruisstraat 81	50.89037°N 5.36927°E	21548 Info	
Farm ^{(nl)} ^{(fr)}			Diepenbeek	Kukkelbosstraat 84	50.88715°N 5.43276°E	21551 Info	
Farm standalone components ^{(nl)} ^{(fr)}			Diepenbeek	Kukkelbosstraat 86	50.88710°N 5.43305°E	21552 Info	
Farm standalone components ^{(nl)} ^{(fr)}			Diepenbeek	Kukkelbosstraat 95	50.88742°N 5.43570°E	21553 Info	
Farm standalone components ^{(nl)} ^{(fr)}			Diepenbeek	Kukkelbosstraat 104	50.88663°N 5.43643°E	21554 Info	
Closed farm XIX ^{(nl)} ^{(fr)}			Diepenbeek	Laag Keizel 2	50.90855°N 5.39619°E	21555 Info	
Farm ^{(nl)} ^{(fr)}			Diepenbeek	Lindenstraat 7		21556 Info	
Farm standalone components K.A.L. ANNO 1904 ^{(nl)} ^{(fr)}			Diepenbeek	Lutselusstraat 14	50.90954°N 5.44110°E	21558 Info	
Farm ^{(nl)} ^{(fr)}			Diepenbeek	Lutselusstraat 33	50.91095°N 5.44447°E	21559 Info	
Farm standalone components ^{(nl)} ^{(fr)}	Yes		Diepenbeek	Lutselusstraat 83	50.91211°N 5.45567°E	21560 Info	
elongated farm ^{(nl)} ^{(fr)}			Diepenbeek	Lutselusstraat 157	50.91864°N 5.46631°E	21562 Info	
Sapitelmeulen watermill ^{(nl)} ^{(fr)}	Yes		Diepenbeek	Molenstraat 24	50.90810°N 5.43215°E	21566 Info	
elongated farm ^{(nl)} ^{(fr)}			Diepenbeek	Nanofstraat 122	50.90341°N 5.40734°E	21568 Info	
Our Lady Chapel ^{(nl)}			Diepenbeek	Stationsstraat	50.91555°N 5.42535°E	21569 Info	
elongated farm, now pub ^{(nl)} ^{(fr)}			Diepenbeek	Stationsstraat	50.91744°N 5.42723°E	21570 Info	
Farm ^{(nl)} ^{(fr)}	Yes		Diepenbeek	Stationsstraat 50	50.91738°N 5.43033°E	21571 Info	
Farm ^{(nl)} ^{(fr)}			Diepenbeek	Stationsstraat 55		21572 Info	
Our Lady Chapel ^{(nl)}			Diepenbeek	Onze-Lieve-Vrouwstraat	50.91774°N 5.44746°E	21573 Info	
Closed farm ^{(nl)} ^{(fr)}			Diepenbeek	Onze-Lieve-Vrouwstraat 14		21575 Info	
elongated farm ^{(nl)} ^{(fr)}			Diepenbeek	Pachthoevestraat 51	50.91432°N 5.46438°E	21579 Info	
Farm ^{(nl)} ^{(fr)}			Diepenbeek	Pampertstraat 33		21580 Info	
Plomp Standaert Meulen, watermill ^{(nl)} ^{(fr)}			Diepenbeek	Plompaertstraat 29	50.92889°N 5.40799°E	21584 Info	
Closed farm ^{(nl)} ^{(fr)}			Diepenbeek	Rooistraat 18	50.92036°N 5.39018°E	21587 Info	
Farm standalone components ^{(nl)} ^{(fr)}			Diepenbeek	Russelbeekstraat 2	50.91369°N 5.40660°E	21588 Info	
Castle Diepenbeek ^{(nl)} ^{(fr)}	Yes		Diepenbeek	Stationsstraat 25	50.91279°N 5.41980°E	21591 Info	
Provincial school ^{(nl)} ^{(fr)}			Diepenbeek	Stationsstraat 7	50.90982°N 5.41905°E	21592 Info	
Double House ^{(nl)} ^{(fr)}			Diepenbeek	Stationsstraat 13	50.91009°N 5.41980°E	21593 Info	
Mill ^{(nl)} ^{(fr)}			Diepenbeek	Stationsstraat 16	50.91008°N 5.42077°E	21594 Info	
Farm "Klein Terherken" ^{(nl)} ^{(fr)}			Diepenbeek	Ter Herkenstraat 2	50.87739°N 5.41029°E	21595 Info	
Farm "Klein Terherken" ^{(nl)} ^{(fr)}			Diepenbeek	Ter Herkenstraat 2A	50.87739°N 5.41029°E	21595 Info	
Farm ^{(nl)} ^{(fr)}	Yes		Diepenbeek	Tomstraat 3	50.89784°N 5.36978°E	21596 Info	
Double House ^{(nl)} ^{(fr)}			Diepenbeek	Varkensmarkt 4	50.90870°N 5.41915°E	21597 Info	
Mansion house type double ^{(nl)} ^{(fr)}			Diepenbeek	Varkensmarkt 7	50.90806°N 5.41891°E	21598 Info	
Farm Merlemont, "Court of Blackbird" ^{(nl)} ^{(fr)}	Yes		Diepenbeek	Merlemontstraat 1		21599 Info	
Farm ^{(nl)} ^{(fr)}			Diepenbeek	Visserijstraat 29	50.91918°N 5.45304°E	21600 Info	
Farm ^{(nl)} ^{(fr)}			Diepenbeek	Volksstraat 31	50.91637°N 5.45742°E	21602 Info	
Parish of Saint Servatius ^{(nl)} ^{(fr)}	Yes		Diepenbeek	Marktplein	50.90823°N 5.41971°E	83670 Info	More images
section house ^{(nl)} ^{(fr)}			Diepenbeek	Dorpsstraat 14	50.90846°N 5.42010°E	83671 Info	
Farmhouse ^{(nl)} ^{(fr)}			Diepenbeek	Zavelstraat 115	50.89919°N 5.39893°E	83672 Info	
St. Roch Chapel ^{(nl)} ^{(fr)}	Yes		Diepenbeek	Sint-Rochusstraat	50.90254°N 5.41097°E	200389 Info	
Cloister of St. Ursula ^{(nl)} ^{(fr)}	Yes		Diepenbeek	Wijkstraat 16/1	50.90720°N 5.42416°E	200657 Info	
Lattice Barn ^{(nl)} ^{(fr)}	Yes		Diepenbeek	Netelbroekstraat 1		200667 Info	
Three bunkers on the lock of the Albert ^{(nl)} ^{(fr)}			Diepenbeek	Havenlaan		214009 Info	
Three bunkers on the lock of the Albert ^{(nl)} ^{(fr)}			Diepenbeek	Havenlaan		214009 Info	
Three bunkers on the lock of the Albert ^{(nl)} ^{(fr)}			Diepenbeek	Roerdompstraat		214009 Info	
Closed farm ^{(nl)} ^{(fr)}			Diepenbeek	Onze-Lieve-Vrouwstraat 10		214013 Info	
Cottage villa ^{(nl)} ^{(fr)}			Diepenbeek	Visserijstraat 10		214014 Info	

== See also ==
- List of onroerend erfgoed in Limburg (Belgium)
- Diepenbeek
