= Corda Campus =

Tech and innovation campus in Hasselt

The Corda Campus is one of the largest technology and innovation campuses in the Meuse-Rhine Euregion, located in Hasselt, Belgium. The campus currently houses 250 companies on a 14-hectare site and employs about 5,000 people.

== History ==
The campus has its origins in the former Philips site in Hasselt. In 2005, the “Research Campus Hasselt II” project was initiated to replace the aging Philips buildings and attract young engineers. In 2009, the Limburg Reconversion Company (LRM) took full control of the project and renamed it the Corda Campus.

== Facilities and infrastructure ==
The campus consists of nine corporate blocks, including:

- Corda 1, 2 and 3: Recognizable buildings with a sloping green roof
- Corda 4, 5 and 6: Former Philips buildings that were renovated and expanded
- Hall A and Hall B

The campus has more than 3,300 parking spaces, including charging stations for electric vehicles and shared cars. In addition, the campus is located along the Kiewit train station.

In January 2015, snow allowed the roofs of the Corda Campus to be temporarily used as ski and snowboard slopes. In addition, part of the roof of the Corda Campus has been used as a vineyard since 2023, in collaboration with Hasselt University.

== Economical impact ==
The campus has developed into an economic flagship of the Limburgish economy, with employment comparable to the glory years of Philips in Hasselt.

Because of its impact on Central Limburg, LRM, the Provincial Development Company (POM) Limburg, Profel and the municipality of Pelt are working on a spin-off of the Corda Campus called Campus Noord. The €1.9 million investment would eventually create 3,000 new jobs and be delivered in 2027.

== Future development ==
A Master Plan 2.0 was developed, with the first concrete realization being the Corda Arena. This state-of-the-art 10,000sqm multifunctional digital complex will accommodate business events and conferences for up to 4,000 people. It is scheduled to open in 2025.

On top of that, the Corda Campus will be expanded by 9 additional hectares, together with an investment of €310 million, adding new office clusters, data centers, box-in-box clean rooms, B2B showrooms, business flats and corporate brand offices. Kiewit station will also receive an upgrade in the process. The establishment of an international school has been considered, but currently shelved until more expats are attracted.
