= Louis Willems =

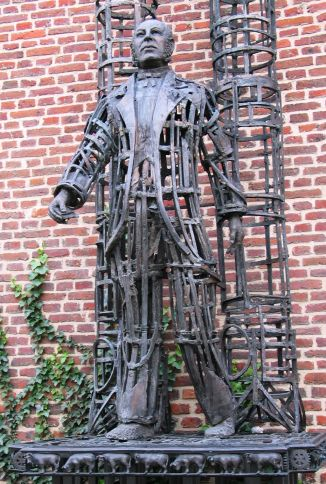
Doctor Louis Willems (26 sep 2004)

Louis Willems (25 April 1822 in Hasselt – 21 January 1907 in Hasselt) was a Belgian medical doctor, and one of the pioneers of bacteriology and immunology.

== Biography ==
He studied medicine in Leuven, receiving his doctorate in 1849 . He was the son of Pieter Jan Willems, a gin distiller and the mayor of Hasselt between 1836 and 1842. His statue stands next to the National Genever Museum in Hasselt.

Because of the gin industry the area around Hasselt had a large amount of livestock, as the waste products, fermented grains, were used to fatten cattle. An outbreak occurred around 1828 in Belgium of a lung plague, described as being like the farmer's disease. In 1833 the disease reached the Netherlands, particularly in the so-called "flushing district" in and around Schiedam. It reached Hasselt in 1838. It was contagious bovine pleuropneumonia, a disease that still occurred in outbreaks at the end of the twentieth century, such as France in 1980. In Australia a national eradication program led to disease-free status by 1973. In Asia, Africa, the Iberian Peninsula and Eastern Europe in the late twentieth century, the disease was still present. It not until 1898 that the described causality was accepted.

This disease, which ravaged livestock, hit the income of the Willems' family itself. Interested by a competition from the Academie Royale de Medecine de Belgique, the graduate physician focused on these issues, and he began re-training at the École nationale vétérinaire d'Alfort near Paris, gaining further knowledge in the Netherlands and Germany. Soon he discovered in the lungs of diseased animals, microscopic organisms (genus Mycoplasma), which he labelled as agents of the disease (now known as Mycoplasma mycoides subspecies mycoides biotype small colony).

Analogous with the treatment of smallpox, he injected an extract of the affected bovine lungs (pus) into the posterior end of laboratory animals, which produced a local infection that prevented the lung disease. The first method, namely injections in the abdomen of the cattle, all too often led to infection and death of the "treated" animals. He systematically investigated relocation of the vaccination site and also found that new injections had little additional negative effect. Dogs, sheep, chickens, rabbits and turkeys did not show disease from the antigen, and he came to the conclusion that it was not insanitary conditions, but an internal agent peculiar to cattle that caused the epidemic.

When he found that the organisms from the lungs of the diseased animals do not develop in animals, he decided that "an unspecified substance from the extract caused lung immunity." Thus he described for the first time the immunity principle.

In 1852 he wrote down his experiences and findings in a penciled letter to the then Minister of Interior, Charles Rogier. Following this letter a committee was established to investigate his findings. There was a worldwide controversy, with supporters and opponents in France, Germany, South Africa, Australia, the United States and Russia. At the time, there was still no consensus in medical circles about the causes of what, after the work of Robert Koch and Louis Pasteur, was generally described as infectious diseases: plague, tuberculosis, etc. Only in 1864 was the merit of his work recognized, and his ideas spread throughout Europe, Southern Africa and Australia, even though it was still a long time before the disease mechanism had been clearly defined.

In a letter dated June 29, 1880 to Willems (Archives Beveren-Waas) Pasteur wrote:

I saw the very interesting corpuscles that you previously reported it, and have some tests done to them to cultivate, so far without result. reportedly are you there succeeded. I look forward to your publications in this regard. I thank Mr. Bouley me by you in touch, and by whom I very much appreciated've applied for your wonderful discovery of preventive inoculation against infectious Pleuropneumonia.

It was not until around 1900 before the vaccinations were widely accepted in scientific circles. Meanwhile, the vaccination methods were refined, and instead of requiring the extracts of diseased lungs, real vaccines were soon developed.

== Status ==
Dr. Willems is considered one of the founders of bacteriology and immunology. In Diepenbeek the Dr. L. Willems Institute was established for both animal and human reproductive research. One of the many merits of this institute is the pioneering work it has done in the field of research on multiple sclerosis.

The museum statue. It is the letter from William to the Minister, but also the crown of the Virga Jesse in Hasselt people who donated to the Virgin in gratitude for ridding the city of the bovine disease. In September 2002, a statue of Louis Willems of Hasselt by artist Luc Steegen was aptly placed behind the Provincial Library. This is where the paddock for the ancestral home of Doctor Willems would have been and where his animals grazed.

In 2005 he was also a contender for the title The Greatest Belgian, but took the final nomination list, and stranded at No 224 of those who fell just outside the nomination list.
