= Sint-Lambrechts-Herk =

Sub-municipality of the city of Hasselt, Belgium

- Sub-municipality of Hasselt
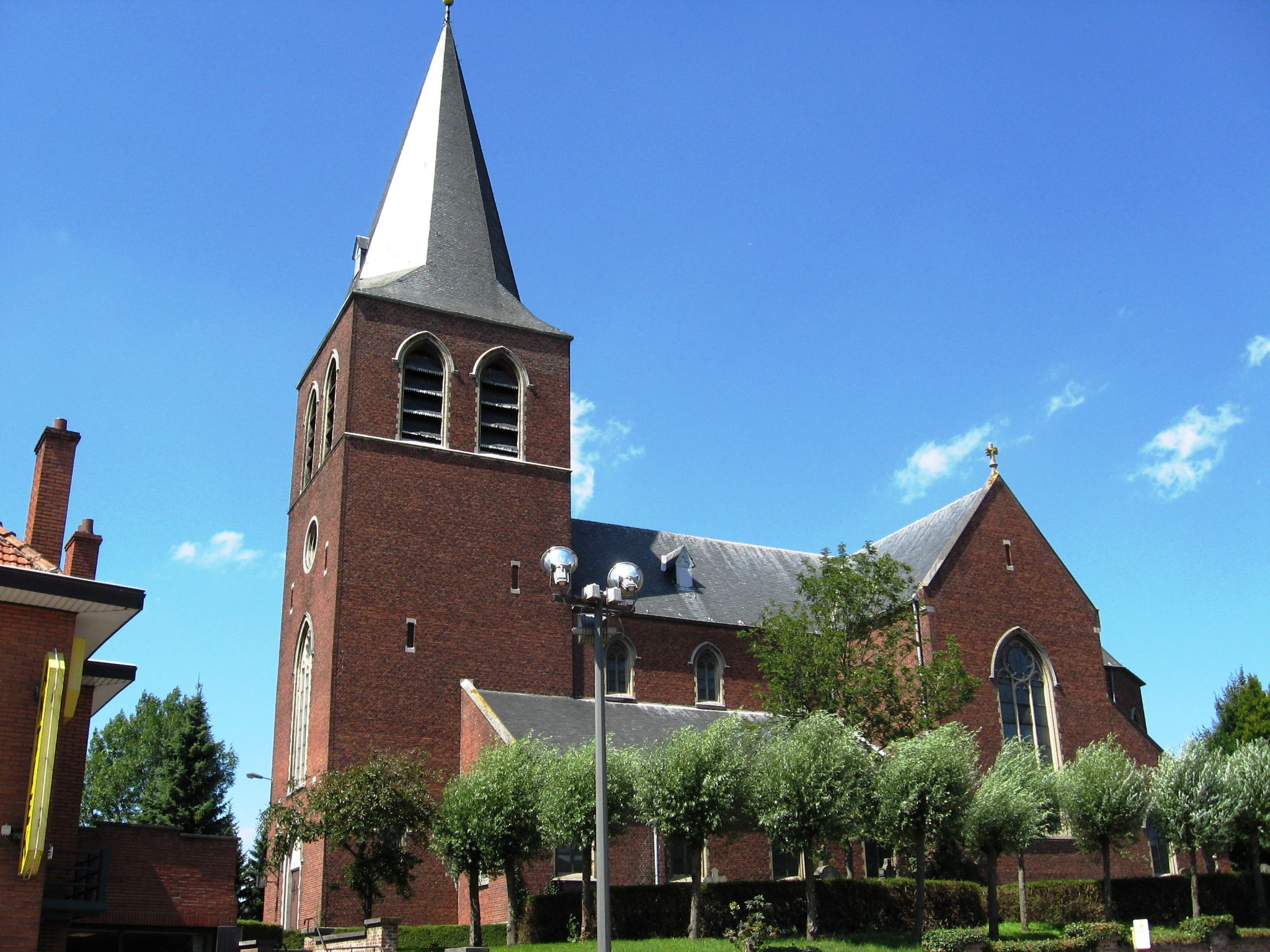
- St. Lambert's Church
- Interactive map of Sint-Lambrechts-Herk
- Location within Belgium Location within Limburg (Belgium)
- Coordinates: 50°54′00″N 5°18′00″E
- Country: Belgium
- Community: Flemish Community
- Region: Flemish Region
- Province: Limburg
- Arrondissement: Hasselt
- Municipality: Hasselt

Area
  - Total: 11.23 km^{2} (4.34 sq mi)

Population (2020-01-01)
  - Total: 4,700
  - Density: 420/km^{2} (1,100/sq mi)
- Postal codes: 3500
- Area codes: 011
- Website: st-lambrechts-herk.be

Sint-Lambrechts-Herk (Dutch: [sɪnt ˈlɑmbrɛxts ˈɦɛr(ə)k]; French: Herck-Saint-Lambert [ɛʁk sɛ̃ lɑ̃bɛʁ]) is a sub-municipality of the city of Hasselt located in the province of Limburg, Flemish Region, Belgium. It was a separate municipality until 1977. On 1 January 1977, it was merged into Hasselt.
