= Hasselt =

Capital of Limburg province, Belgium

- City and municipality
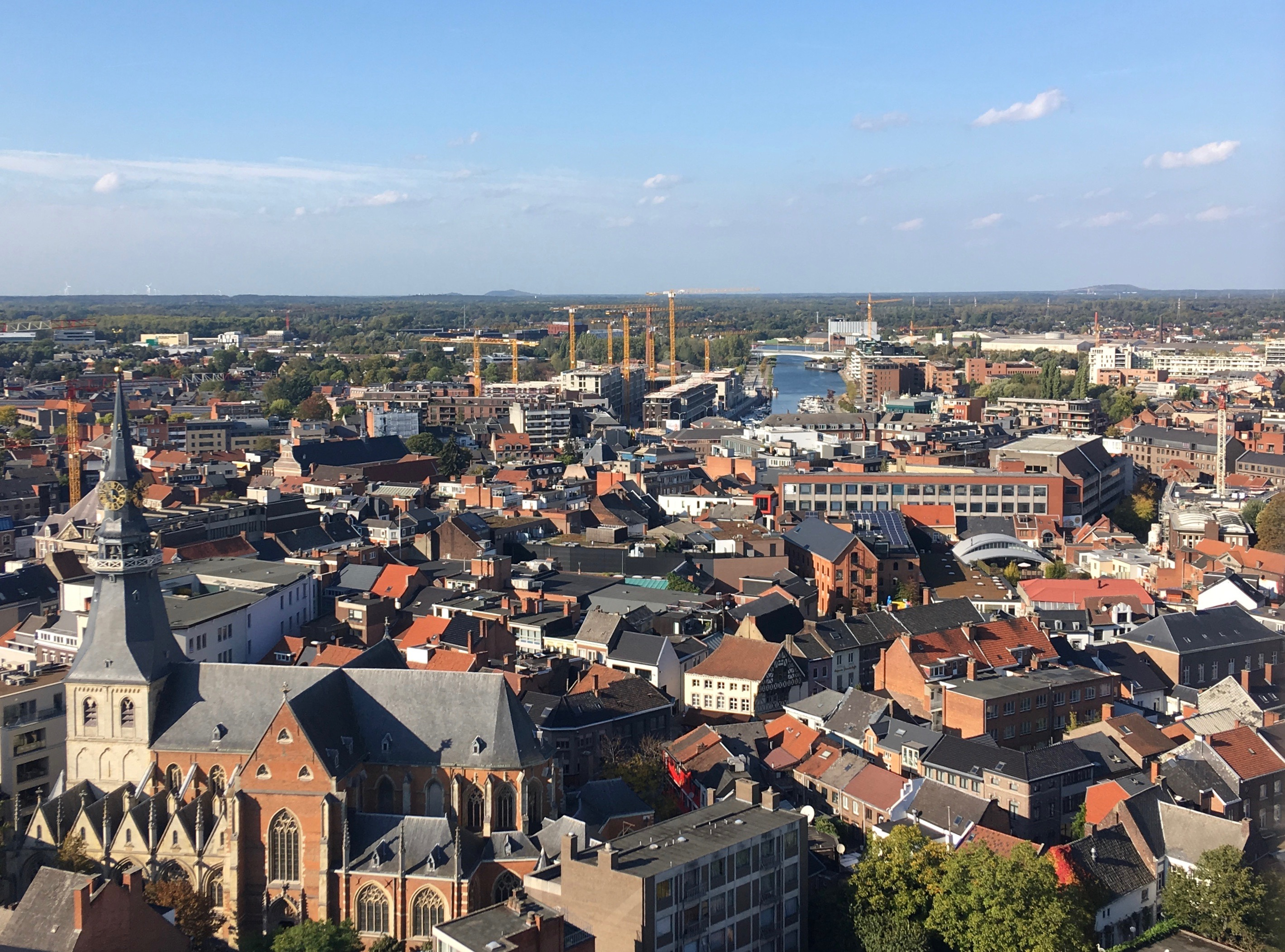
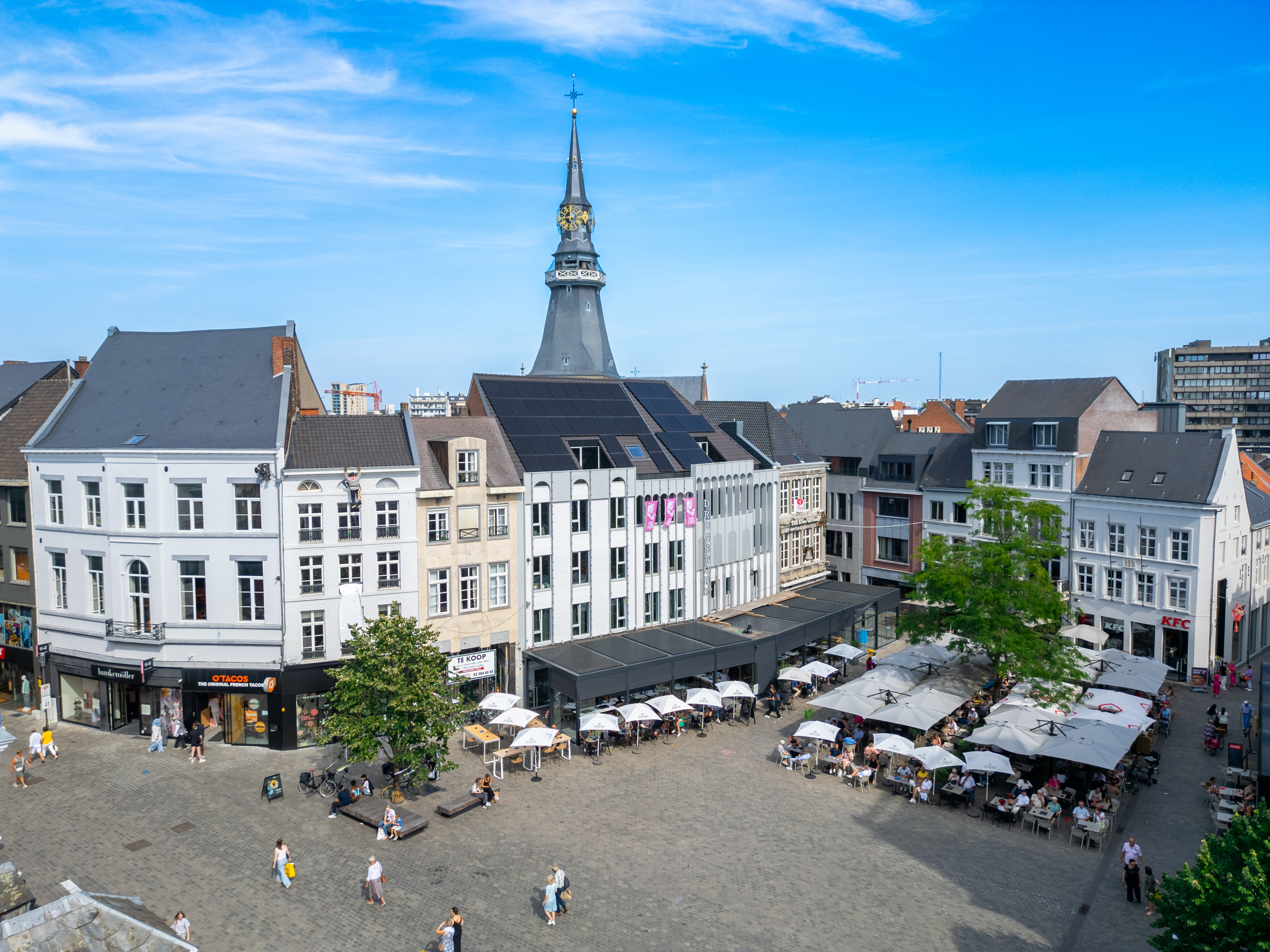
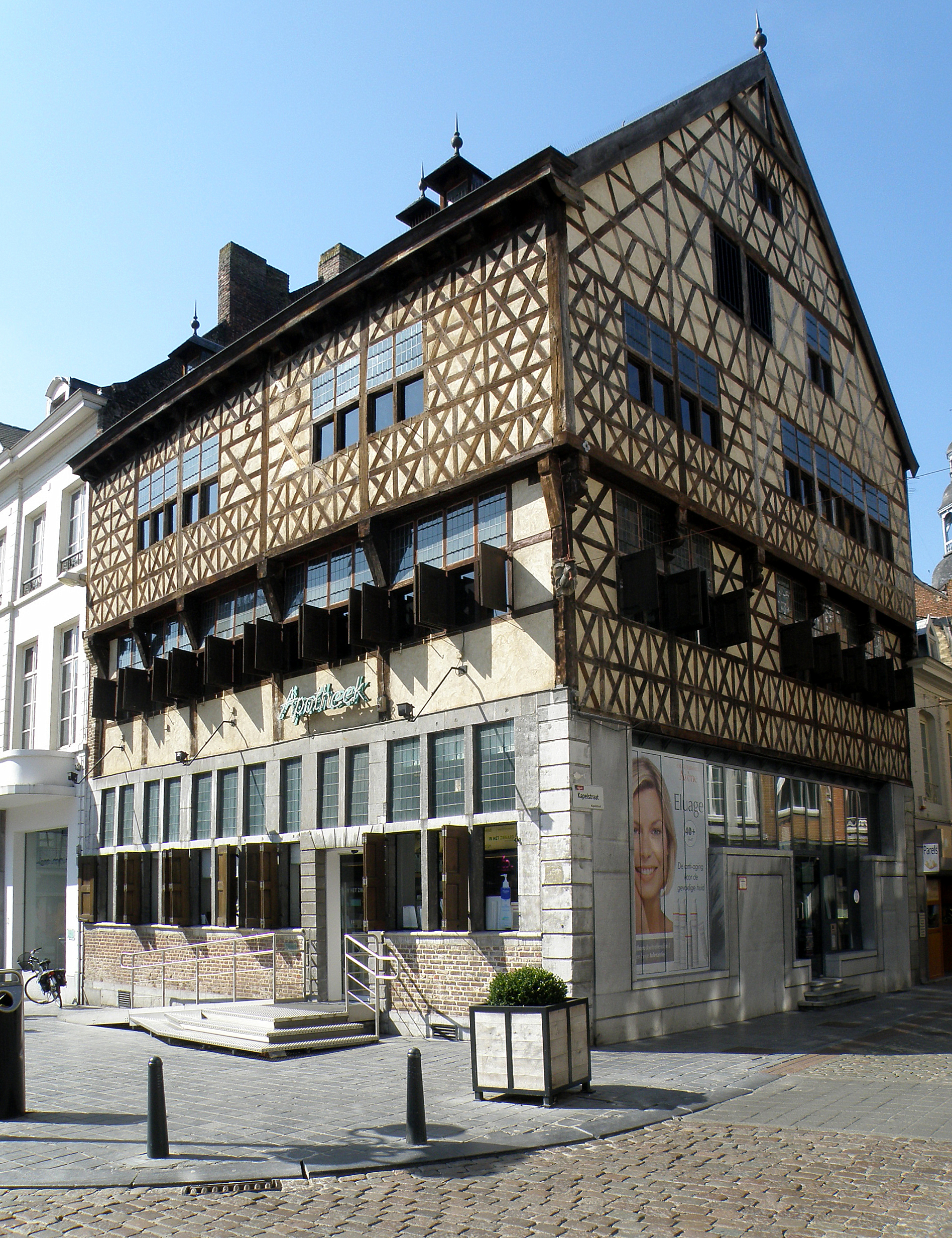
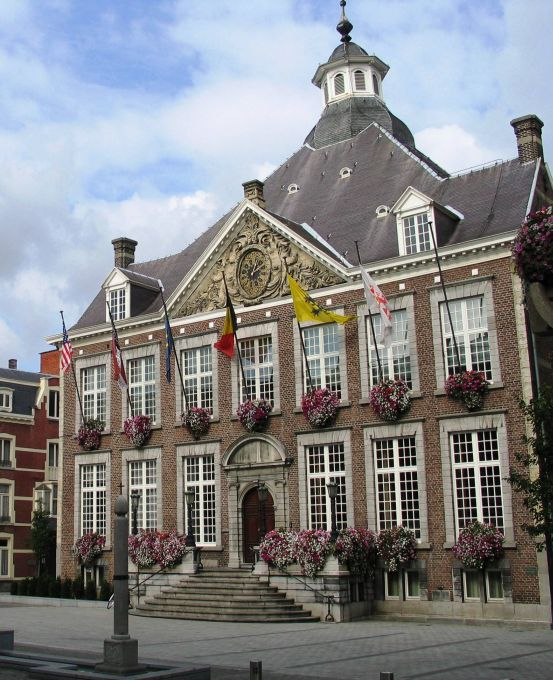
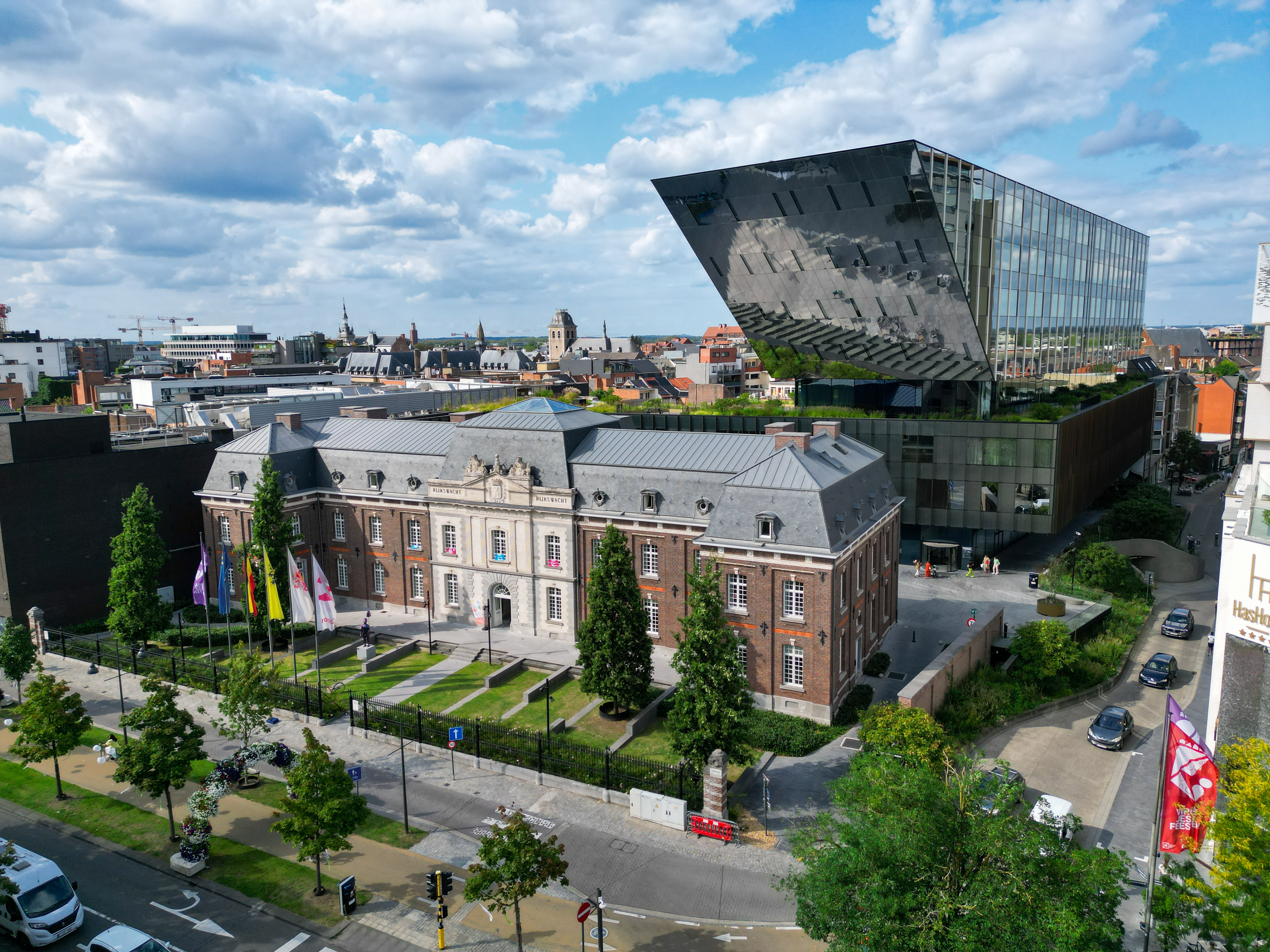
- City center with St. Quentin's Cathedral in the bottom left Grote Markt timber-framed house Het Sweert Old City Hall New City Hall

- Flag Coat of arms

- Location of Hasselt in Limburg
- Interactive map of Hasselt
- Location in Belgium
- Coordinates: 50°55′48″N 05°20′15″E
- Country: Belgium
- Community: Flemish Community
- Region: Flemish Region
- Province: Limburg
- Arrondissement: Hasselt

Government
  - Mayor: Steven Vandeput (N-VA)
  - Governing parties: Open VLD/N-VA, CD&V, Vooruit

Area
  - Total: 136.67 km^{2} (52.77 sq mi)

Population (2025-01-01)
  - Total: 90,249
  - Density: 660.34/km^{2} (1,710.3/sq mi)
- Postal codes: 3500, 3501, 3510, 3511, 3512, 3720, 3721, 3722, 3723, 3724
- NIS code: 71072
- Area codes: 011, 012
- Website: www.hasselt.be
- Logo of Hasselt

Hasselt (Dutch pronunciation: [ˈɦɑsəlt], Limburgish pronunciation: [ˈɦɑsəlt], French pronunciation: [ʔasɛlt]) is the capital and largest city of the province of Limburg in the Flemish Region of Belgium.

As of 1 January 2025, Hasselt had a total population of 90,249. The old town of Hasselt is surrounded by a number of satellite hamlets including Kiewit, Runkst, Banneuxwijk, Godsheide and Rapertingen. Further away are several sub-municipalities which were once within other municipalities, including Guigoven, Kermt, Kortessem, Kuringen, Sint-Lambrechts-Herk, Spalbeek, Stevoort, Stokrooie, Wimmertingen, Vliermaal, Vliermaalroot, and Wintershoven.

Geographically, Hasselt is located between the Campine region, north of the Demer river, and the Hesbaye region, to the south. Both the Demer river and the Albert Canal run through the municipality.

In terms of economic regions, Hasselt is within the transnational Meuse-Rhine Euroregion, connecting neighbouring regions in Wallonia, the Netherlands and Germany.

== History ==
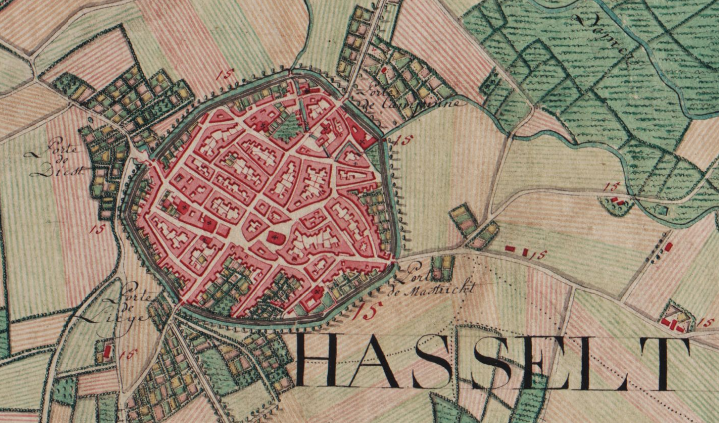
Hasselt on the Ferraris map (around 1775)

Hasselt was founded in approximately the 7th century on the Helbeek, a tributary of the Demer river. During the Middle Ages it became one of the free cities of the county of Loon (which had borders approximately the same as the current province of Limburg). It was first named in a document in 1165. In 1232 Arnold IV, Count of Loon gave the city the same freedoms as those enjoyed in Liège. Hasselt became the biggest city in present-day Limburg thanks to its favourable setting, and the proximity of the count's castle at Herkenrode in Kuringen. In 1366 the county of Loon came under the direct rule of the Prince-Bishopric of Liège and remained so until the annexation by France in 1794.

During the First French Empire, the city of Maastricht became the capital of the French Department of the Lower Meuse. This comprised not only the area of the modern province of Limburg in Belgium, but also what is now the province of Limburg in the Netherlands. After the defeat of Napoleon in 1815, all of what is now Belgium became part of the United Kingdom of the Netherlands. During this time, it was King William I who renamed the Lower Meuse department after the medieval Duchy of Limburg. This Duchy was in fact named after Limbourg on the Vesdre river, now in the Liège province of Belgium, which had never encompassed Hasselt or Maastricht. Belgium split from the Netherlands in 1830, but the status of Limburg was only resolved nine years later in 1839, with the division of Limburg into Belgian and Dutch parts. Hasselt became the provisional capital of the Belgian province of Limburg. In ecclesiastical terms, Belgian Limburg became an independent entity from the Diocese of Liège only in 1967, and Hasselt became the seat of the new Diocese of Hasselt.

In 1977, Hasselt merged with several surrounding municipalities attaching the current sub-municipalities of Kermt, Kuringen, Sint-Lambrechts-Herk, Stevoort and Wimmertingen.

Since the beginning of the 21st century, many urban renewal projects have taken place in the city, including the construction of the Two Towers (TT) neighborhood. On 1 January 2025, the neighboring village of Kortessem merged into Hasselt, introducing several new sub-municipalities.

== Etymology ==
The name Hasselt is derived from the Germanic word Hasaluth which refers to the common hazel.

== Town centre ==
The centre is mostly car-free and contains a number of historical buildings. Among the oldest buildings in the town centre are the St. Quentin's Cathedral (11th to 18th centuries) and the Refuge of Herkenrode Abbey, the city's oldest civic building (1542). The Grote Markt (Grand Market) and the nearby streets are lined with restaurants brasseries, cafes and taverns.

The Demerstraat and the Koning Albertstraat are the most important shopping streets, while the Kapelstraat and Hoogstraat house upscale shops and brands. Another major religious building besides the cathedral is the Virga Jesse Basilica. The churches must cede domination of the skyline of the city to the modern twin towers of the TT-wijk (TT Quarter), however. In 2003, the renovation of this complex, now including a shopping mall and a hotel, gave the centre a new boost. In 2004, Hasselt was the first city to receive the title "most sociable city in Flanders".

== Demographics ==
In 1977, the merger of Hasselt with several surrounding municipalities added 22.309 inhabitants at the time to its own population of 40.446 inhabitants. As of 1 October 2024, Hasselt had a total population of 81.708 (40.070 men and 41.638 women).

=== Languages ===
- Dutch in Hasselt is often spoken with a distinctive Limburgish accent and vocabulary, which should not be confused with the Limburgish language.
- Limburgish (or Limburgian) is the overlapping term for the tonal dialects spoken in the Belgian and Dutch provinces of Limburg. The Hasselt dialect is only one of many variants of Limburgish. Limburgish is a language, and not the same as the regional variation of Dutch spoken in Dutch Limburg and Belgian Limburg.
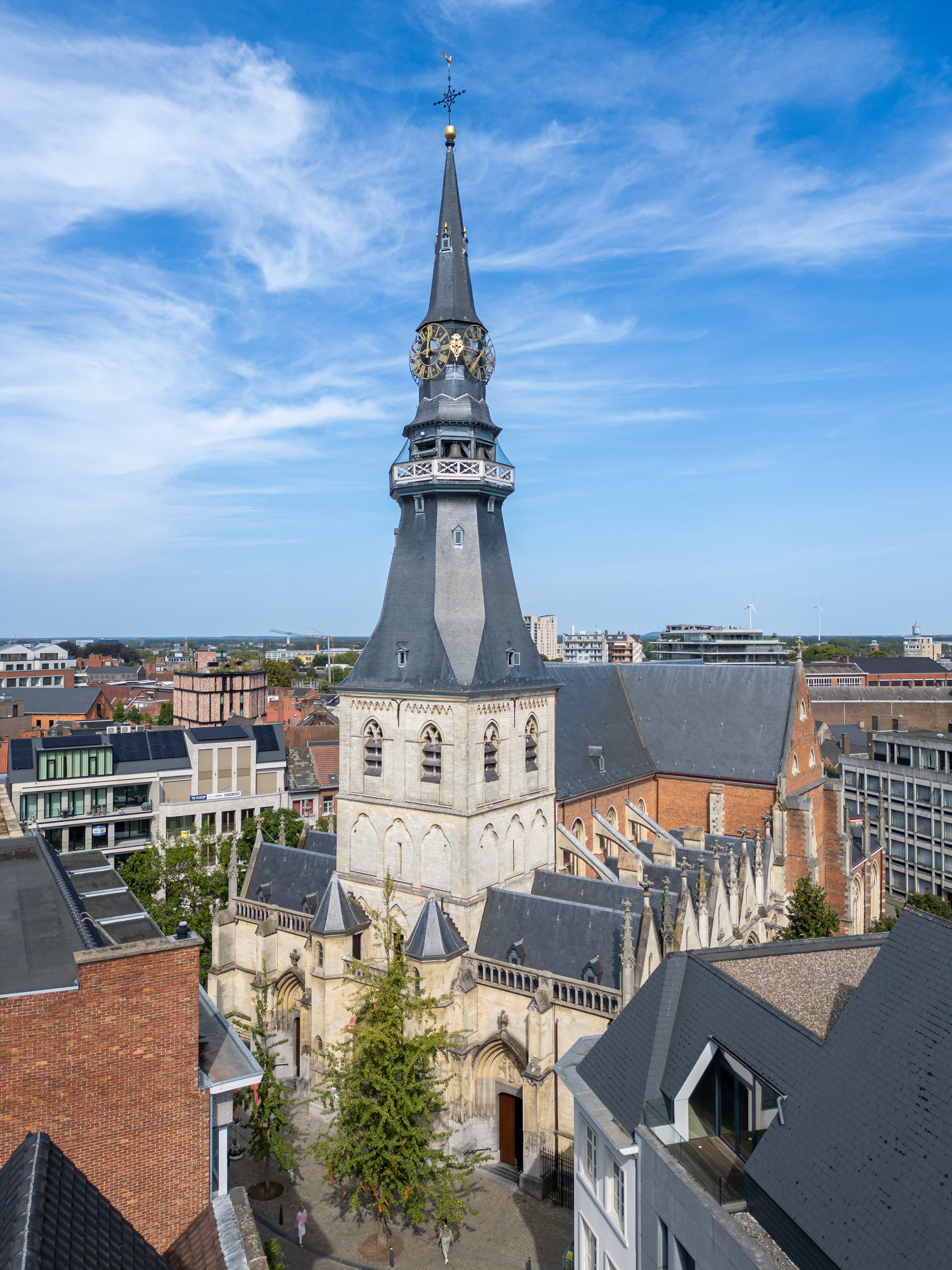
  St. Quentin's Cathedral
  Since Limburgish is still the mother tongue of many inhabitants, Limburgish grammar, vocabulary and pronunciation can however have a significant impact on the way locals speak Dutch in public life.
- French was historically spoken by some of the city population within living memory.

=== Religion ===
Hasselt is the main seat of the Catholic diocese of Hasselt, which covers the entire Belgian province of Limburg. The main church is St. Quentin's Cathedral. Hasselt also consists of about 30 parishes. Next to the Catholic Church, Hasselt houses both a Moroccan and Turkish mosque as both communities are established in the city and the surrounding municipalities. There was a Jewish community in Hasselt for centuries, but most of their Jews were deported and murdered during the war. The synagogue was destroyed together with its contents, including ceremonial objects and Torah scrolls. The cemetery is now maintained by the local authorities. A Hebrew inscription on a local war monument memorializes the murdered Jews of Hasselt.

== Main sights ==
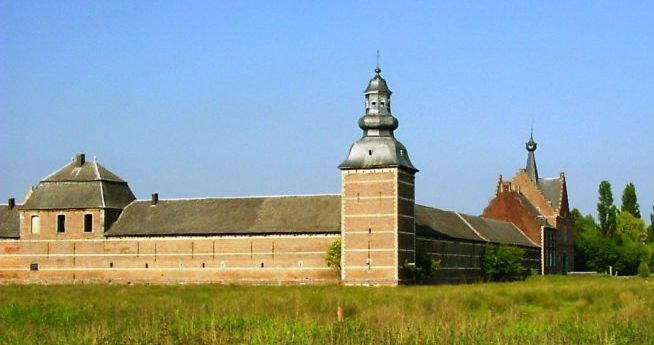
Herkenrode Abbey

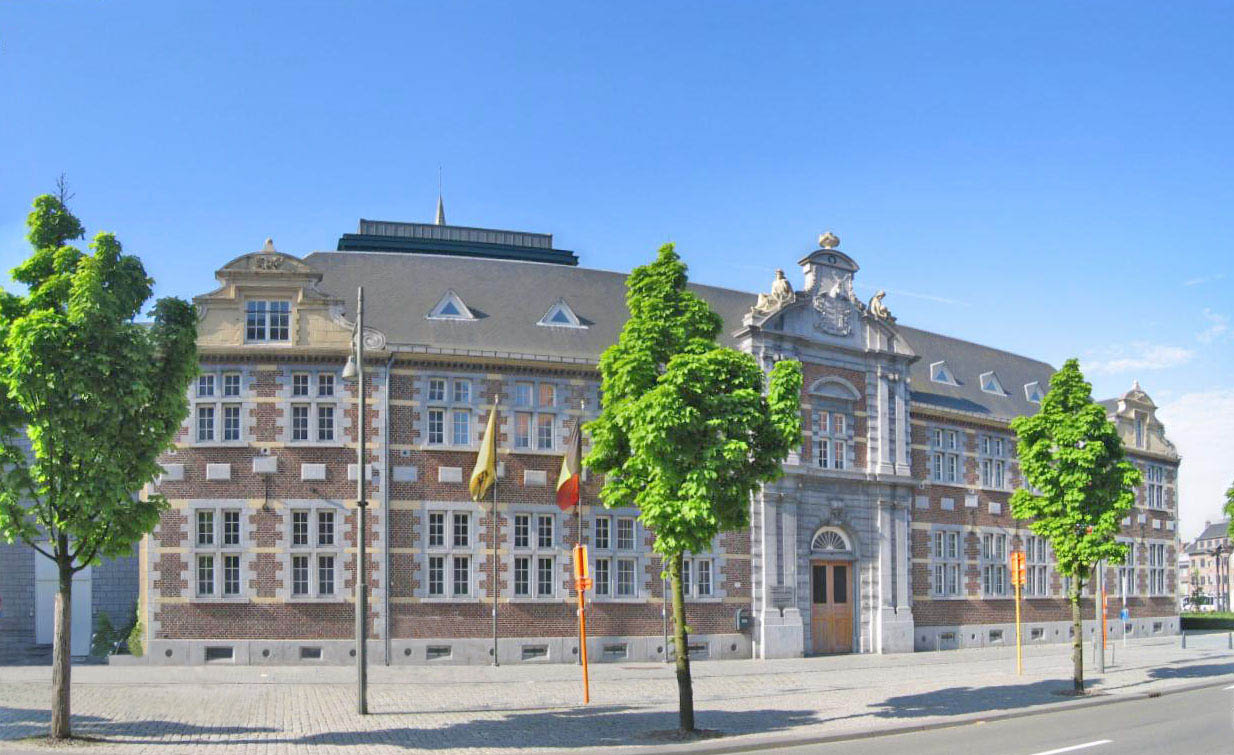
Grauwzustersklooster, including the Old Inn

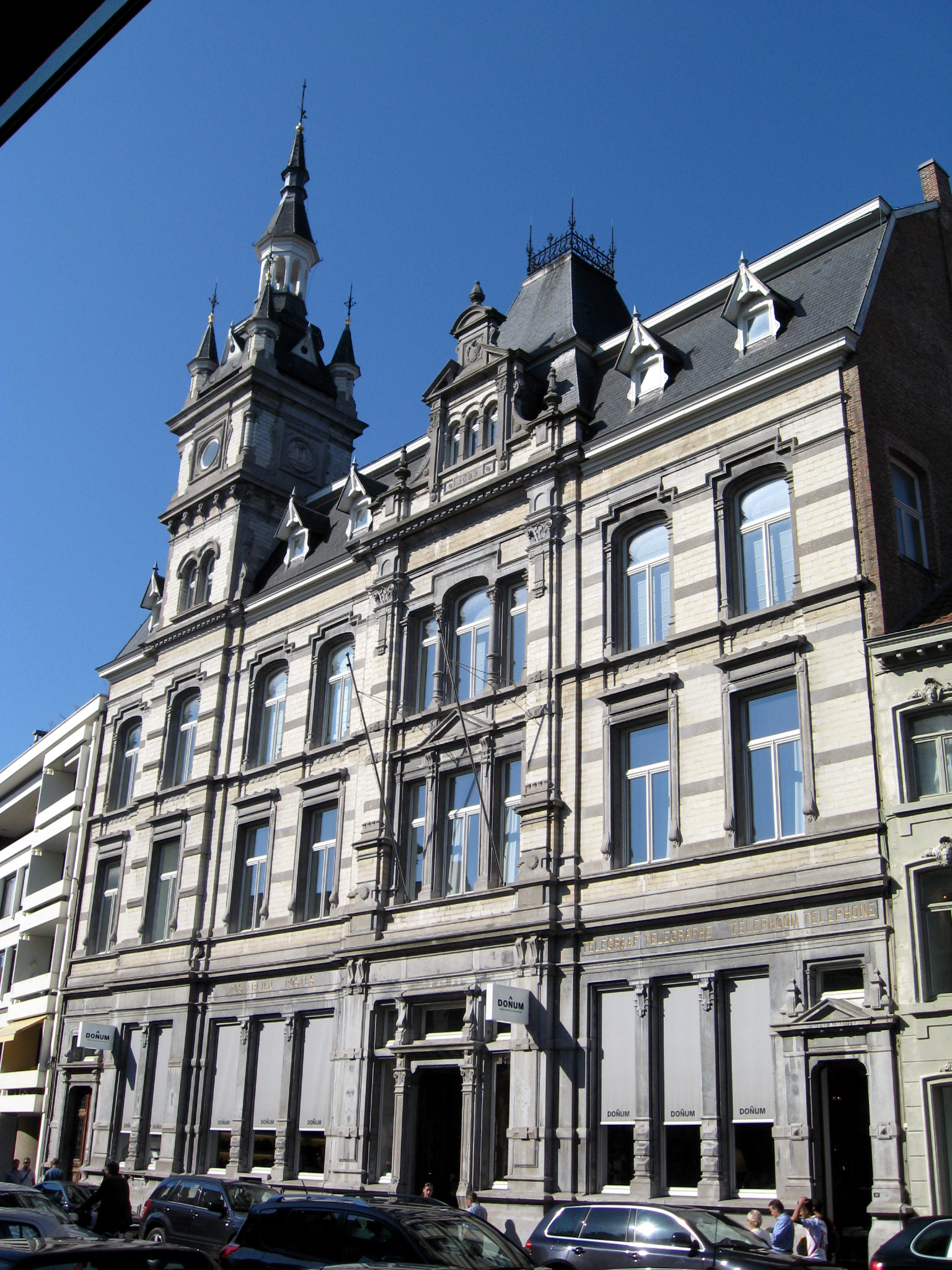
Old Post Office

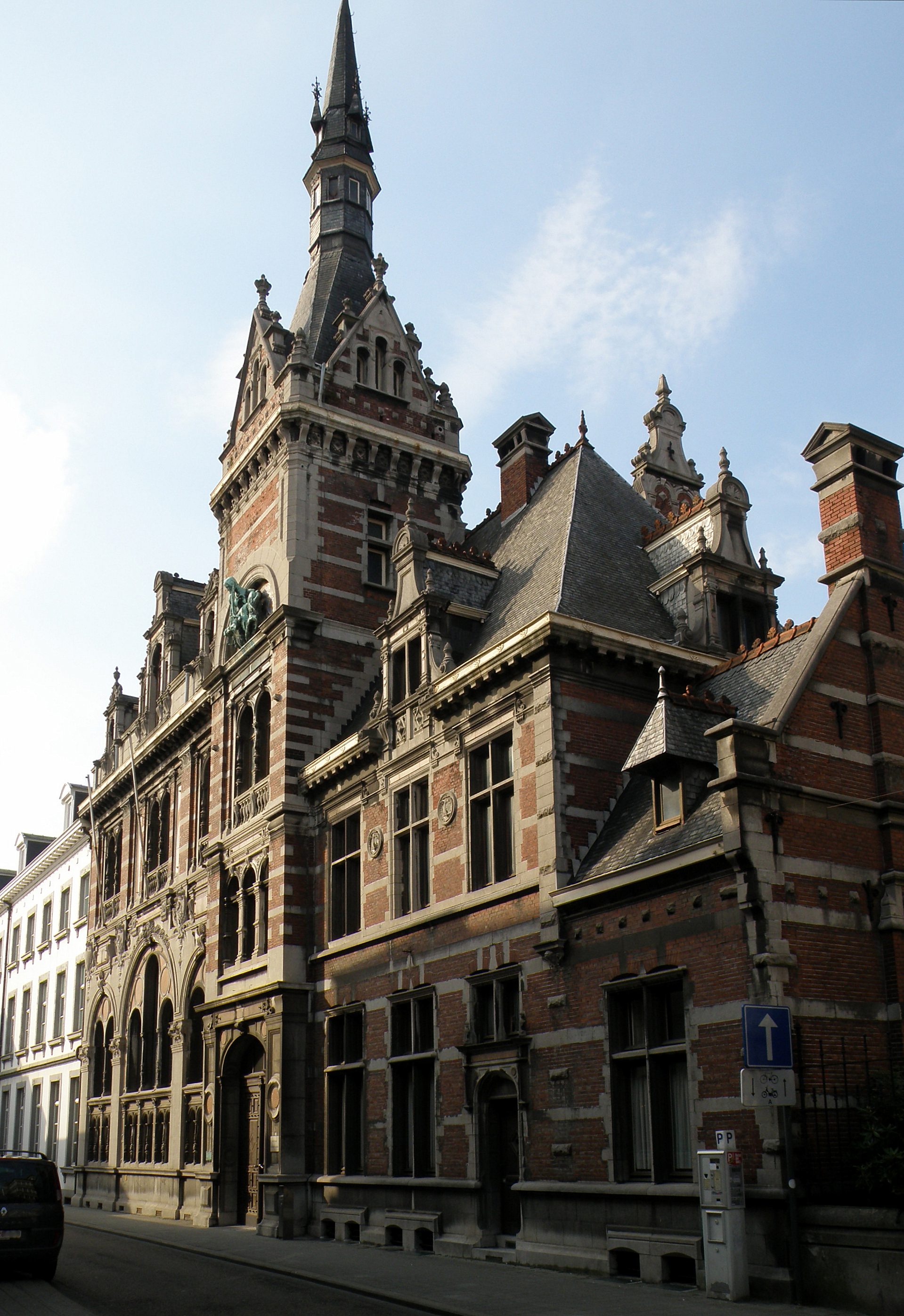
Old Provincial Government Building

Eclectic architecture in Hasselt
- Gothic St. Quentin's Cathedral, seat of the Roman Catholic Diocese of Hasselt
- Virga Jesse Basilica, late-baroque and early-neoclassical architecture
- Herkenrode Abbey, Cistercian monastery
- Beguinage of Hasselt
- Grote Markt, including the timber-framed house Het Sweert
- Havermarkt, including the Old Post Office, the Old Courthouse, and the Augustinian Abbey
- Several buildings in the style of Mosan Renaissance architecture, among them the former Grauwzustersklooster (Abbey of the Grey Sisters of the Third Order)
- Several buildings in the style of eclectic architecture, among them the Old Post Office and the Old Provincial Government Building
- Neoclassical Old City Hall
- Refuge of Herkenrode Abbey, the city's oldest civic building
- Old Prison, now housing Hasselt University
- Oud Kerkhof, historic cemetery
- New City Hall, christened 't Scheep (The Ship)
- New Courthouse
- Art Museum Z33 in the Beguinage
- National Jenever Museum
- City Museum of Hasselt
- Fashion Museum in the former Grauwzustersklooster
- Cultuurcentrum Hasselt
- Japanese gardens, the largest in Europe
- Kiewit Nature Park
- Kiewit Airfield (recreational)

=== Events ===
- The Virga Jesse festival, featuring a Procession of the historic wooden statue of infant Jesus with Mary, is celebrated every seven years. It was last celebrated in August 2024.
- The yearly Jenever Festival celebrates the history of Jenever in Hasselt.
- Hasselt celebrates Carnival, but at a slightly different date than most places.
- The suburb Kiewit is the location of the yearly Pukkelpop (Pimple Pop) festival, one of Europe's largest alternative music festivals with over a hundred concerts. Rimpelrock (Wrinkle Rock), a festival with music for an older audience, is held at the same location one week prior.
- As in most Belgian cities, there is an annual Kermesse on a date associated with the local church's patron saint – in this case Saint Lambert -, which takes place in September.
- The Junior Eurovision Song Contest 2005 was held in Hasselt.
- The Grand Prix van Hasselt is a cyclo-cross race held in November which is part of the BPost Bank Trophy.
- Gaz de France Stars was a WTA Tour tennis tournament held in Hasselt from 2004 to 2006.
- The European Darts Championship was held in the city's Trixxo Arena three times from 2015 to 2017.

== Gastronomy ==
Hasselt brands itself as the "Capital of Taste", owing to its local distilleries of Jenever, the Hasselt Jenever Festival, Hasselt speculaas, and chocolate production.

=== Hasseltse Jenever (Hasselt gin) ===
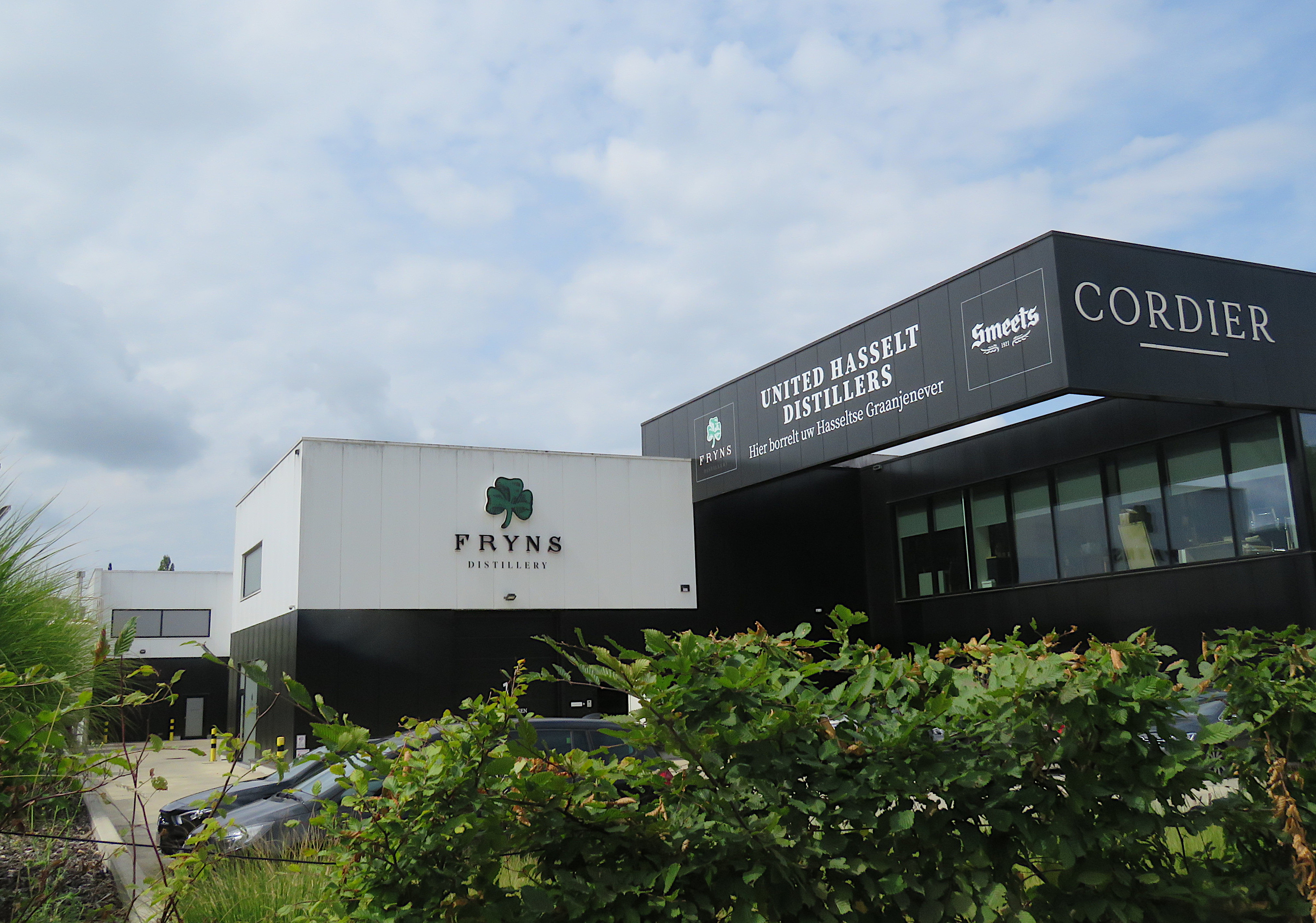
United Hasselt Distillers distills the famous brands Fryns and Smeets of Hasselt jenevers or gins

Hasselt is famous for its gin, locally known as Jenever. Even though the spirit is produced across the entire country of Belgium, Hasselt Jenever became famous when the city escaped the 1601 ban on the sale and production of the beverage imposed by Albert VII, Archduke of Austria and Isabella Clara Eugenia, both Archduke and Archduchess of the Habsburg Netherlands, because it belonged to the Prince-Bishopric of Liège. Dutch troops stationed in the city from 1675 to 1681 ensured that Hasselt Jenever, more than any other Belgian jenever, carried aromas of herbs and berries.

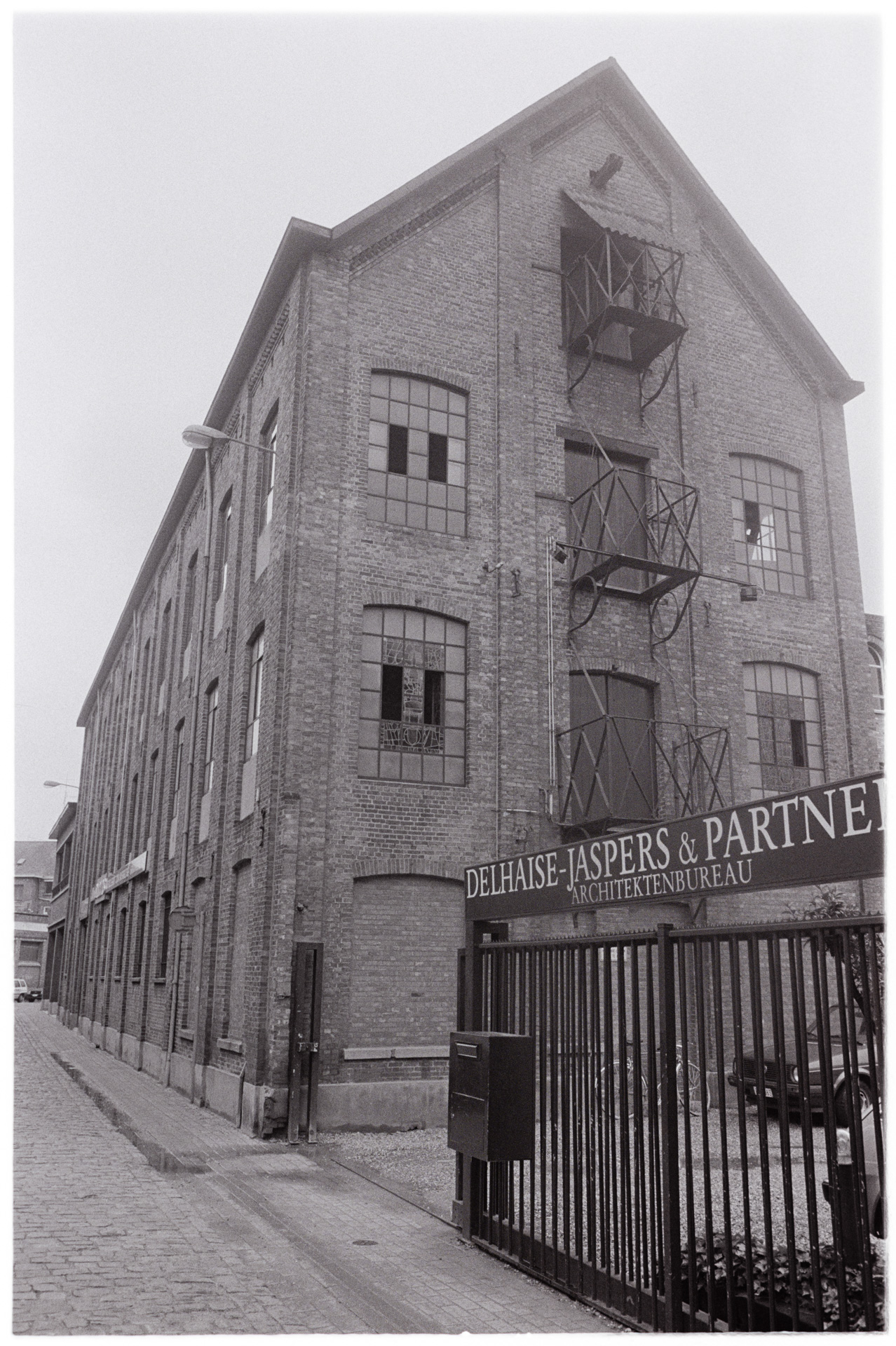
The former Smeets gin distillery built in 1947, still standing at Raamstraat 17.

At the end of the 19th century, dire living conditions among the working population and cheap Jenever prepared from sugar beet molasses led to the annual consumption of 9.5 litres of Jenever (50% vol) per inhabitant of Belgium. Jenever production was the most important industry in Limburg in the 19th century with most distilleries being located in Hasselt. However, increase in excise duty, competition from cheap industrial alcohol, the confiscation of copper stills by the Germans during World War I, and the Vandervelde law against alcohol abuse caused most distilleries in Hasselt to disappear or to be taken over by larger competitors.

By the early 21st century, Hasselt only housed two distilleries (known as 'stokerij' in Dutch): the National Jenever Museum and Stokerij Wissels, which was later bought by the larger Stokerij Fryns, based in Ghent, which resumed Jenever production on the former Wissels grounds under the Fryns name. Today, three Jenever distilleries operate in Hasselt: the National Jenever Museum, Stokerij Fryns, and Stokerij Vanderlinden, founded in 2017.

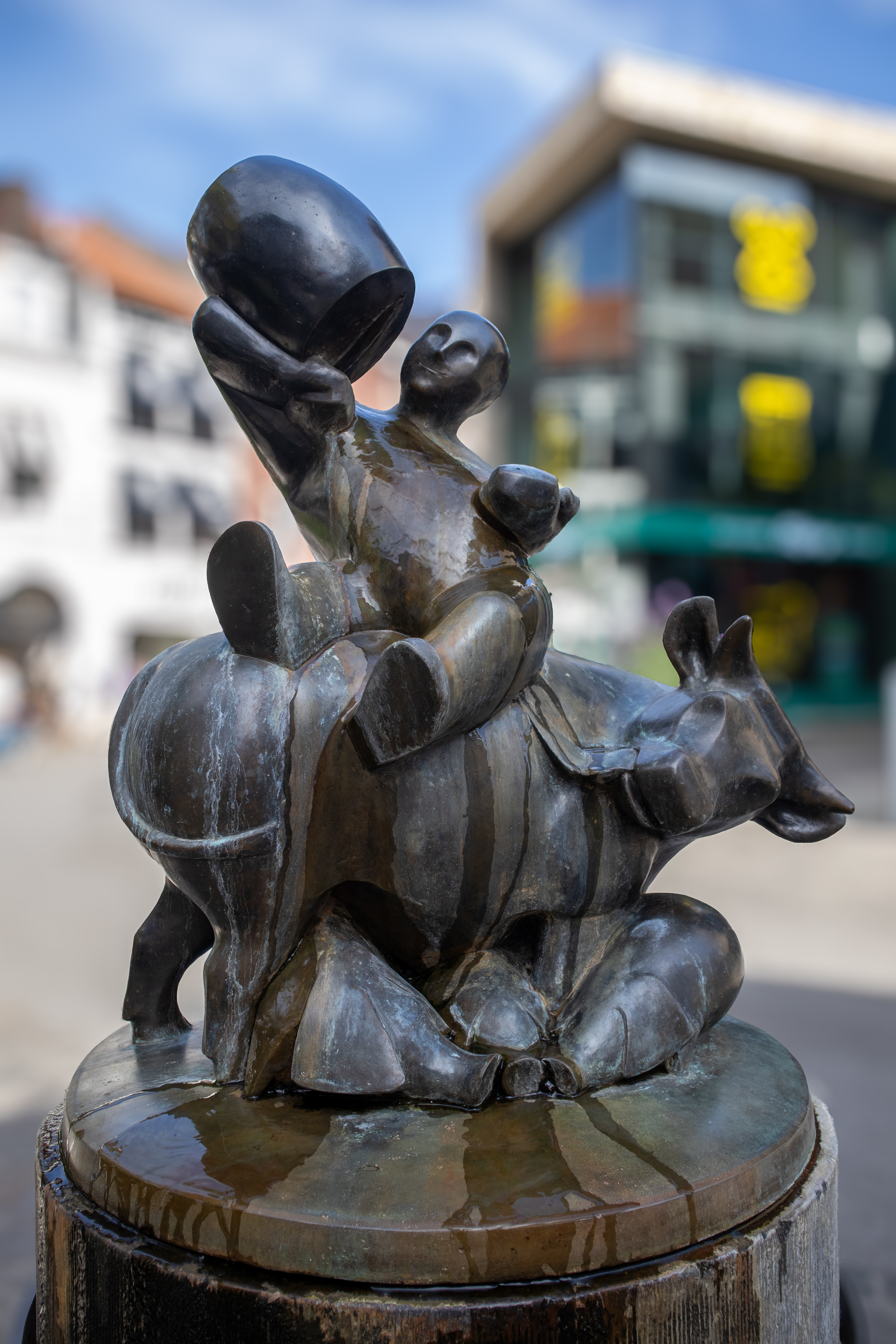
Het Borrelmanneke, symbolising the Hasselt gin culture and history

==== Hasselt Jenever Festival ====
Every year during the third weekend of October, the two-day Hasselt Jenever Festival takes place. It includes, among other elements, musical, dance, and street theatre performances, the Borrelmanneke fountain on Maastricherstraat being transformed from a water fountain into a Jenever fountain for the day and a Waiters' Race through the city center.

=== Hasselt speculaas ===
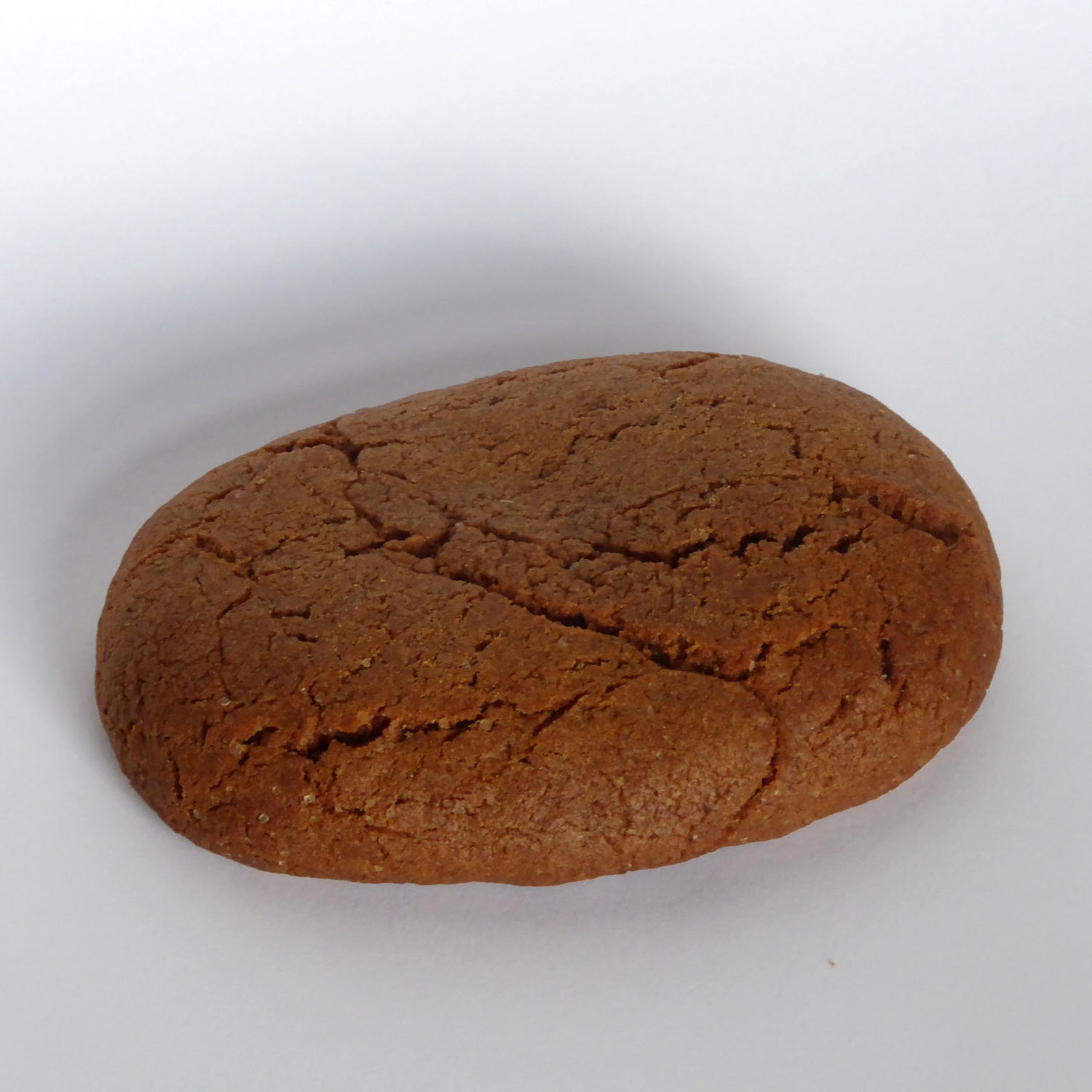
Hasselt speculaas

Hasselt speculaas is a type of speculaas originating from and only produced in Hasselt. It differs from the type of speculaas eaten in the rest of Belgium in its greater thickness, its smaller reliance on spices – which gives it a milder taste -, and in its structure, with a crispy crust and soft, doughy insides.

Speculaas was baked in Hasselt as early as the 14th century. According to tradition, Hasselt speculaas was eaten with chilled Jenever. The early 19th century saw the introduction of the Spéculation de Hasselt – the Hasselt speculaas -, which was soon exported to Brussels and to Liège, among others. Until the Second World War, Hasselt speculaas was only baked around Saint Nicholas Day, since then it has been sold throughout the entire year.

== Branding ==
Since the early 2000s, Hasselt has been known within Flanders for its distinctive and sometimes outspoken branding as a city. In 2002, former mayor, Steve Stevaert, introduced the catchphrase "Hasselt Capital of Taste" (Dutch: Hasselt Hoofdstad van de Smaak), creating a well-known brand image across the Flemish region to promote its touristic attractions, stores and local industries.

After 15 years the city decided to rebrand to "Hasselt has it" (Dutch: Hasselt heeft het). However, the city's old branding remained in use by its citizens and beyond. Five years later, due to this brand recognition, the city decided to reverse to the original catchphrase in spoken communication, and use "Hasselt Smaakmaker Spraakmaker" in written communication and visuals.

In 2023, a dating platform had selected Hasselt as the Belgian city with the most eligible singles. The city developed a tourism campaign based on this claim, showing diverse couples throughout the city within promotional videos and posters, while also strategically highlighting the claims of the dating platform. The campaign saw the use of a new catchphrase "Hasselt tastes like more" (Dutch: Hasselt smaakt naar meer), building further on their earlier catchphrase "Hasselt Capital of Taste".

== Economy ==
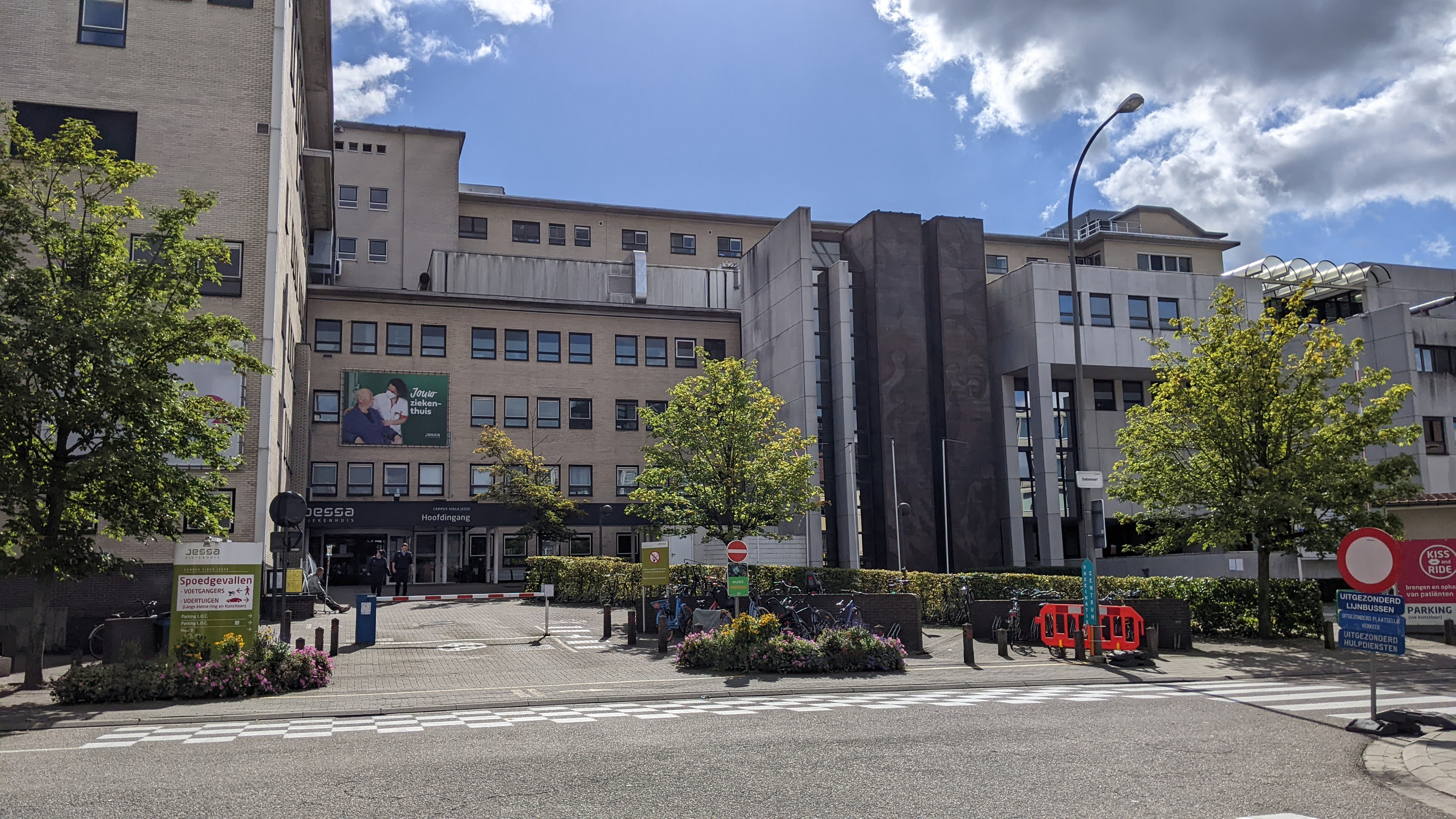
Main entrance to the city centre campus of the Jessa Hospital in 2022.

With 3,000 employees, the Jessa Hospital in Hasselt is the city's biggest employer with two health care campuses and one logistical campus. Cegeka Group, a European provider of IT solutions, services, and consultancy is also one of the city's largest employers, generating a turnover of €744 million. The city also provides an ecosystem for start-ups, scale-ups, and major companies through its Corda Campus, surrounded by government organizations and research institutions. Currently, 5,000 people work in 250 companies over a land area of 9 acres, formerly being occupied by Philips. By 2030, an investment of €150 million at the site is planned to generate employment for 7,500 people in 350 companies on an area of 14 acres.

=== Inventions ===
The Compact Cassette and Cassette Recorder were invented by a team of Belgian and Dutch engineers, led by the Lou Ottens, at Philips' Hasselt site in 1963. In 1983, a team of engineers developed one of the first compact disc (CD) devices at Philips Hasselt.

== Transport ==
=== Road ===
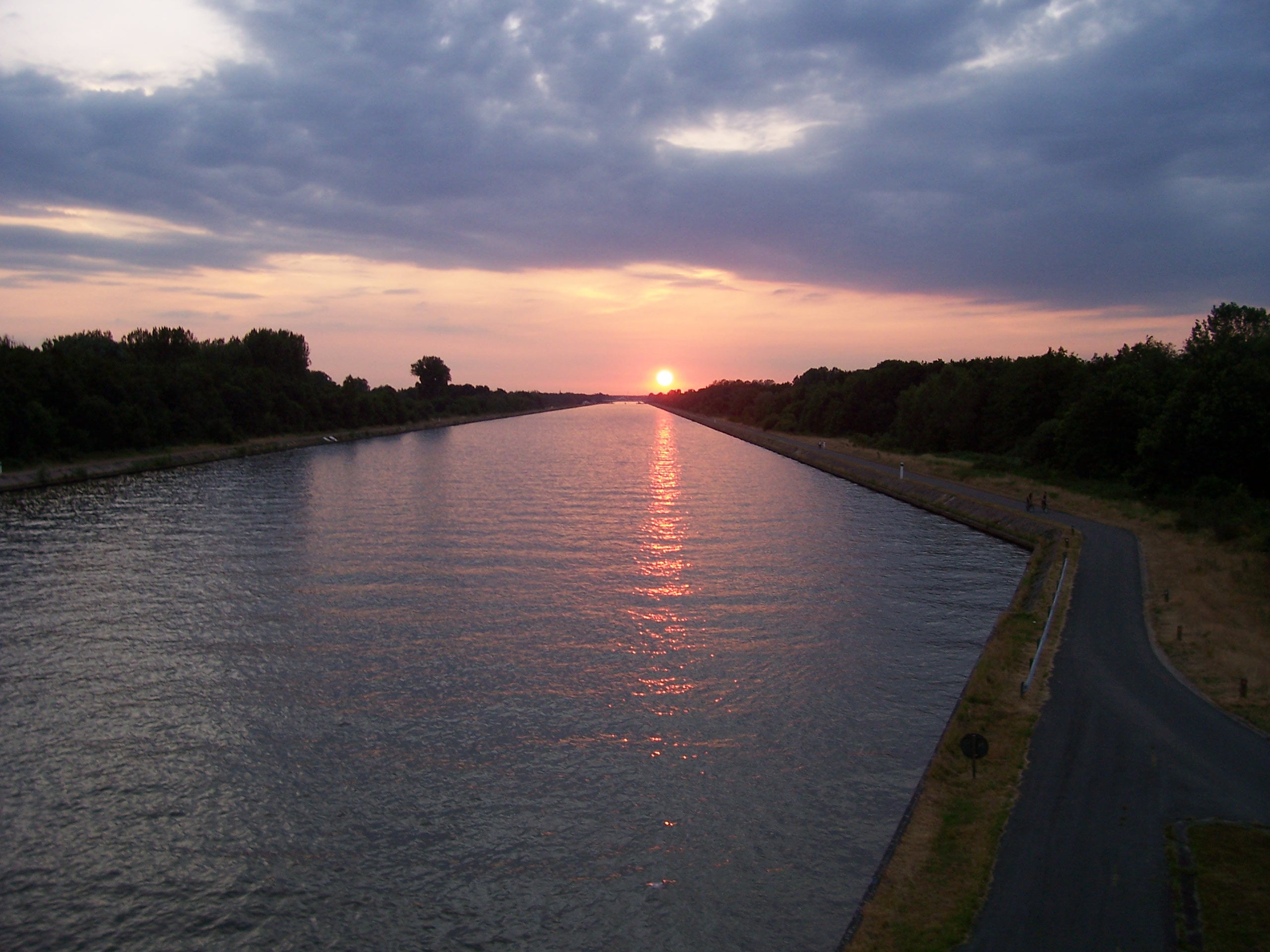
Albert Canal near Hasselt

Hasselt lies at the junction of important traffic arteries from several directions. The most important motorways are the European route E313 (Antwerp-Liège) and the European route E314 (Brussels-Aachen). The old town of Hasselt is enclosed by 2 ring roads. The outer ring road serves to keep traffic out of the city center and main residential areas. The inner ring road, the Green Boulevard, serves to keep traffic out of the commercial center, which is almost entirely a pedestrian area. There are also important traffic arteries to Tongeren, Sint-Truiden, Genk, and Diest.

=== Nearby airports ===
The city lies within approximately an hour's drive from the airports of Brussels, Liège, Antwerp, Charleroi, Eindhoven, Maastricht, Cologne/Bonn, and Düsseldorf. Within a three-hour radius, the major hubs of Paris, Amsterdam and Frankfurt can be reached. Some of these airports have direct public transport links via either train or intercity bus lines, like Flixbus.

=== Kiewit Airfield ===
The suburb of Kiewit, Hasselt is home to Belgium's oldest existing airfield, being also one of the oldest in the world. Kiewit Airfield opened in 1909, just six years after the Wright brothers' first flight. In October 1910, the first Belgian air show took place here.

Currently it is a recreational airfield with a single grass runway of 600m length with mixed activity of airplanes and gliders.

=== Bus ===
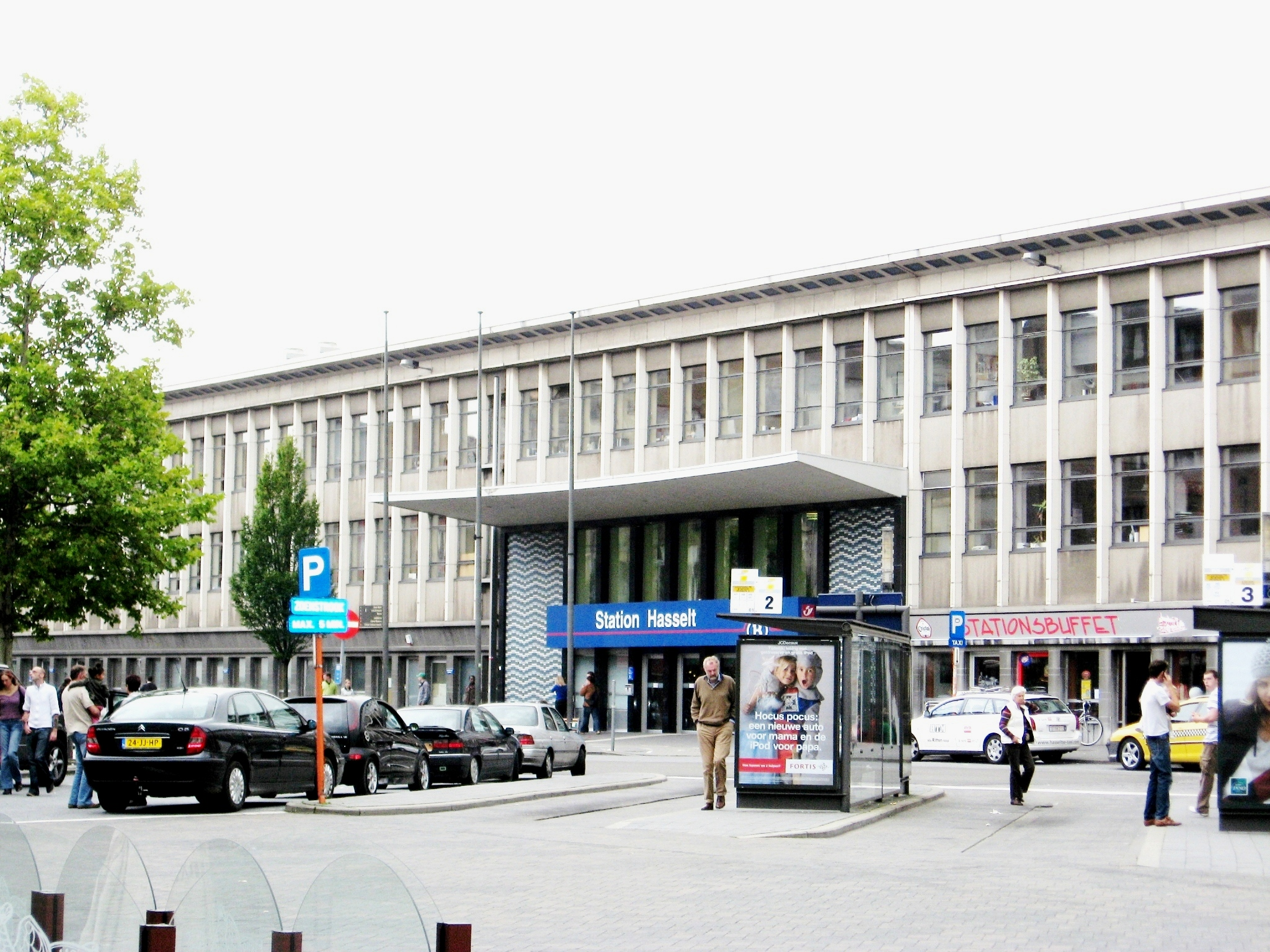
Hasselt's railway and bus station

Hasselt introduced a zero-fare policy for all public buses in 1997. By 2006, the usage of public transport had increased by 800–900% compared to pre-zero-fare numbers. In 2013, bus subsidies were reduced, resulting in the reintroduction of fares (60 cents per ride).

The city's official website records passenger growth as follows:

Passenger growth
| Year | Passengers | Percentage |
|---|---|---|
| 1996 | 360 000 | 100% |
| 1997 | 1,498,088 | 428% |
| 1998 | 2,837,975 | 810% |
| 1999 | 2,840,924 | 811% |
| 2000 | 3,178,548 | 908% |
| 2001 | 3,706,638 | 1059% |
| 2002 | 3,640,270 | 1040% |
| 2003 | 3,895,886 | 1113% |
| 2004 | 4,259,008 | 1217% |
| 2005 | 4,257,408 | 1216% |
| 2006 | 4,614,844 | 1319% |

A Belgian website describes Hasselt identity cards as becoming "like gold in value", because of free bus travel.

In 2013, Hasselt cancelled free public transportation due to financial reasons. The operator increased its claim towards the city, which the city could not pay. Now persons up to the age of 19 travel for free.

=== Rail ===
Hasselt railway station, run by NMBS, is located near the city centre, outside the innermost ring road. InterCity trains link the city to major Belgian centres such as Brussels, Antwerp, Liège, and Leuven, as well as to Brussels Airport.

==== Reopening of rail line 20 Hasselt – Maastricht ====
In February 2007, a plan was launched for the construction of an international light rail connection between Hasselt and Maastricht (Hasselt – Maastricht tramway). Agreements between the relevant governments were reached in June 2008 and December 2011. The line was planned to reduce the current travel time of 61 minutes by bus to only 36 minutes. Construction should have started in 2014, with the line expected to go into service in 2017. The construction eventually was delayed several times due to problems with the Wilhelminabrug in Maastricht, concerns about the profitability and the numbers of passengers making use of the planned line as well as opposition from the Hasselt city council regarding the planned route through the city. The Flemish government eventually stopped the project, with various Dutch governments reporting to have spent more than €20 million without any major construction happening. The line has now been proposed to be replaced by a so-called electric trambus system. However, concerns were raised too as the new alternative might not fulfill the cross-border high-quality public transport needs of the Dutch and Belgian provinces of Limburg.

Since end 2024, the reopening of rail line 20 between Hasselt and Maastricht is being reconsidered within Flanders, after the Dutch Government unveiled plans to demolish a vital railway bridge over the Meuse river in Maastricht.

== Climate ==
Climate data for Hasselt(1991–2020)
| Month | Jan | Feb | Mar | Apr | May | Jun | Jul | Aug | Sep | Oct | Nov | Dec | Year |
|---|---|---|---|---|---|---|---|---|---|---|---|---|---|
| Mean daily maximum °C (°F) | 6.2 (43.2) | 7.2 (45.0) | 11.1 (52.0) | 15.4 (59.7) | 19.2 (66.6) | 22.0 (71.6) | 24.1 (75.4) | 23.8 (74.8) | 20.1 (68.2) | 15.3 (59.5) | 10.1 (50.2) | 6.6 (43.9) | 15.1 (59.2) |
| Daily mean °C (°F) | 3.6 (38.5) | 4.0 (39.2) | 6.9 (44.4) | 10.2 (50.4) | 14.1 (57.4) | 17.0 (62.6) | 19.1 (66.4) | 18.7 (65.7) | 15.3 (59.5) | 11.4 (52.5) | 7.1 (44.8) | 4.2 (39.6) | 11.0 (51.7) |
| Mean daily minimum °C (°F) | 0.9 (33.6) | 0.8 (33.4) | 2.8 (37.0) | 5.1 (41.2) | 9.0 (48.2) | 12.0 (53.6) | 14.0 (57.2) | 13.5 (56.3) | 10.5 (50.9) | 7.5 (45.5) | 4.1 (39.4) | 1.8 (35.2) | 6.8 (44.3) |
| Average precipitation mm (inches) | 66.9 (2.63) | 62.1 (2.44) | 56.6 (2.23) | 45.3 (1.78) | 60.7 (2.39) | 74.7 (2.94) | 75.1 (2.96) | 90.2 (3.55) | 64.0 (2.52) | 64.6 (2.54) | 67.5 (2.66) | 81.3 (3.20) | 809 (31.84) |
| Average precipitation days (≥ 1.0 mm) | 12.9 | 11.9 | 11.6 | 9.5 | 10.3 | 10.4 | 10.6 | 11.3 | 10.2 | 11.3 | 12.6 | 14.8 | 137.4 |
| Mean monthly sunshine hours | 62 | 78 | 134 | 188 | 214 | 216 | 221 | 210 | 164 | 119 | 70 | 50 | 1,726 |
| Mean daily sunshine hours | 2.0 | 2.8 | 4.3 | 6.3 | 6.9 | 7.2 | 7.1 | 6.8 | 5.5 | 3.8 | 2.3 | 1.6 | 4.7 |
Source: KMI

== Education ==
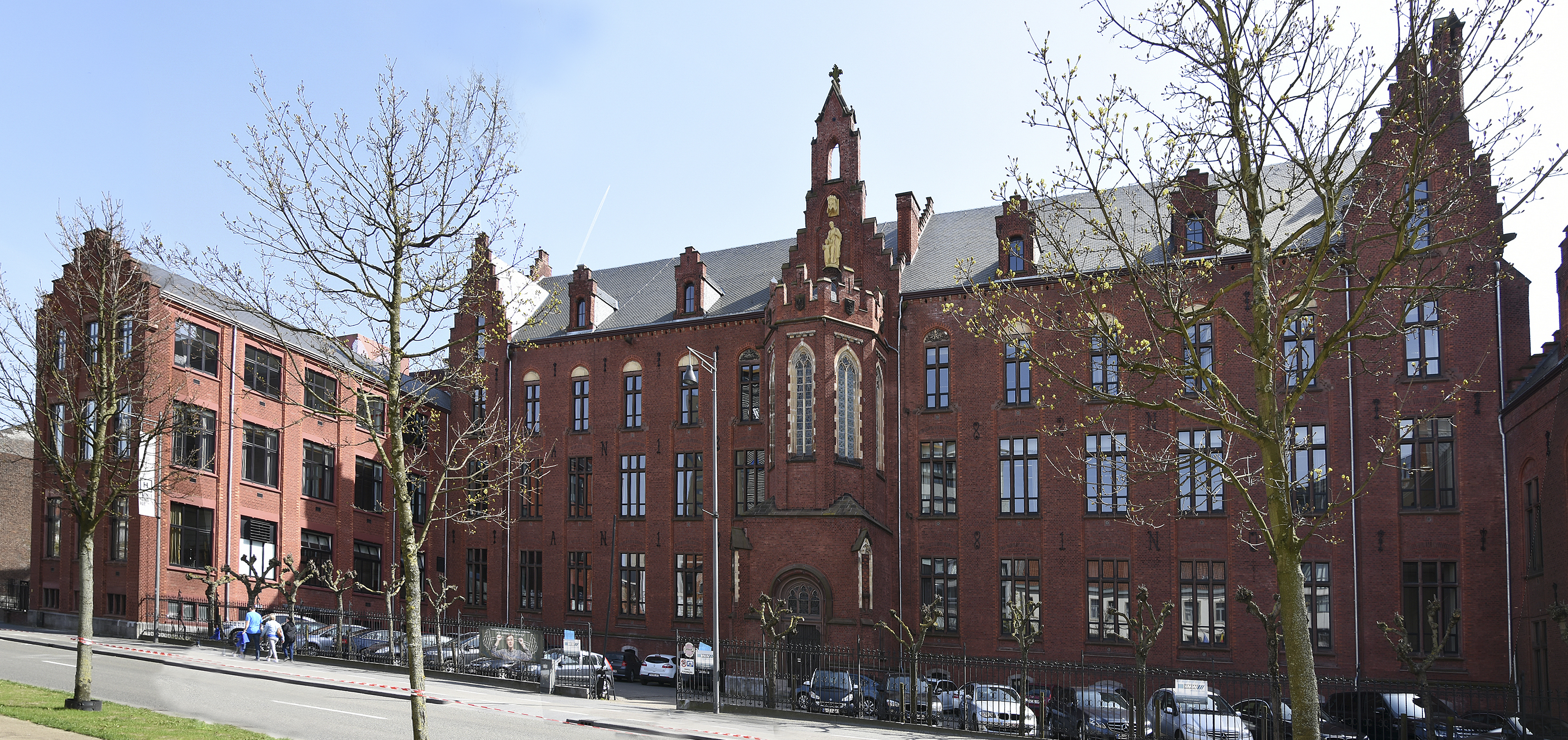
Virga Jessecollege

Hasselt has two university colleges: University College PXL and University Colleges Leuven-Limburg (UCLL). These offer courses in healthcare, social work, art, commercial sciences, and teacher training, among others.

Hasselt University, established in 1971, operates campuses in the city and in the neighbouring town of Diepenbeek and, as of 2025, has more than 8,000 students and 1,800 academic, administrative, and technical staff. The university houses 7 faculties, 4 research institutes, 3 research centres, and 3 doctoral schools. In the 2023 Times Higher Education Young University Ranking, which ranks the world's best universities under 50 years old, Hasselt University was ranked 35th out of 605.

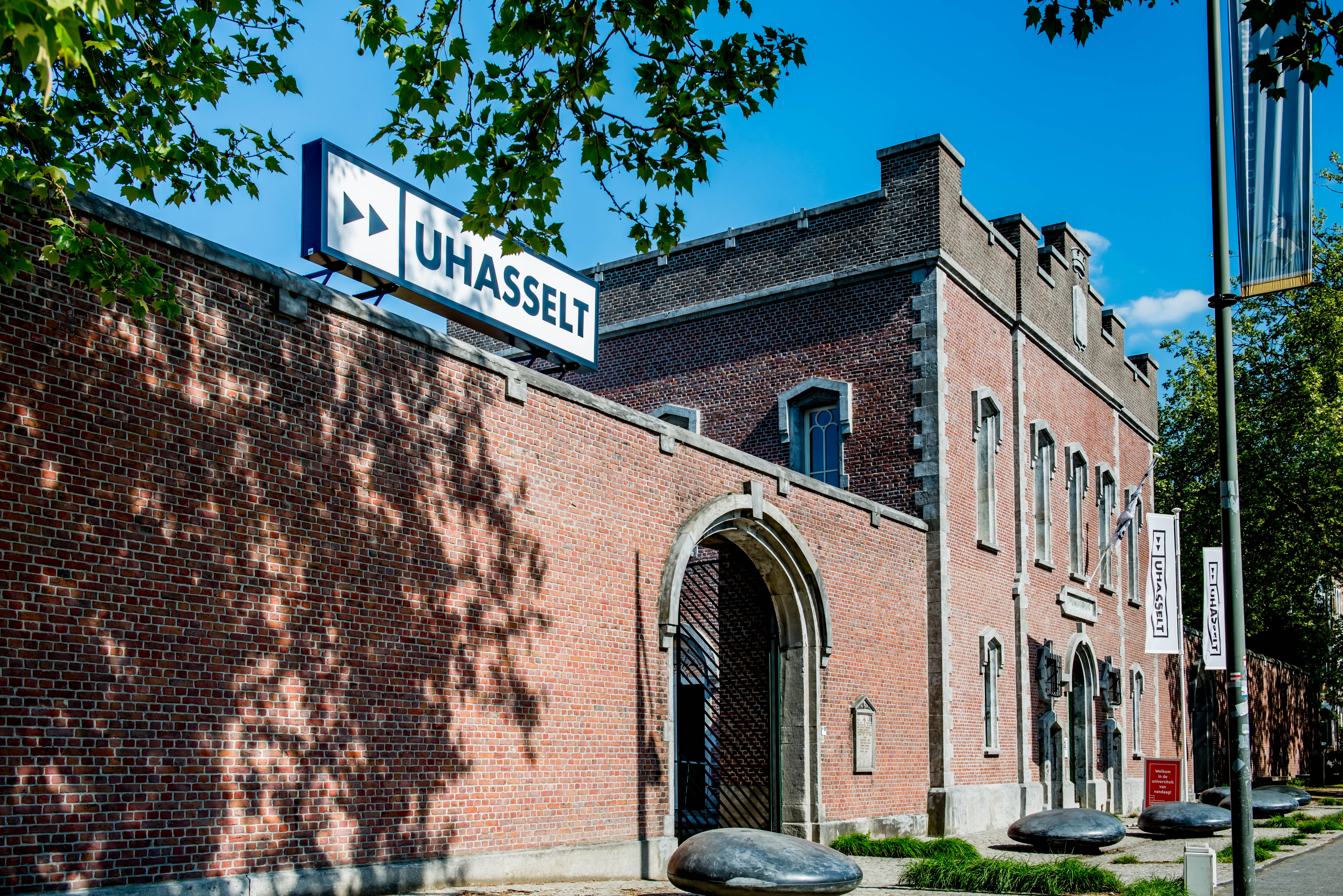
Faculty of Law at Hasselt University, based in the former city prison since 2012

== Sports ==
Hasselt is home to Limburg United, one of the Belgium's top professional basketball teams. The team plays its home games at Sporthal Alverberg. The city's largest football club is Sporting Hasselt, which plays its home games at Stedelijk Sportstadion Hasselt. The city's rugby club is RC Hasselt.

== Notable people ==
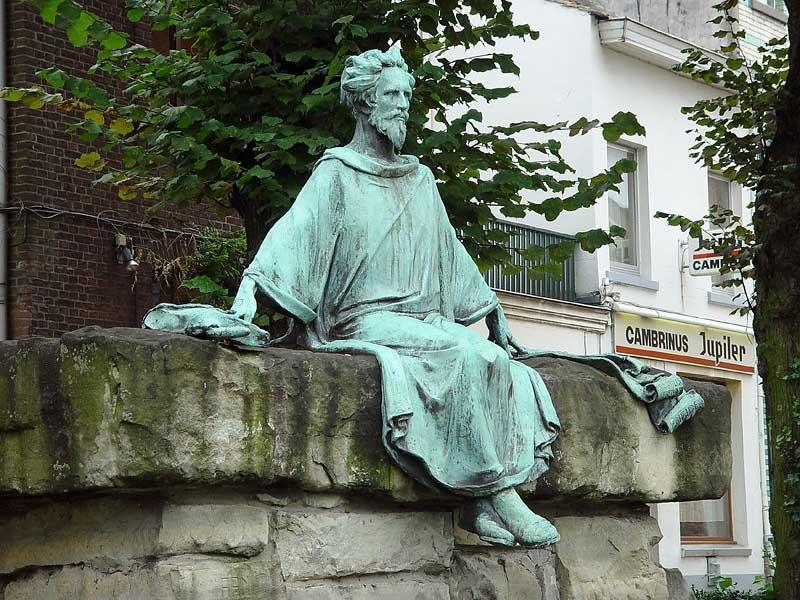
Hendrik van Veldeke

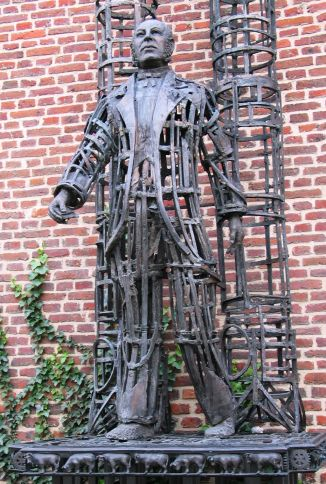
Doctor Louis Willems

=== Born in Hasselt ===
- Hendrik van Veldeke, writer of romance, lyric, and hagiography; first vernacular writer in the Low Countries (c. 1140–c. 1190)
- Francis Rombouts, Mayor of New York City from 1679 to 1680
- Jean-Joseph Thonissen, professor at law and former Belgian Minister of State (1817–1891)
- Louis Willems, doctor and one of the pioneers of bacteriology and immunology (1822–1907)
- Adrien de Gerlache, officer of the Belgian Navy and leader of the Belgian Antarctic Expedition (1866–1934)
- Joannes Henricus Paulus Bellefroid, legal scholar and professor, Flemish activist (1869–1959)
- Willy Claes, politician and former Secretary General of NATO (b. 1938)
- Guy Bleus, artist (b. 1950)
- Dana Winner, singer (b. 1965)
- Stef Driesen, Antwerp-based artist (b. 1966)
- Luc Nilis, footballer (b. 1967)
- Axelle Red, singer-songwriter (b. 1968)
- Louis Machiels, racing driver (b. 1971)
- Regi Penxten, artist, producer (b. 1976)
- Hannelore Knuts, Actress and fashion model (b. 1977)
- Anthony Kumpen, racing driver (b. 1978)
- Bram Castro, footballer (b. 1982)
- Daniel Guijo-Velasco, footballer (b. 1984)
- Brecht Evens, Paris-based graphic novelist and illustrator (b. 1986)
- Matteo Simoni (b. 1987)
- Laurens Vanthoor, racing driver (b. 1991)
- Casper de Norre, footballer (b. 1997)
- Max Verstappen, four-time Formula One World Drivers' Champion (b. 1997)
- Dries Vanthoor, racing driver (b. 1998)

=== Lived in Hasselt ===
- Valentinus Paquay, Roman Catholic priest and member of the Order of Friars Minor (1828–1905)
- Luuk Gruwez, poet (b. 1953)
- Steve Stevaert, politician (1954–2015)
- Charlotte Adigéry, singer, musician (b. 1990)

== Twin and partner cities ==
- Germany: Detmold (since 1976)
- Netherlands: Sittard-Geleen (since 1980)
- Japan: Itami, Hyogo (since 1985)
- United States: Mountain View, California (since 1987)
- (Europe) Hasselt is a member city of Eurotowns network
