= Wimmertingen =

Sub-municipality of the city of Hasselt, Belgium

- Sub-municipality of Hasselt
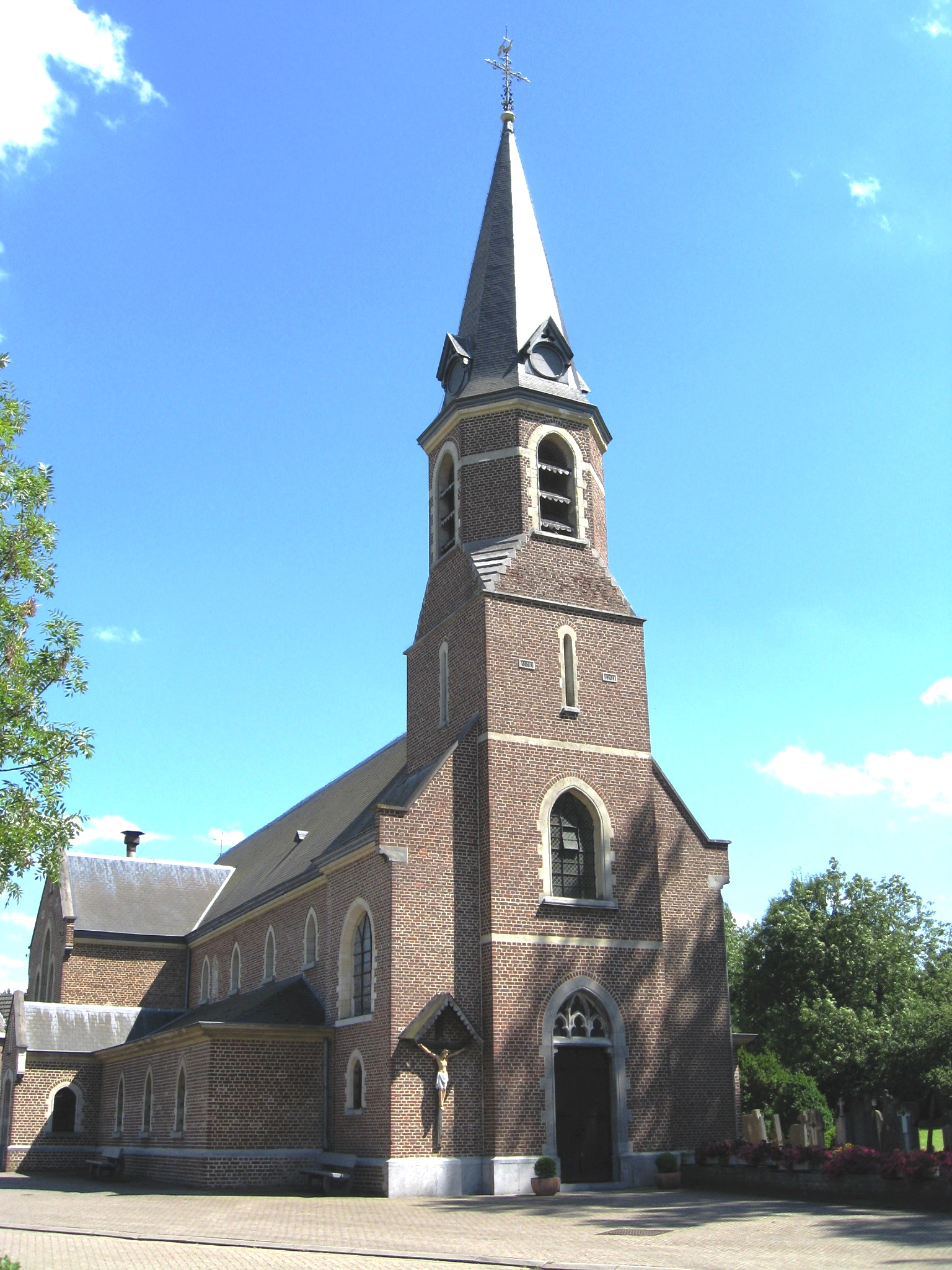
- Saint Nicholas Church
- Interactive map of Wimmertingen
- Location within Belgium Location within Limburg (Belgium)
- Coordinates: 50°53′00″N 5°21′00″E
- Country: Belgium
- Community: Flemish Community
- Region: Flemish Region
- Province: Limburg
- Arrondissement: Hasselt
- Municipality: Hasselt

Area
  - Total: 1.08 km^{2} (0.42 sq mi)

Population (2020-01-01)
  - Total: 308
  - Density: 285/km^{2} (739/sq mi)
- Postal codes: 3501
- Area codes: 011

Wimmertingen (Dutch pronunciation: [ˈʋɪmərˌtɪŋə(n)]) is a sub-municipality of the city of Hasselt located in the province of Limburg, Flemish Region, Belgium. It was a separate municipality until 1977. On 1 January 1977, it was merged into Hasselt.
