= RC Hasselt =

Belgian rugby union club, based in Hasselt

Rugby Club Hasselt
- Founded: 2010; 16 years ago
- Location: Hasselt, Belgium
Team kit

RC Hasselt is a Belgian rugby union club in Hasselt.

== History ==
The club was founded in 2010 in its present form, though there had been a rugby team before.
