= Stevoort =

Sub-municipality of the city of Hasselt, Belgium

- Sub-municipality of Hasselt
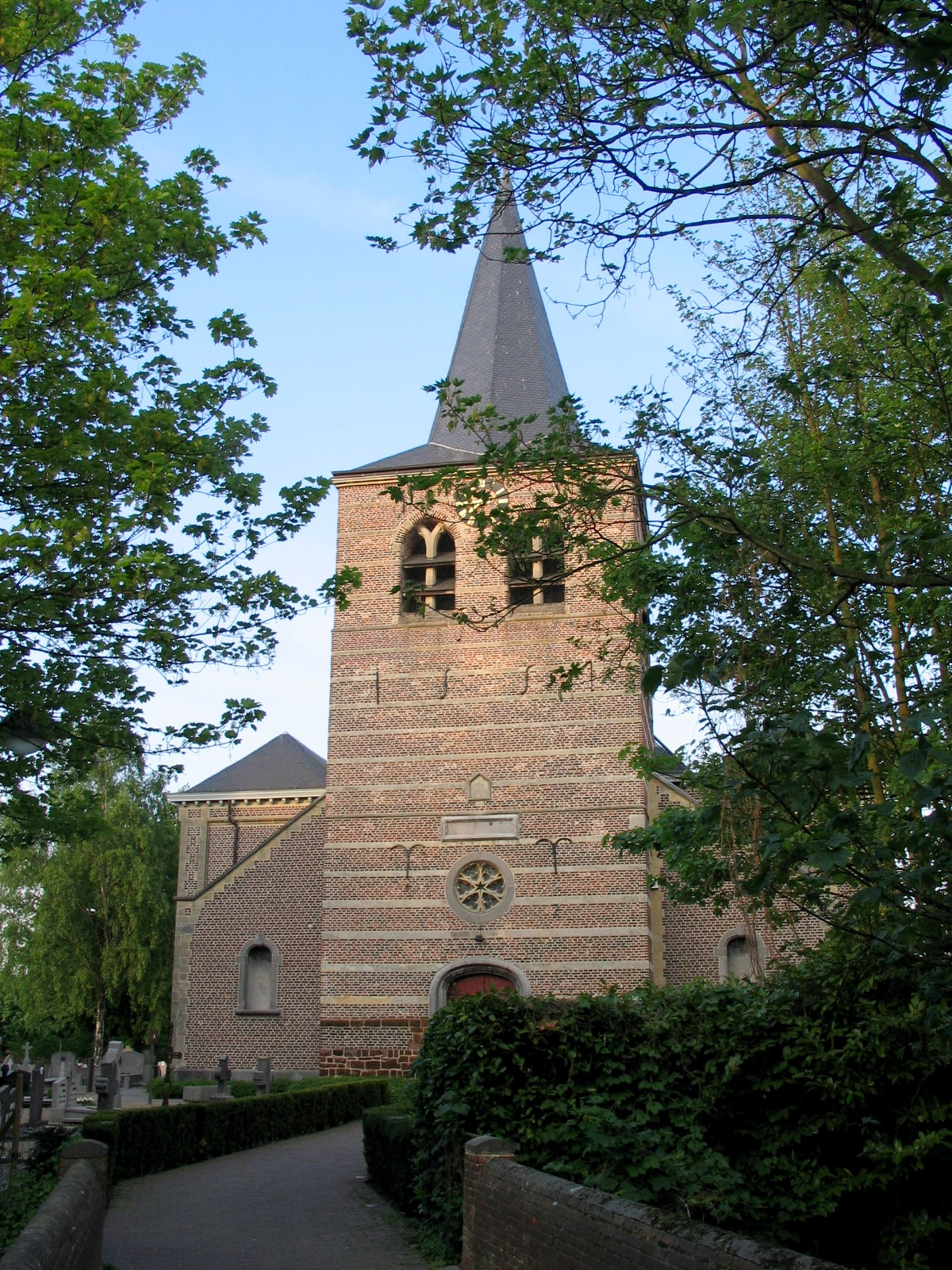
- Saint Martin's Church
- Interactive map of Stevoort
- Location within Belgium Location within Limburg (Belgium)
- Coordinates: 50°55′00″N 5°15′00″E
- Country: Belgium
- Community: Flemish Community
- Region: Flemish Region
- Province: Limburg
- Arrondissement: Hasselt
- Municipality: Hasselt

Area
  - Total: 12.03 km^{2} (4.64 sq mi)

Population (2020-01-01)
  - Total: 3,678
  - Density: 305.7/km^{2} (791.9/sq mi)
- Postal codes: 3512
- Area codes: 011
- Website: stevoort.eu%20stevoort.eu

Stevoort (Dutch pronunciation: [ˈsteːvoːrt]) is a sub-municipality of the city of Hasselt located in the province of Limburg, Flemish Region, Belgium. It was a separate municipality until 1977. On 1 January 1977, it was merged into Hasselt.
