= Kiewit =

- Village
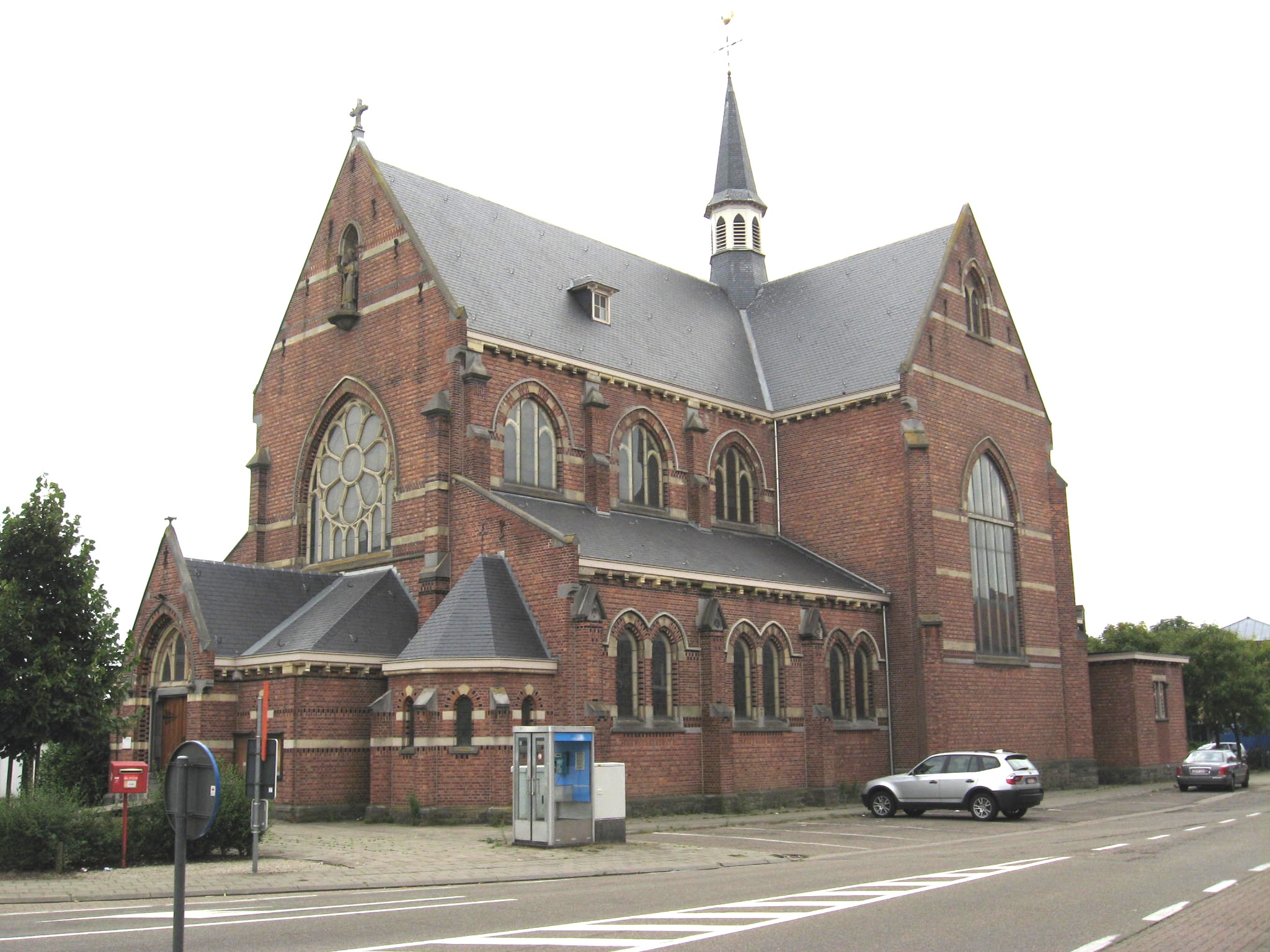
- Kiewit's parish church

- Location in Belgium
- Coordinates: 50°57′51″N 5°21′17″E
- Country: Belgium
- Community: Flemish Community
- Province: Limburg
- Municipality: Hasselt

Area
  - Total: 7.32 km^{2} (2.83 sq mi)

Population (2021)
  - Total: 3,700
  - Density: 510/km^{2} (1,300/sq mi)
- Time zone: CET

Kiewit (Dutch pronunciation: [ˈkiʋɪt]) is a Belgian parish and village within the northernmost extension of the Flemish municipality of Hasselt. It also borders on the municipality of Zonhoven to the north and Genk to the east, with Kuringen, another part of Hasselt, to the west.

== History ==
Until the 20th century, Kiewit was relatively uninhabited and was composed of open heathland and pastures between the older settlements at Kuringen, Hasselt, Zonhoven, and Bokrijk. Kiewit is the section of these lands which was claimed by Hasselt. Kiewit became a parish within the Belgian Catholic church in 1927, and the population concentrated at first in the area around the parish church.

== Transport ==
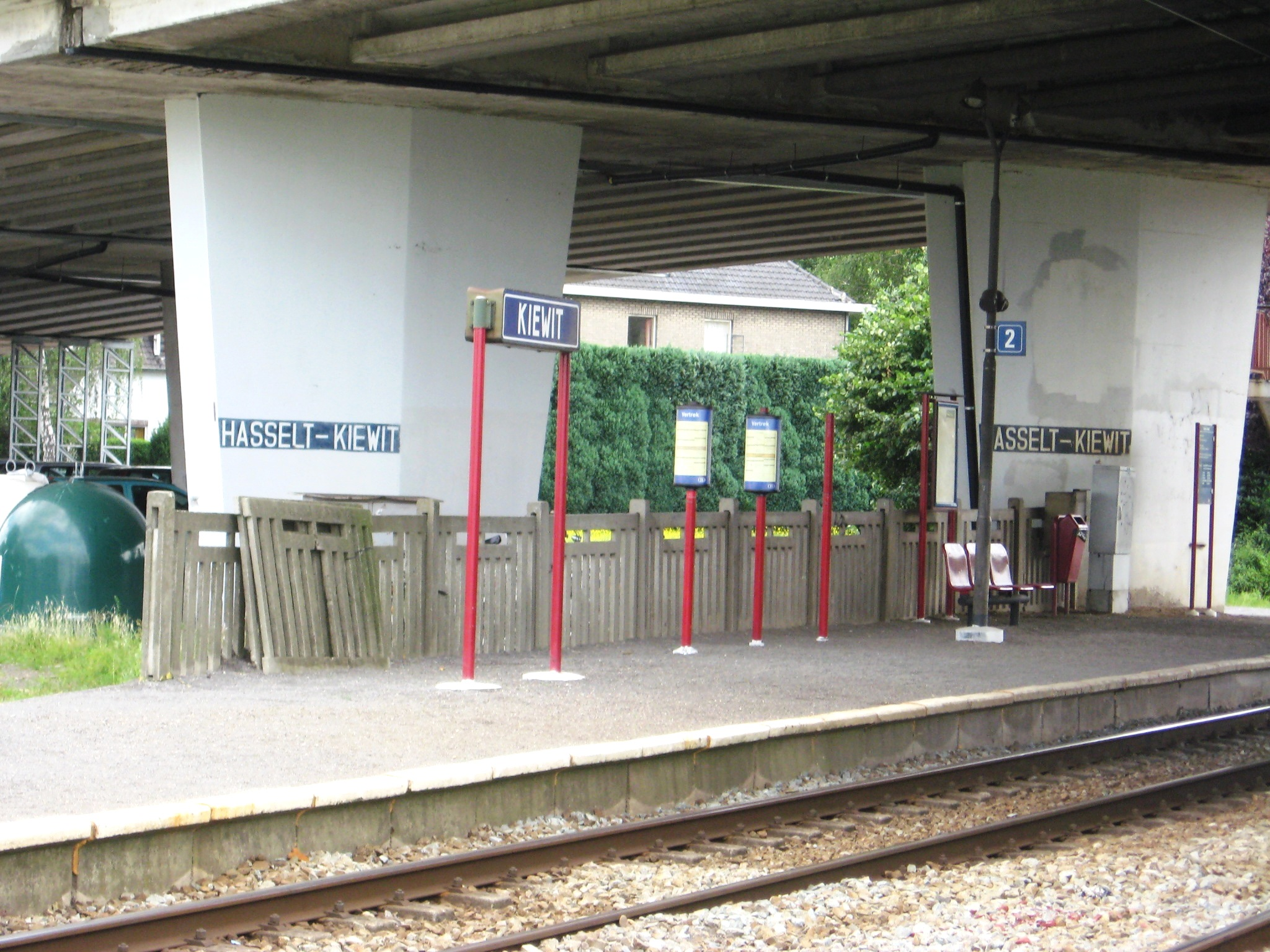
Kiewit train station

Kiewit is on the main road between Hasselt and Eindhoven, which cuts through the village. Kiewit also has its own train station situated in the south.

== Sights worth seeing ==
- Kiewit airfield, the oldest aerodrome in Belgium
- The parish church (Catholic) dedicated to Saint Lambert and dating from 1935
- Boundary marker ("paalsteen") dating to 1666 between Hasselt, Zonhoven, and Kuringen.

== Annual events ==
- Pukkelpop
- Rimpelrock

== Nature and recreation ==
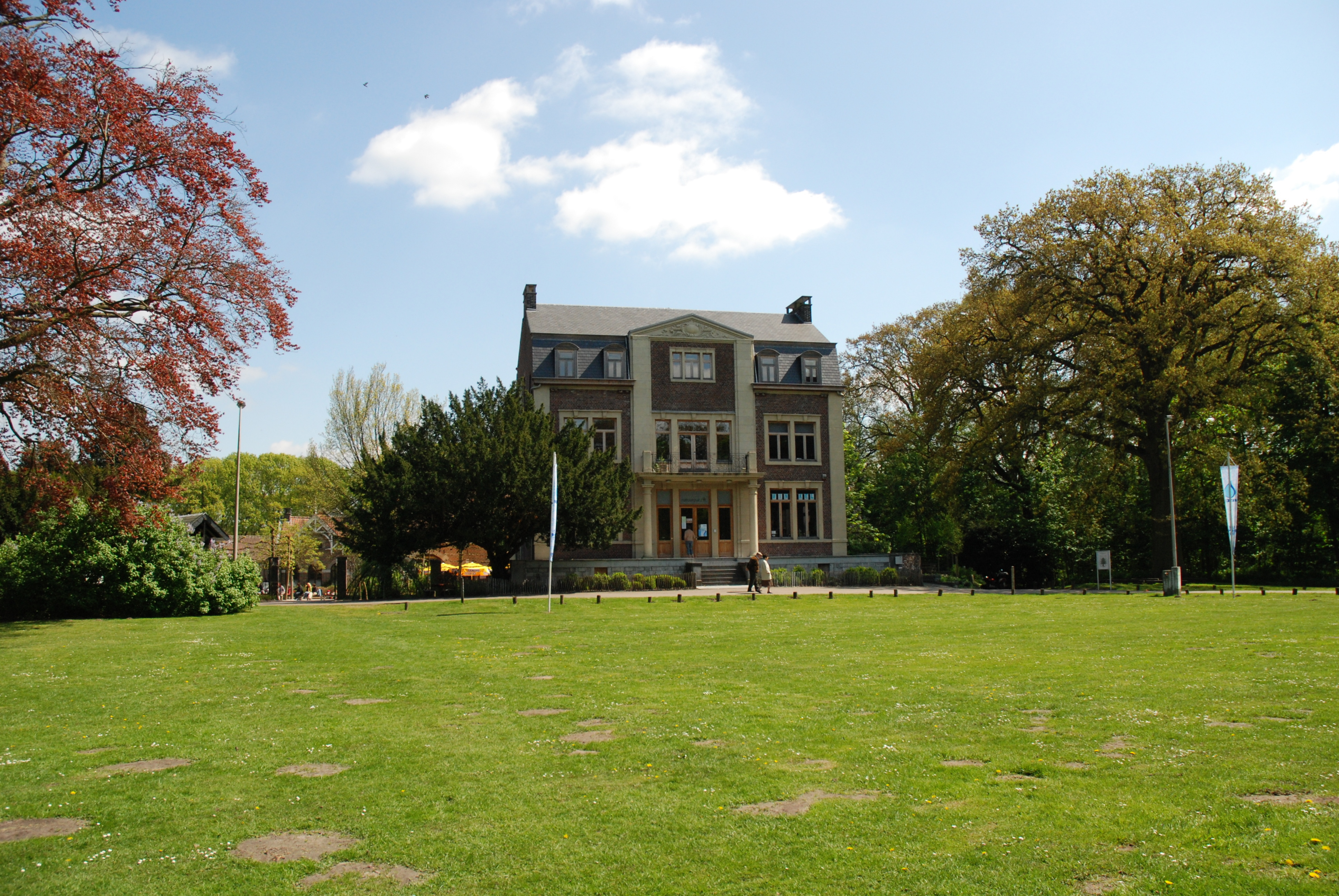
Domein Kiewit

The Natuurdomein Kiewit (Nature domain) is in the east of Kiewit centred on an old manor house, and is a "nature centre" under the city of Hasselt with an area of about 100 hectares. It touches the Provincial domain of Bokrijk, in Genk, and is also linked to it with bicycle paths. It has a children farm and a project to let Galloway cattle maintain the grasslands.

== Famous inhabitants ==
- Willy Claes (born 1938), politician and former Secretary General of NATO
