= Diepenbeek =

- Municipality
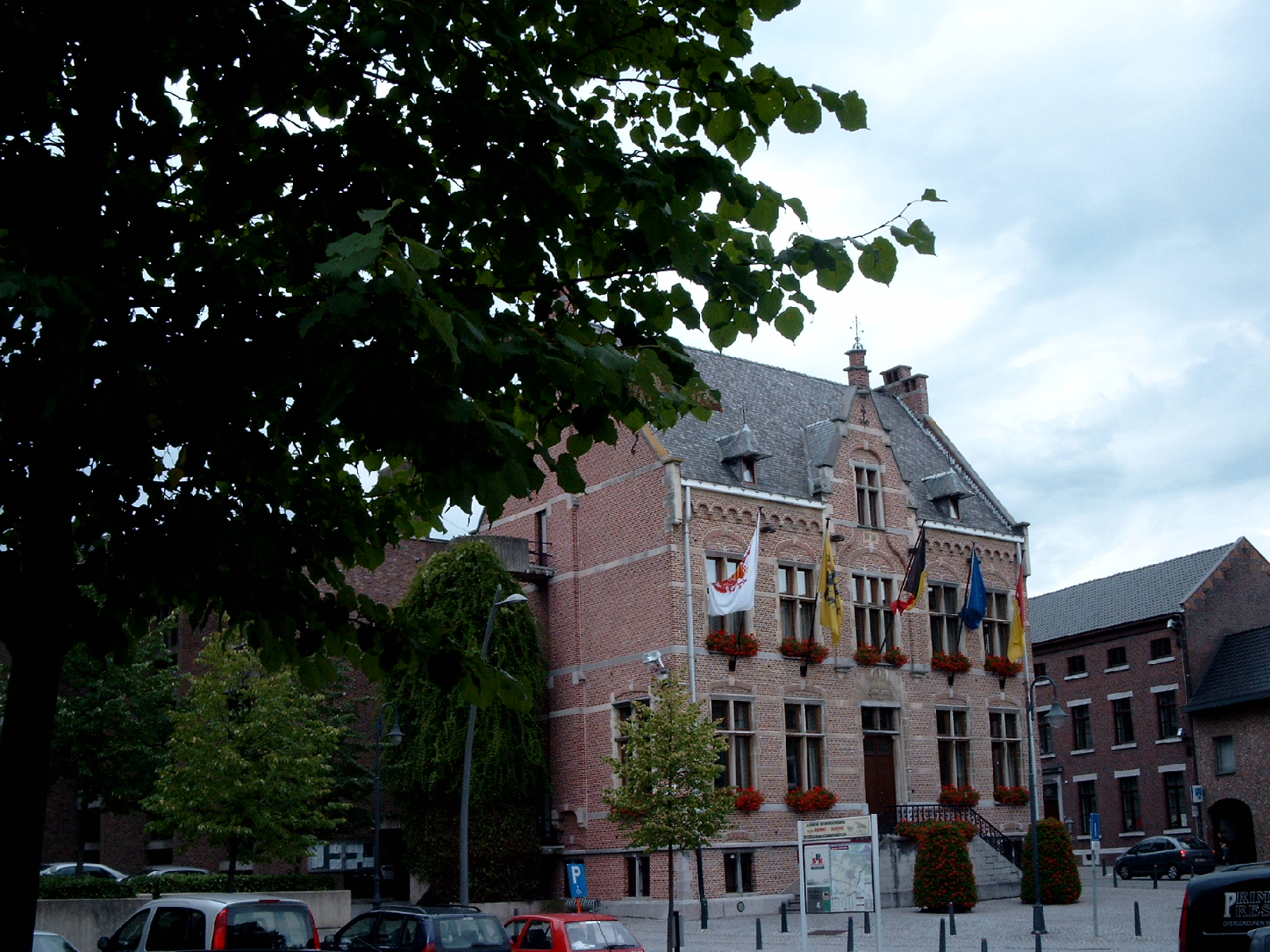
- Diepenbeek town hall

- Flag Coat of arms

- Location of Diepenbeek in Limburg
- Interactive map of Diepenbeek
- Location in Belgium
- Coordinates: 50°54′N 05°24′E
- Country: Belgium
- Community: Flemish Community
- Region: Flemish Region
- Province: Limburg
- Arrondissement: Hasselt

Government
  - Mayor: Rik Kriekels (N-VA)
  - Governing parties: N-VA, CD&V, Open Vld, Groen

Area
  - Total: 41.41 km^{2} (15.99 sq mi)

Population (2018-01-01)
  - Total: 19,137
  - Density: 462.1/km^{2} (1,197/sq mi)
- Postal codes: 3590
- NIS code: 71011
- Area codes: 011
- Website: www.diepenbeek.be

Diepenbeek (Dutch pronunciation: [ˈdipə(m)beːk]; Limburgish: Diepenbik) is a municipality located in the Belgian province of Limburg near Hasselt. On January 1, 2012, Diepenbeek had a total population of 18,337. Its total area is 41.19 km^{2} (15.90 sq mi) which gives a population density of 430 inhabitants per square kilometre (1,100 inhabitants/mi^{2}).

The municipality includes the communities and hamlets of Bijenberg, het Crijt, Dorpheide, Keizel, Lutselus, Pampert, Piannesberg, Reitje, Rooierheide, Rozendaal, and Zwartveld.

It is home to Hasselt University, although the University also has buildings in Hasselt itself. The Limburg Science Park is also located on the university campus in Diepenbeek.
