= European route E34 in the Netherlands =

European route E 34
- Europese weg E34
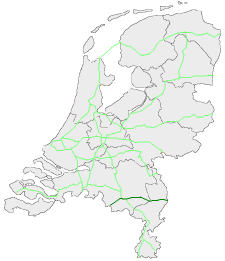
- European routes in the Netherlands with E 34 in dark green

Route information
- Maintained by Rijkswaterstaat

Major junctions
- West end: E34 / A21 at Belgium border
- E25 / A 2 / N 2 in Eindhoven; E25 / A 2 / N 2 in Eindhoven; A 73 in Venlo
- East end: E34 / A 40 at Germany border

Location
- Country: Kingdom of the Netherlands
- Constituent country: Netherlands
- Provinces: North Brabant, Limburg

Highway system
- International E-road network; A Class; B Class
← E31	→ E35

European route E 34 (E 34) is a west–east European route, running from Zeebrugge in Belgium, through the Netherlands, to Bad Oeynhausen in Germany.

The highway is maintained by Rijkswaterstaat.

== Exit list ==
Province	Municipality	km	mi	Exit	Name	Destinations	Notes
North Brabant	Bladel	0.1	0.062	—	—	E34 / A21 – Antwerp	Continuation into Belgium; west end of A67 overlap
North Brabant	Bladel	6.0	3.7	29	Hapert	N 284 north – Hapert, Bladel, Reusel	
North Brabant	Eersel	9.9	6.2	30	Eersel	N 397 south / Steenovens – Eersel, Bergeijk, Valkenswaard	
North Brabant	Veldhoven	14.7	9.1	31	Veldhoven-West		
North Brabant	Eindhoven	18.5	11.5	—	De Hogt Interchange	E25 / A 2 / N 2 – Eindhoven, 's-Hertogenbosch, Nijmegen, Waalre, Tilburg	West end of E 25 and A2 overlap
North Brabant	Eindhoven	23.4	14.5	—	Leenderheide Interchange	E25 / A 2 / N 2 west / Leenderweg – Eindhoven, Maastricht, Waalre	East end of E 25 and A2 overlap
North Brabant	Geldrop-Mierlo	27.9	17.3	34	Geldrop	Bogardeind / Geldropseweg	
North Brabant	Someren	37.3	23.2	35	Someren	N 266 south (Rijksweg) / N 612 north (Rijksweg) – Someren, Lierop, Helmond	
North Brabant	Asten	42.0	26.1	36	Asten, Netherlands	N 279 – Asten, Netherlands, Meijel, Deurne, Netherlands	
North Brabant	Deurne	49.7	30.9	37	Liessel	Koeweideweg	
Limburg	Helden	58.3	36.2	38	Helden	N 277 (Midden Peelweg) – Helden, Maasbree, Sevenum	
Limburg	Venlo	65.3	40.6	39	Sevenum	N 566 (Eindhovenseweg) / Columbusweg / Van Heemskerckweg – Venlo, Sevenum	
Limburg	Venlo	68.7	42.7	—	Zaarderheiken Interchange	A 73 – Venray, Nijmegen, Maastricht, Venlo, Mönchengladbach	
Limburg	Velden, Limburg	71.8	44.6	40	Velden, Limburg	N 271 (Nijmeegseweg / Rijksweg) / Ketelbergweg – Velden, Limburg, Venlo	
Limburg	Venlo	73.8	45.9	41	Venlo	Weselseweg	
Limburg	Venlo	75.1	46.7	—	—	E34 / A 40 – Herongen, Duisburg	Continuation into Germany; east end of A67 overlap
1.000 mi = 1.609 km; 1.000 km = 0.621 mi: Concurrency terminus; Unopened

== See also ==
European route E34
Previous country: Belgium	Netherlands	Next country: Germany
