= A67 motorway (Netherlands) =

Motorway in the Netherlands

A67 motorway
- Rijksweg 67
- Location of the A67 motorway

Major junctions
- West end: Hapert; A21 border with Belgium
- East end: Venlo; A 40 border with Germany

Location
- Country: Kingdom of the Netherlands
- Constituent country: Netherlands
- Provinces: North Brabant

Highway system
- Roads in the Netherlands; Motorways; E-roads; Provincial; City routes

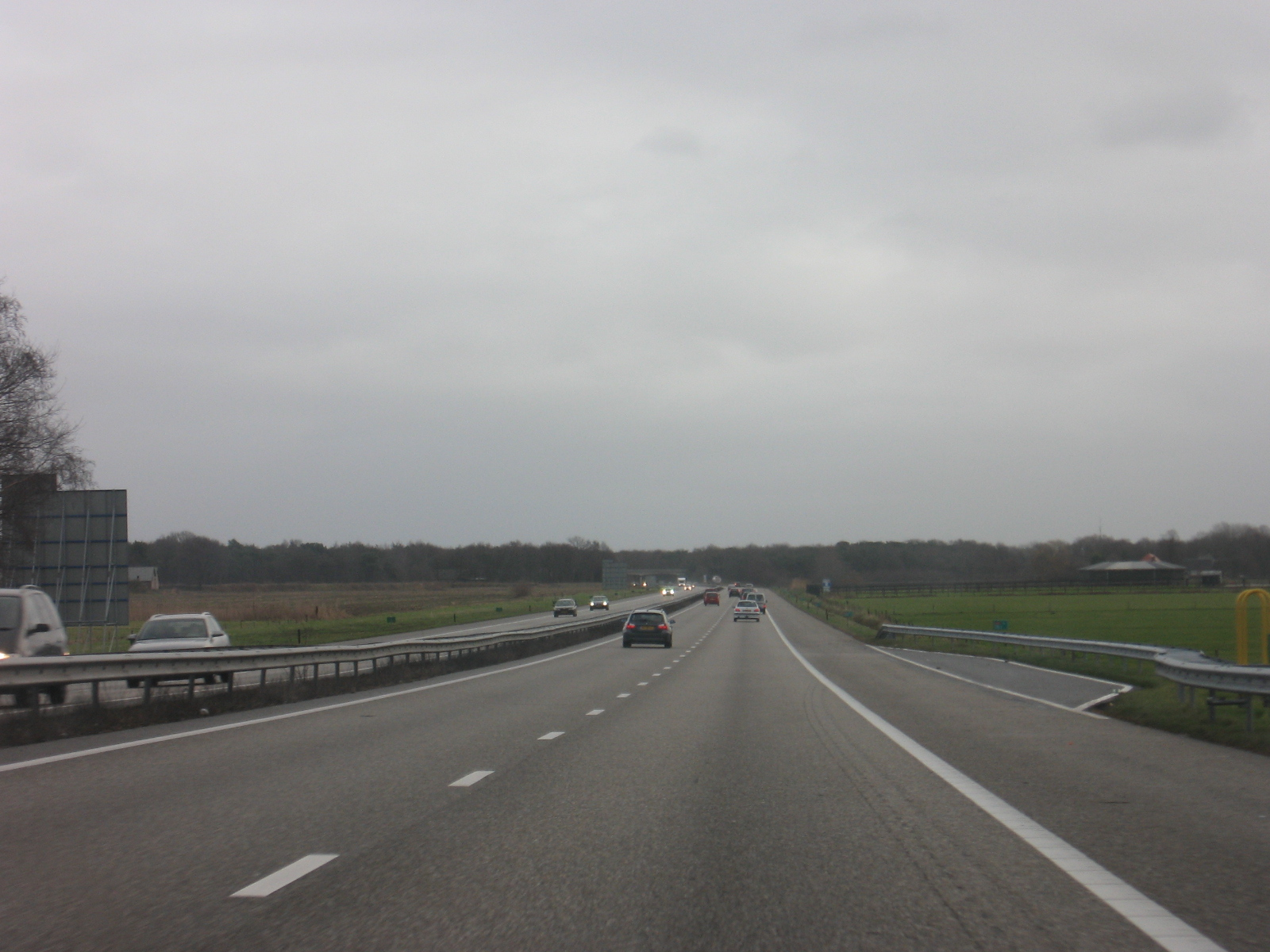
The A67 near Venlo.

The A67 motorway is a motorway in the Netherlands. It is located in the Dutch provinces of North Brabant and Limburg.

== Overview ==
The road is approximately 75 kilometer in length. The A67 motorway connects the Belgian border (A21/E34 road) near Hapert with Eindhoven and the German border (A40 road) near Venlo. Along the entire stretch of the motorway, the European route E34 travels along the A67. Besides, the section near Eindhoven, between interchanges De Hogt and Leenderheide, is shared with the A2 motorway and European route E25.

In the past, traffic from the Eindhoven area towards the German Autobahn A61 had to take exit 41, and then travel along local roads for approximately 7 kilometers before they reached the border and the start of the German A61. Since 4 April 2012, a connection between the Dutch A73 and the German A61 is in operation (the A74), which gives drivers the possibility to travel between the Dutch A67 and the German A61 without having to leave the motorway.

== Exit list ==
Province	Municipality	km	mi	Exit	Name	Destinations	Notes
North Brabant	Bladel	0	0.0	—	—	E34 / A21	Border with Belgium; this road continues as the Belgian A21; west end of E 34 overlap
North Brabant	Bladel	5	3.1	29	Hapert	N 284 north (provincialeweg)	
North Brabant	Eersel	10	6.2	30	Eersel	N 397 southeast (provincialeweg) / Steenovens	
North Brabant	Veldhoven	15	9.3	31	Valkenswaard	N 69	
North Brabant	Eindhoven	19	12	—	Interchange De Hogt	E25 / A 2 / N 2	West end of E 25, A2 and N2 overlap
North Brabant	Eindhoven	20	12	32a	High Tech Campus Eindhoven	High Tech Campus	
North Brabant	Eindhoven	22	14	33	Waalre		
North Brabant	Eindhoven	23	14	—	Interchange Leenderheide	E25 / A 2 / N 2 west / Leenderweg	East end of E 25, A2 and N2 overlap
North Brabant	Geldrop-Mierlo	28	17	34	Geldrop	Bogardeind	
North Brabant	Someren	37	23	35	Someren	N 266 south (Rijksweg) / N 612 north (Rijksweg)	
North Brabant	Asten	42	26	36	Asten	N 279	
North Brabant	Deurne	50	31	37	Liessel	Koeweideweg	
Limburg	Helden	58	36	38	Helden	N 275 south (Sevenumsedijk) / N 277 (Midden Peelweg)	
Limburg	Venlo	65	40	39	Sevenum	N 566 (Eindhovenseweg) / Columbusweg / Van Heemskerckweg	
Limburg	Venlo	69	43	—	Interchange Zaarderheiken	A 73	
Limburg	Arcen en Velden	72	45	40	Velden	N 271 (Nijmeegseweg / Rijksweg) / Ketelbergweg	
Limburg	Venlo	74	46	41	Venlo	Wisselweg	
Limburg	Venlo			—	—	E34 / A 40	Border with Germany; this road continues as the German A40; east end of E 34 overlap
1.000 mi = 1.609 km; 1.000 km = 0.621 mi: Concurrency terminus; Unopened
