= European route E34 =

Road in trans-European E-road network

E34

Major junctions
- West end: Zeebrugge, Belgium
- East end: Bad Oeynhausen, Germany

Location
- Countries: Belgium; Netherlands; Germany

Highway system
- International E-road network; A Class; B Class

European route E34 forms part of the United Nations International E-road network. It connects Zeebrugge, the major seaport of Bruges, with Bad Oeynhausen, a German spa town located beside the River Weser at the eastern edge of North Rhine-Westphalia. At Bad Oeynhausen the E34 links to the E30, a major pan European east-west artery. It also passes, relatively briefly, through the Netherlands, following the southern by-pass of Eindhoven. Within Germany the route follows from south-west to north-east the full length of North Rhine-Westphalia.

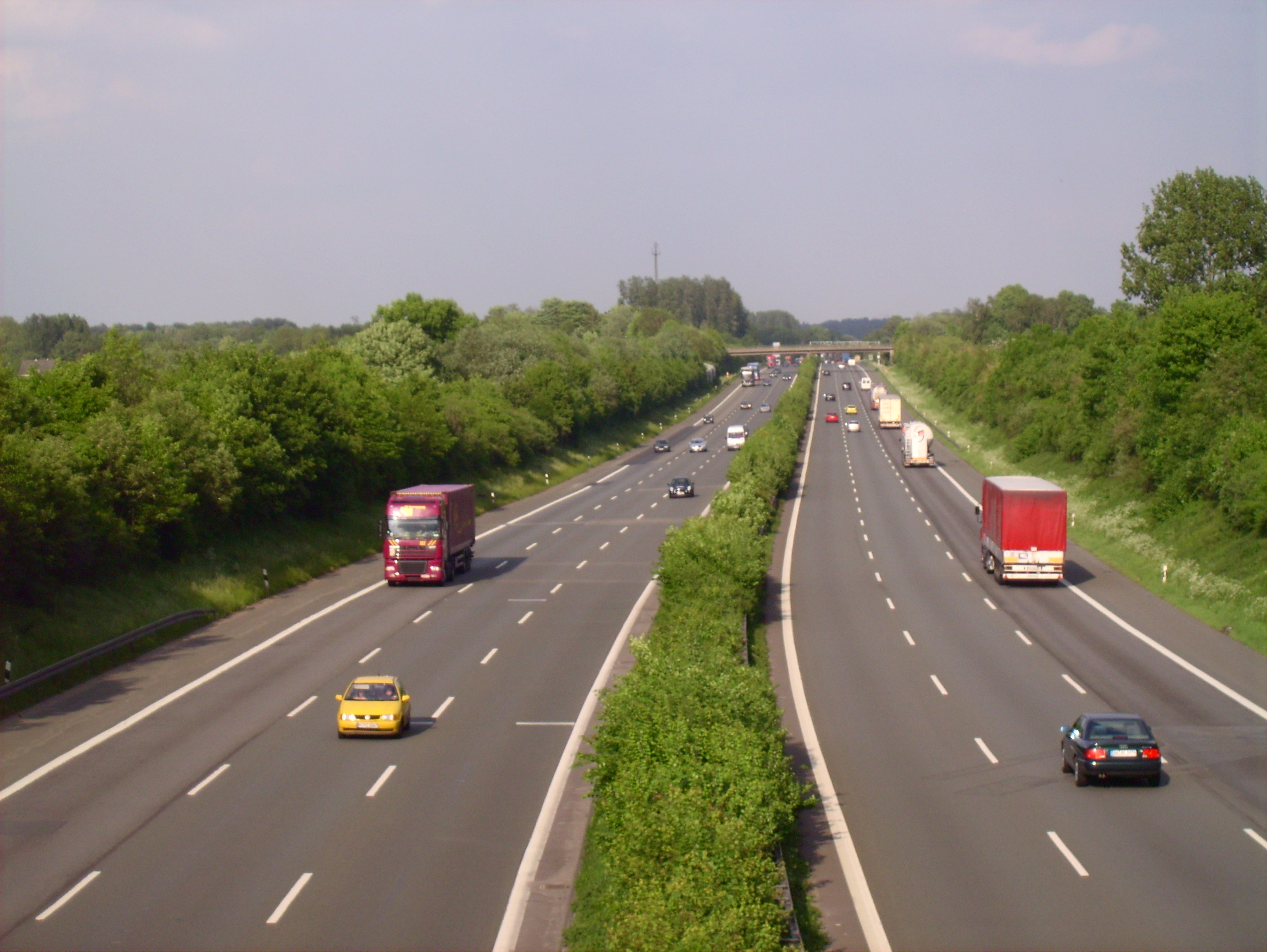
E34 near Kamen, looking east.

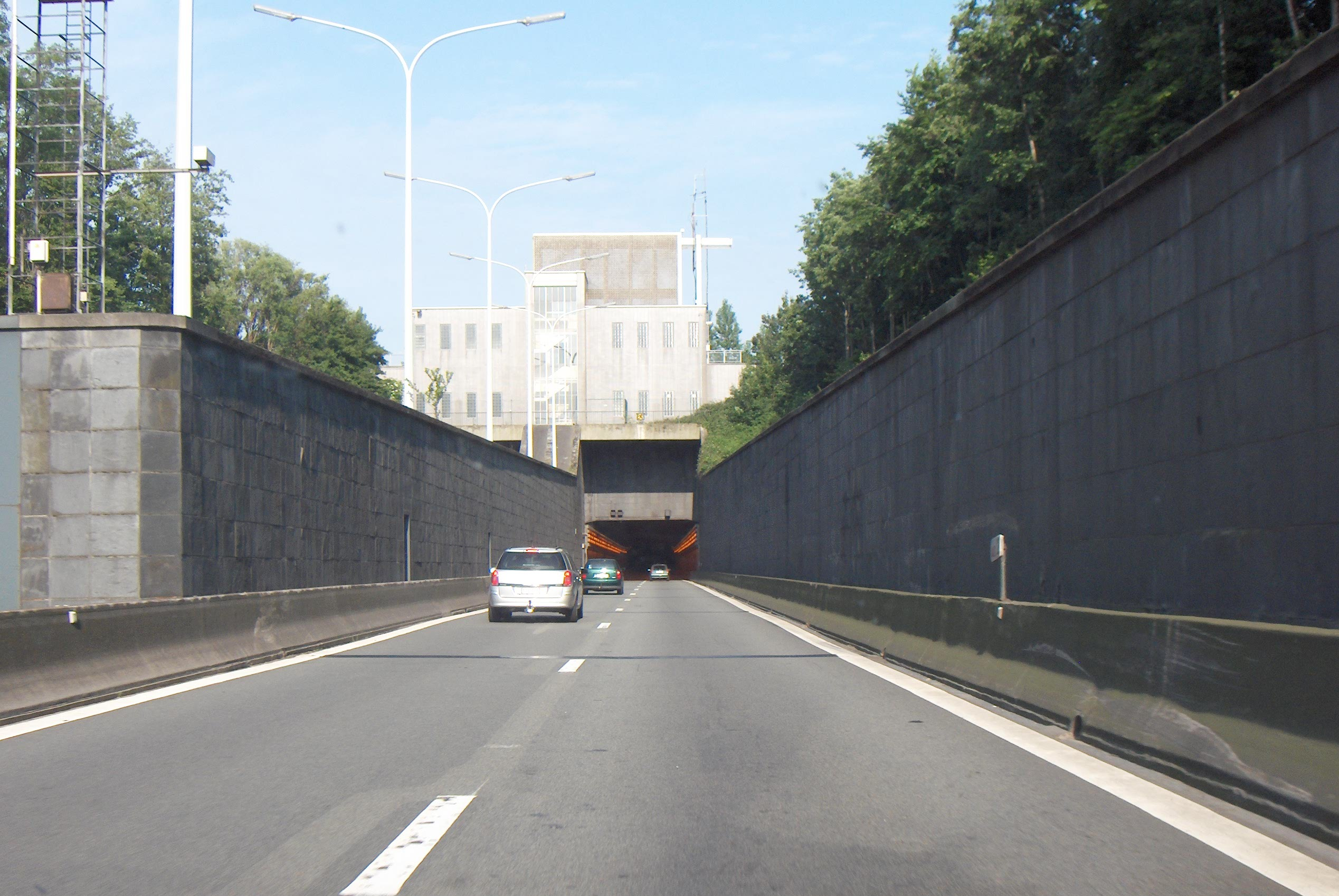
E34 tunnel under the canal that connects Ghent with the Western Scheldt.

== History and name ==
By the early 1990s, the western portion of the route, between Antwerp and the coast, was a dual carriageway with frequent intersections, the more busy of which were controlled by traffic lights and marked by 90 kilometres per hour (56 mph) speed limits. Starting at the Antwerp end, this part of the E34 has more recently been progressively upgraded with junctions either eliminated or else replaced by motorway-style intersections. The road is still of sub-motorway quality between the coast and Zelzate, but to the east of the road tunnel under the Ghent–Terneuzen Canal, the upgrade is virtually complete. The upgrade from National road to Autoroute quality has been reflected in a name change, from N49 to A11: in terms of national road numbers, as long as the upgrade remains incomplete, the two names are currently used interchangeably or together (N49-A11) when referring to the full length between Antwerp and Zeebrugge. In Belgium the E route numbers are given prominence at least equal to nationally assigned road numbers, so that in practice the road may be marked, using all three names, as the N49-E34-A11. Locally the road is often referred to more simply as the expressway (de expresweg).

In 2014 a wildlife crossing named Kempengrens was realised over the E34 at the Belgian/Dutch border at Postel.

== Congestion ==
The route skirts Antwerp using the southern R1 inner ring road which includes the Kennedy Tunnel: this is closed to vehicles with certain classes of dangerous loads. These are required to divert onto the northern R2 outer ring road. To address the resulting delays, and because the inner southern ring route itself frequently becomes seriously congested, a northern inner ring road for Antwerp is being planned.

The German portion of the E34 passes across the northern side of Germany's Ruhr industrial belt. Most of the road, which is currently being progressively upgraded, is now a six lane (three in each direction) highway. Access points are relatively close together in this section and the route - especially the section between Duisburg and Dortmund - is prone to delays resulting from traffic congestion.

== Route ==
E34 Zeebrugge - Bad Oeynhausen
State	National; Road; Number	Section	Junction (national numbering)
......Province			
West Flanders East Flanders	N49 (A11)	Zeebrugge - Zelzate	N49 (A11) 14 Zelzate; N49 (A11) Ghent–Terneuzen Canal; N49 (A11) 13 Zelzate
East Flanders Antwerp	A11 (N49)	Zelzate - Antwerp	A11 (N49) 12 Moerbeke; A11 (N49) 11 Kemzeke; A11 (N49) 10 Vrasene; A11 (N49) Beveren; A11 (N49) 9 Melsele; A11 (N49) 8 Waaslandhaven east A11 (N49) 7 Sint-Anna Linkeroever (Left Bank)
Antwerp	R1	Antwerp Southern Ringway	R1 E17 Antwerp west R1 6 Linkeroever (Left Bank); R1 Kennedy Tunnel (Scheldt River); R1 5a South; R1 Antwerp centre R1 E19 Antwerp south R1 5 Le Grellelaan; R1 4 Berchem; R1 3 Borgerhout; R1 E19 E313 Antwerp east
Antwerp	A13	Antwerp east - Ranst	A 13 18 Wommelgem; A 13 Ranst; A 13 E313 Ranst
Antwerp	A21	Ranst - Retie	A 21 19 Oelegem; A 21 20 Zoersel; A 21 21 Lille; A 21 22 Beerse; A 21 Gierle; A 21 23 Turnhout west A 21 24 Turnhout centre A 21 25 Oud-Turnhout; A 21 26 Retie
......Province			
North Brabant Limburg	A67	Hapert - Venlo	A 67 29 Hapert; A 67 30 Eersel; A 67 31 Veldhoven-West (Planned); A 67 E25 De Hogt; A 67 32a High Tech Campus (Philips Research); A 67 33 Waalre; A 67 E25 Leenderheide; A 67 34 Geldrop; A 67 35 Someren; A 67 36 Asten; A 67 37 Liessel; A 67 38 Helden; A 67 39 Venlo; A 67 Zaarderheiken; A 67 40 Velden; A 67 41 Venlo (A 61 - German)
Land/District			
KLE WES DU	A 40	Venlo - Duisburg	A 40 2 Straelen; A 40 3 Wankum; A 40 4 Wachtendonk; A 40 5 Kempen; A 40 6 Kerken; A 40 Neufelder Heide; A 40 7 Neukirchen-Vluyn; A 40 8 Moers E31; A 40 9 Moers centre A 40 10 Duisburg-Rheinhausen; A 40 11 Duisburg-Homberg; A 40 12 Duisburg Hafen (Port); A 40 13 Duisburg; A 40 14 / A 3 14 Kaiserberg E35
OB	A 3	Duisburg - Oberhausen	A 3 13 Oberhausen-Lirich E35; A 3 12 Oberhausen west A 3 11 Oberhausen-Holten; A 3 10 / A 2 1 Oberhausen E35
OB BOT RE DO UN HAM WAF GT BI LIP HF MI	A 2	Oberhausen - Bad Oeynhausen	A 2 2 Oberhausen-Königshardt; A 2 A 2 3 Bottrop; A 2 4 Gladbeck - Ellinghorst; A 2 5 Essen & Gladbeck; A 2 6 Gelsenkirchen - Buer; A 2 A 2 7 Herten; A 2 8 Recklinghausen; A 2 9 Recklinghausen south A 2 10 Recklinghausen east A 2 11 Henrichenburg; A 2 12 Dortmund North-west; A 2 12 Dortmund-Mengede; A 2 13 Dortmund North-east; A 2 14 Dortmund-Lanstrop; A 2 15 Kamen; A 2 16 Kamen E37; A 2 17 Bönen; A 2 18 Hamm; A 2 A 2 19 Hamm-Uentrop; A 2 20 Beckum; A 2 21 Oelde; A 2 22 Junction closed A 2 23 Rheda-Wiedenbrück; A 2 A 2 24 Gütersloh; A 2 25 Bielefeld; A 2 26 Bielefeld - Sennestadt; A 2 27 Bielefeld centre A 2 28 Ostwestfalen / Lippe; A 2 29 Herford / Bad Salzuflen; A 2 A 2 30 Herford east A 2 31 Vlotho - Exter; A 2 32 Bad Oeynhausen E30
