= Hintham =

Coordinates: 51°42′N 5°21′E

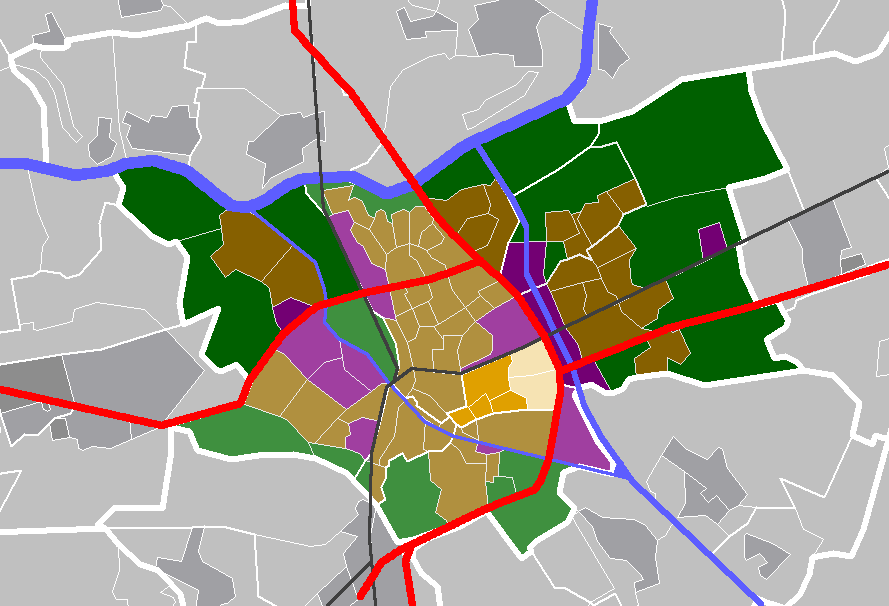
- Country: Netherlands
- Province: North Brabant
- Municipality: 's-Hertogenbosch

Population
  - Total: 5,910

Hintham is a village west of Rosmalen in the 's-Hertogenbosch municipality of North Brabant province. Hintham is known for the Interchange Hintham, an interchange in the A2 motorway, the highway from Amsterdam to Maastricht.
