= Ger Koopmans =

Dutch politician

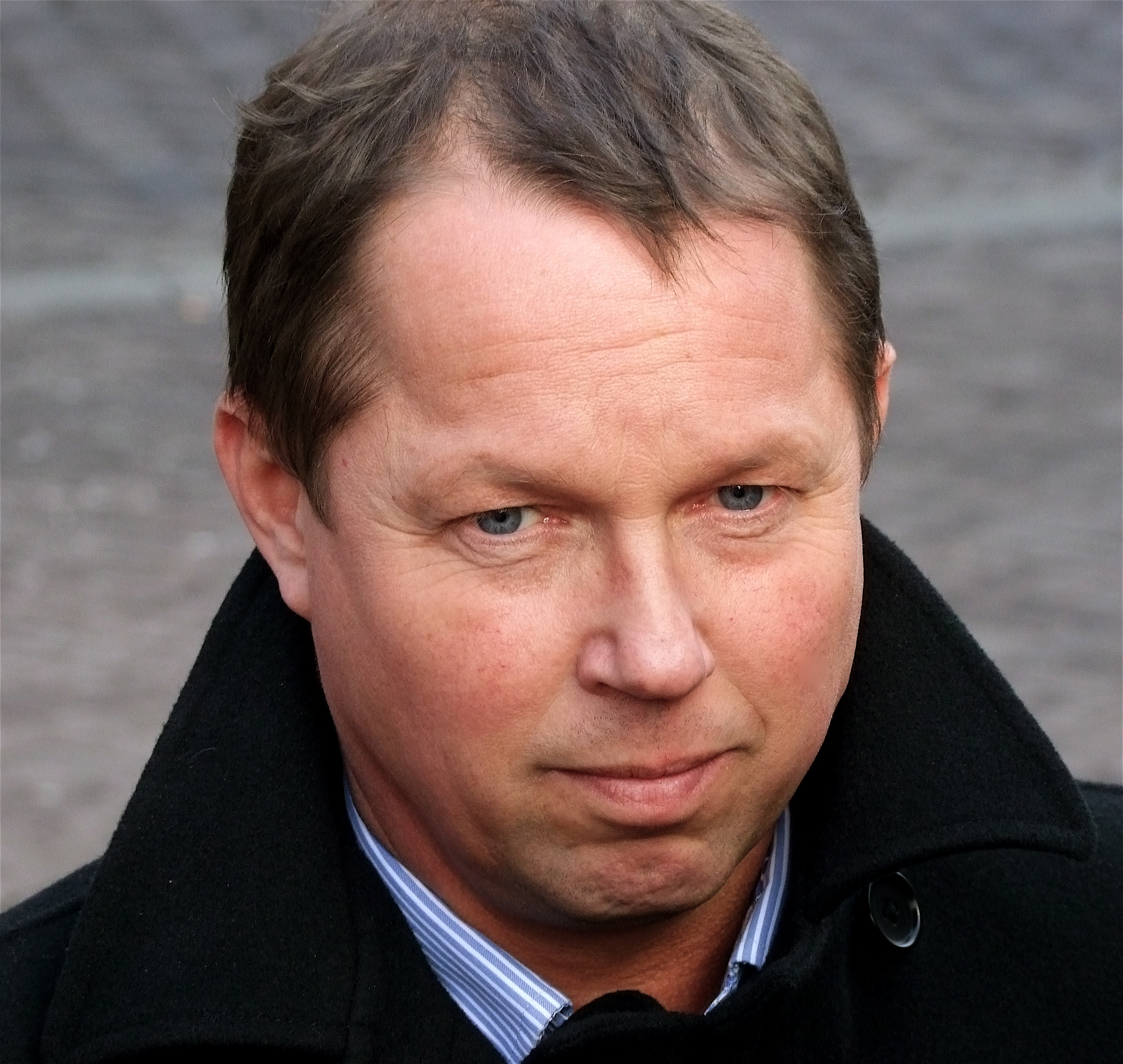
- Koopmans in 2010

Member of the House of Representatives
- In office 23 May 2002 – 19 September 2012

Personal details
- Born: Gerardus Peter Jan Koopmans; 14 August 1962 (age 63) Velden, Netherlands
- Party: Christian Democratic Appeal
- Occupation: Politician

Gerardus Peter Jan (Ger) Koopmans (born 14 August 1962 in Velden) is a former Dutch politician. A member of the Christian Democratic Appeal (Christen-Democratisch Appèl), he was an MP from 23 May 2002 to 19 September 2012. He focused on matters of agriculture, conservation, food safety and governmental organization.

He served as chairman of the National Board of Scouting Nederland from 2006 until 2011, and he became chairman of the Netherlands Agricultural and Horticultural Association (LTO Nederland) in March 2024.

== Decorations ==
- In 2012, he was awarded Knight of the Order of Orange-Nassau.
