= Martijn Oostra =

Dutch graphic designer and photographer

(Diederick) Martijn Oostra (born 12 November 1971, Waalre) is a Dutch graphic designer, photographer, artist and publicist. Oostra lives in Amsterdam, Netherlands. He studied at the Arnhem Institute for the Arts.
