= John Baselmans =

Dutch artist

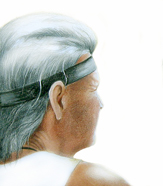
- Born: May 20, 1954 (age 72); Aalst/Waalre, Netherlands
- Education: Graphic school, Eindhoven
- Occupation: Artist/Writer
- Children: 2

John Baselmans (born May 20, 1954 in Waalre, North Brabant) is a Dutch artist, sculptor, graphic designer, and illustrator.

== Life and career ==
He was born in Aalst but has lived and worked in Curaçao, Netherlands Antilles since 1982. Since 1984, Baselmans has designed postal stamps for the post office of the Netherlands Antilles and has worked as an illustrator for different schoolbooks. His pen drawings are made in a combination of pen and ink, color pencils, and soft pastel chalk.

Baselmans started to draw at the age of three. His father taught him woodcarving, working with clay, painting, and other techniques which he still uses. He attended the Graphic School (University) and The Free Academy in Eindhoven in the Netherlands. Afterwards, he attended several drawing courses such as airbrush and architectural rendering in the United States. More recently, he has organized exhibitions in several countries, and has written several e-books.

== Exhibitions ==
- 1972 Kabbendans - Eindhoven, Netherlands
- 1972 Abbenhuis - Eindhoven, Netherlands
- 1973 Kabbendans - Eindhoven, Netherlands
- 1974 Kabbendans - Eindhoven, Netherlands
- 1977 Unilever - Duiven, Netherlands
- 1980 Huis in 't Park - Eindhoven, Netherlands
- 1981 Piazza center - Eindhoven, Netherlands
- 1981 Stadhuis zaal - Eindhoven, Netherlands
- 1981 Stadhuis - Gouda, Netherlands
- 1981 De Tempel - Curaçao, Netherlands Antilles
- 1982 Centro Bolivar Y Bello - Curaçao, Netherlands Antilles
- 1983 Taverne - Curaçao, Netherlands Antilles
- 1983 Assencion - Curaçao, Netherlands Antilles
- 1984 Curacaosche museum - Curaçao, Netherlands Antilles
- 1984 Sentro Pro arte - Curaçao, Netherlands Antilles
- 1985 Curacaosche museum - Curaçao, Netherlands Antilles
- 1986 Zeelandia - Curaçao, Netherlands Antilles
- 1988 Seaquarium - Curaçao, Netherlands Antilles
- 1989 Gallery ABN - Aruba - Netherlands Antilles
- 1989 Gallery Artishock - Aruba - Netherlands Antilles
- 1990 Graphic Art Gallery - Curaçao, Netherlands Antilles
- 2003 Villa Maria - Curaçao, Netherlands Antilles
- 2004 Gallery 86 - Curaçao, Netherlands Antilles

== Stamp design ==
-Baselmans designed about 200 stamps for the Postal Service of the Netherlands Antilles Catalog; Postzegels van Nederlandse & Overzeese rijksdelen NRS. FDC Se:

- 168
- 184
- 198
- 188
- 190
- 181
- 199
- 199a
- 212
- 213
- 213a
- 217
- 217a
- 219
- 223
- 224b
- 224a
- 229b
- 229a
- 231
- 232
- 235a
- 235b
- 237
- 238
- 242
- 246
- 247
- 250
- 252
- 257
- 257a
- 260
- 263
- 267
- 274
- 274a
- 276
- 281
- 282
- 288
- 296
- 297
- 301
- 306a
- 306b
- 308
- 313a
- 313
- 321
- 323
- 363
- 363a
- 365
- 367a
- 367
- 373
- 377a
- 377
- 378
- 380
- 403
- 405a
- 405b
- 422

== Books written by John Baselmans ==
Publisher LoBa LoBa productions

- Onze Cultuur ISBN 978-1-4475-2701-5
- Makamba ISBN 978-1-4461-3036-0
- Mañan-Morgen ISBN 978-1-4092-8949-4
- De wijsheden van onze oudjes ISBN 978-1-4092-9516-7
- Hé oudje, leef je nog? ISBN 978-1-4092-8482-6
- Eiland-je bewoner Bundel ISBN 978-0-557-01281-7
- Eiland-je bewoner Deel 2 ISBN 978-0-557-00613-7
- Eiland-je bewoner Deel 1 ISBN 978-1-4092-1856-2
- Eiland-je bewoner ISBN 978-1-4092-2102-9
- Curacao achter gesloten deuren ISBN 978-1-304-58901-9
- De matrix van het systeem Deel 1 ISBN 978-1-291-88840-9
- De matrix van het systeem Deel 2 ISBN 978-1-291-88841-6
- The hidden world part 1 ISBN 978-1-326-03644-7
- The hidden world part 2 ISBN 978-1-326-03645-4
- Geloof en het geloven ISBN 978-1-326-28453-4
- Dieptepunt ISBN 978-1-326-71278-5
- Namen/Names ISBN 978-1-326-81898-2
- Drugs ISBN 978-1-326-84325-0
- De protocollen van Sion 21ste eeuw ISBN 978-0-244-61655-7
- Verboden publicaties ISBN 978-0-244-91960-3
- De maatschappelijke beerput ISBN 978-0-244-36559-2
- Achter de sociale mediaschermen ISBN 978-0-244-14015-1
- Project Corona/COVID-19 ISBN 978-1-71664-848-9
- De Missende link ISBN 978-1-4710-9498-9
- Curatele ISBN 978-1-4717-9319-6
- Curaçao maffia eiland ISBN 978-1-4478-9049-2
- Zwartboek van Curaçao ISBN 978-1-4461-8058-7
- Mi bida no bal niun sèn ISBN 978-1-4467-2954-0
- Pech gehad ISBN 978-1-4457-6170-1
- Geboren voor één cent ISBN 978-1-4452-6787-6
- Help de Antillen verzuipen ISBN 978-1-4092-7972-3
- Moderne slavernij in het systeem ISBN 978-1-4092-5909-1
- Ingezonden ISBN 978-1-4092-1936-1
- Lifework Deluxe Edition 1 ISBN none
- Lifework Deluxe Edition 2 ISBN none
- John Baselmans’ Lifework (Part 1) ISBN 978-1-4092-8941-8
- John Baselmans’ Lifework (Part 2) ISBN 978-1-4092-8959-3
- John Baselmans’ Lifework (Part 3) ISBN 978-1-4092-8974-6
- John Baselmans’ Lifework (Part 4) ISBN 978-1-4092-8937-1
- Leren tekenen met gevoel ISBN 978-1-4092-7859-7
- Drawing humans in black and white ISBN 978-1-4092-5186-6
- The world of drawing humans ISBN 978-0-557-02754-5
- John Baselmans Drawing Course ISBN 978-0-557-01154-4
- The secret behind my drawings ISBN 978-0-557-01156-8
- Levenscirkel (Uit de cyclus van het energieniale leven) ISBN 978-1-300-76189-1
- Utopia (Uit de cyclus van het energieniale leven) ISBN 978-1-329-51188-0
- Vrijheid en liefde (Uit de cyclus van het energieniale leven) ISBN 978-1-329-79390-3
- Dimensies (Uit de cyclus van het energieniale leven) ISBN 978-1-365-87087-3
- Hologram (Uit de cyclus van het energieniale leven) ISBN 978-1-387-72155-9
- Het lang verborgen geheim (Uit de cyclus van het energieniale leven) ISBN 978-0-359-70533-7
- Zelfgenezing (Uit de cyclus van het energieniale leven) ISBN 978-1-4709-3332-6
- Dood is dood (Uit de cyclus van het energieniale leven) ISBN 978-1-4476-7213-5
- Het energieniale leven ISBN 978-1-4457-2953-4
- The world of positive energy ISBN 978-0-557-02542-8
- Words of wisdom (Part3) ISBN 978-1-4461-3035-3
- Words of wisdom (Part 2) ISBN 978-1-4452-6791-3
- Words of wisdom (Part 1) ISBN 978-1-4452-6789-0
- Words of wisdom (Part 4) ISBN 978-1-4710-8130-9
- NU deel 12 ISBN 978-1-4092-7661-6
- NU deel 11 ISBN 978-1-4092-7759-0
- NU deel 10 ISBN 978-1-4092-7708-8
- NU deel 9 ISBN 978-1-4092-7768-2
- NU deel 8 ISBN 978-1-4092-7738-5
- NU deel 7 ISBN 978-1-4092-7775-0
- NU deel 6 ISBN 978-1-4092-7742-2
- NU deel 5 ISBN 978-1-4092-7720-0
- NU deel 4 ISBN 978-1-4092-7787-3
- NU deel 3 ISBN 978-1-4092-7747-7
- NU deel 2 ISBN 978-1-4092-7736-1
- NU deel 1 ISBN 978-1-4092-7691-3
- Het dagboek van een eilandstek ISBN 978-0-359-85040-2
- Jonathan en Shalimar ISBN none
- Publications postal stamps 1984 till 2007, "Special catalog Postalstamps" ISBN 90-73646-00-6, Philately department Postal Netherlands Antilles, Director Mr. S.Paulina
