= A25 road (Belgium) =

Motorway in Belgium

A25
- Dutch: Autosnelweg 25; French: Autoroute 25
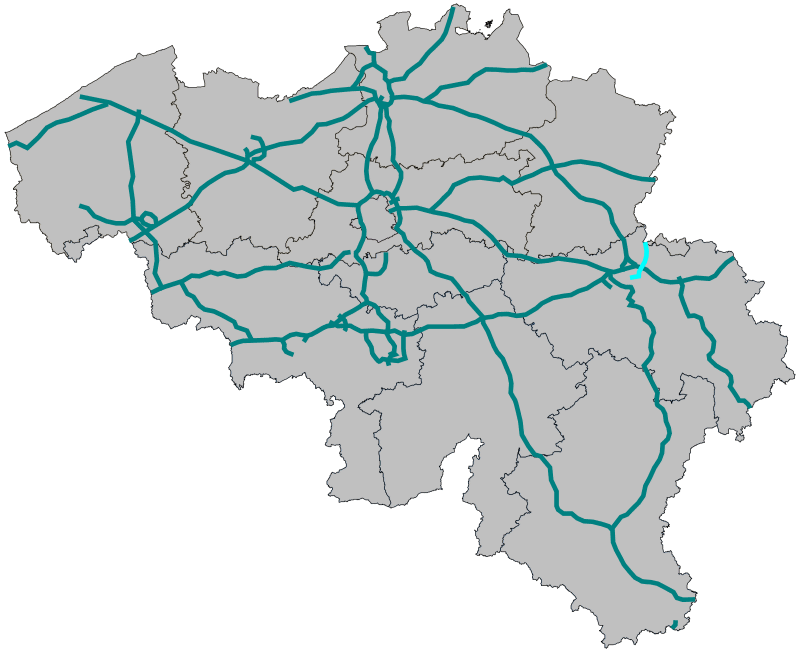
- Motorways in Belgium with A25 lighter.

Route information
- Part of E25
- Maintained by the Roads and Traffic Agency of the Flemish government and the Transport Agency of the Walloon government
- Length: 15 km (9.3 mi)

Major junctions
- North end: E25 / A 2 at the Netherlands border
- E25 / E40 / E42 / A3 near Liège
- South end: N90 / N610 in Liège

Location
- Country: Belgium
- Provinces: Limburg, Liège

Highway system
- Highways of Belgium; Motorways; National Roads
← A21	→ A26

The A25 road is a motorway in Belgium.

== Exit list ==
Province	Municipality	km	mi	Exit	Destinations	Notes
Limburg	Voeren			—	E25 / A 2	Border with the Netherlands; this road continues as the Dutch A2; north end of E 25 overlap
Limburg–Liège provincial line	Voeren–Visé municipal line			1	N602	
Liège	Visé			2	N653	
Liège	Visé			2a		Southbound entrance and northbound exit only
Liège	Visé			3	N653	
Liège	Visé			4	N653	
Liège	Visé–Liège municipal line			—	E25 / E40 / E42 / A3	South end of E 25 overlap
Liège	Liège			5	N667	
Liège	Liège			6		
Liège	Liège			7		
Liège	Liège			—	N90 / N610	This road continues south as the N610 southbound and the N90 northbound
1.000 mi = 1.609 km; 1.000 km = 0.621 mi: Concurrency terminus; Incomplete access
