= Arcen =

Arcen Árse (Limburgish)
- Town
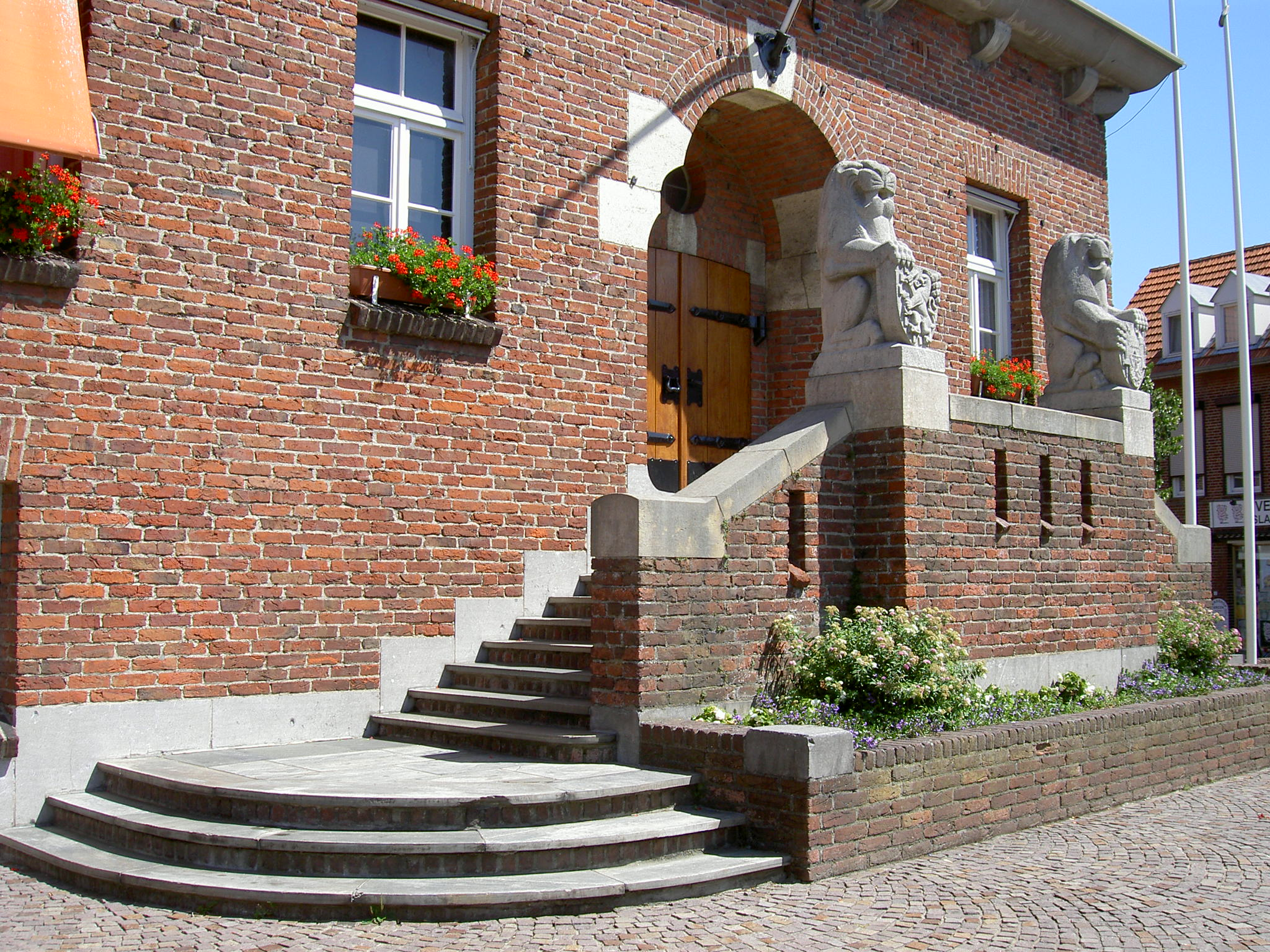
- Arcen: Gemeentehuis

- Flag
- Interactive map of Arcen
- Coordinates: 51°24′42″N 6°10′4″E
- Country: Netherlands
- Province: Limburg
- Municipality: Venlo

Area
  - Total: 11.47 km^{2} (4.43 sq mi)

Population (1 January 2026)
  - Total: 2,910
  - Density: 254/km^{2} (657/sq mi)
- Postal code: 5944
- Dialling code: 077

Arcen (Dutch: [ˈɑrsə(n)]; Limburgish: Árse) is a village in the Dutch province of Limburg. In 2010, it became part of the municipality of Venlo. Previously, it had been part of the municipality of Arcen en Velden and the seat of the town hall (gemeentehuis).

In 2001, Arcen had 1884 inhabitants. The built-up area of the town was 0.39 km^{2}, and contained 747 residences.

In December 2009, the last month before merging with the city of Venlo, the municipality of Arcen en Velden had 8671 inhabitants.

Its location on the river Maas (Meuse) makes it a popular tourist attraction. It is wedged in between Germany in the east and the river Maas in the west. National Park de Hamert lies just north of Arcen. Historic buildings include the 'Schanstoren' (Schans Tower) and the castle as well as century old houses in the village itself. The town hall is of a Traditionalist 20th century design by A.J. Kropholler while the church was designed in a similar style by H.W. Valk. Outside the centre are the Hertog Jan beer brewery and the 'De IJsvogel' distillery, which is located in a historic water mill and produces jenever (gin), bitters and liquors.

Near Arcen lies the only preserved fortress built to protect the Fossa Eugeniana, a canal built between 1625 and 1629 to connect the rivers Rhine and Maas.

Arcen has a thermal bath and various holiday parks.

Arcen's castle and its huge gardens (320,000 m^{2}) are a tourist hot spot for the entire region.

Arcen is the birthplace of former Dutch soccer international Stan Valckx.

== Gallery ==
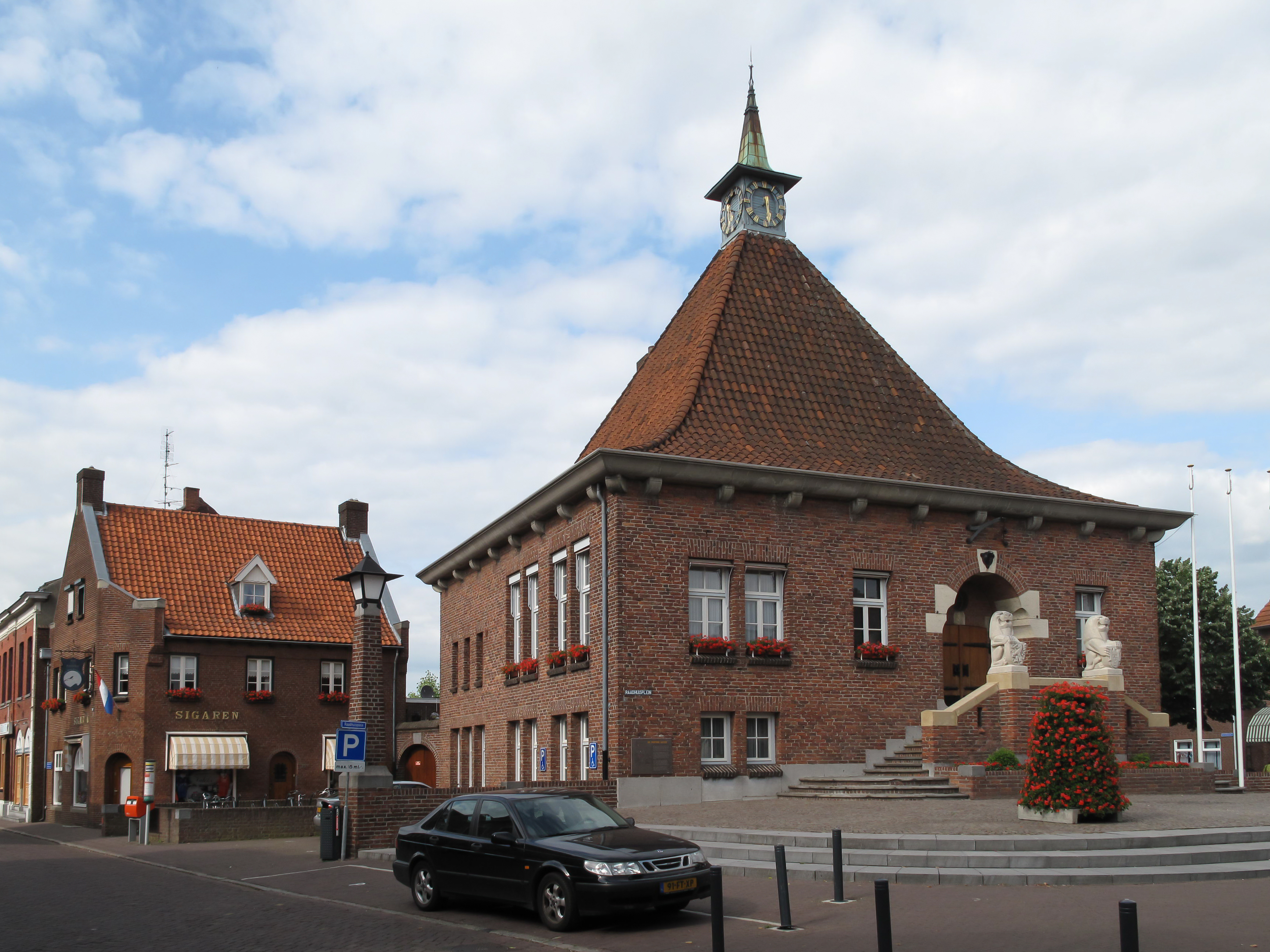
Arcen, former town hall

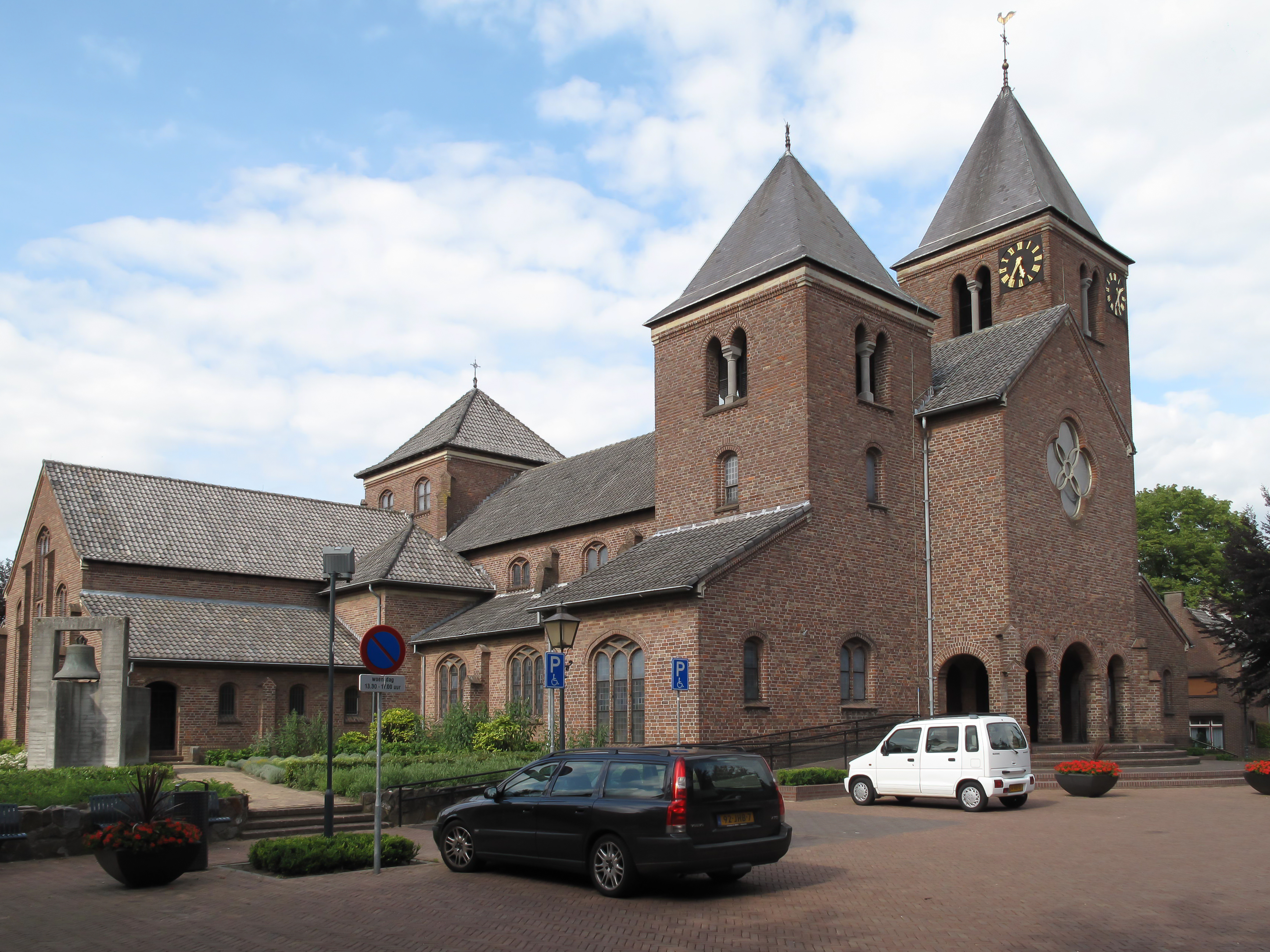
Arcen, church

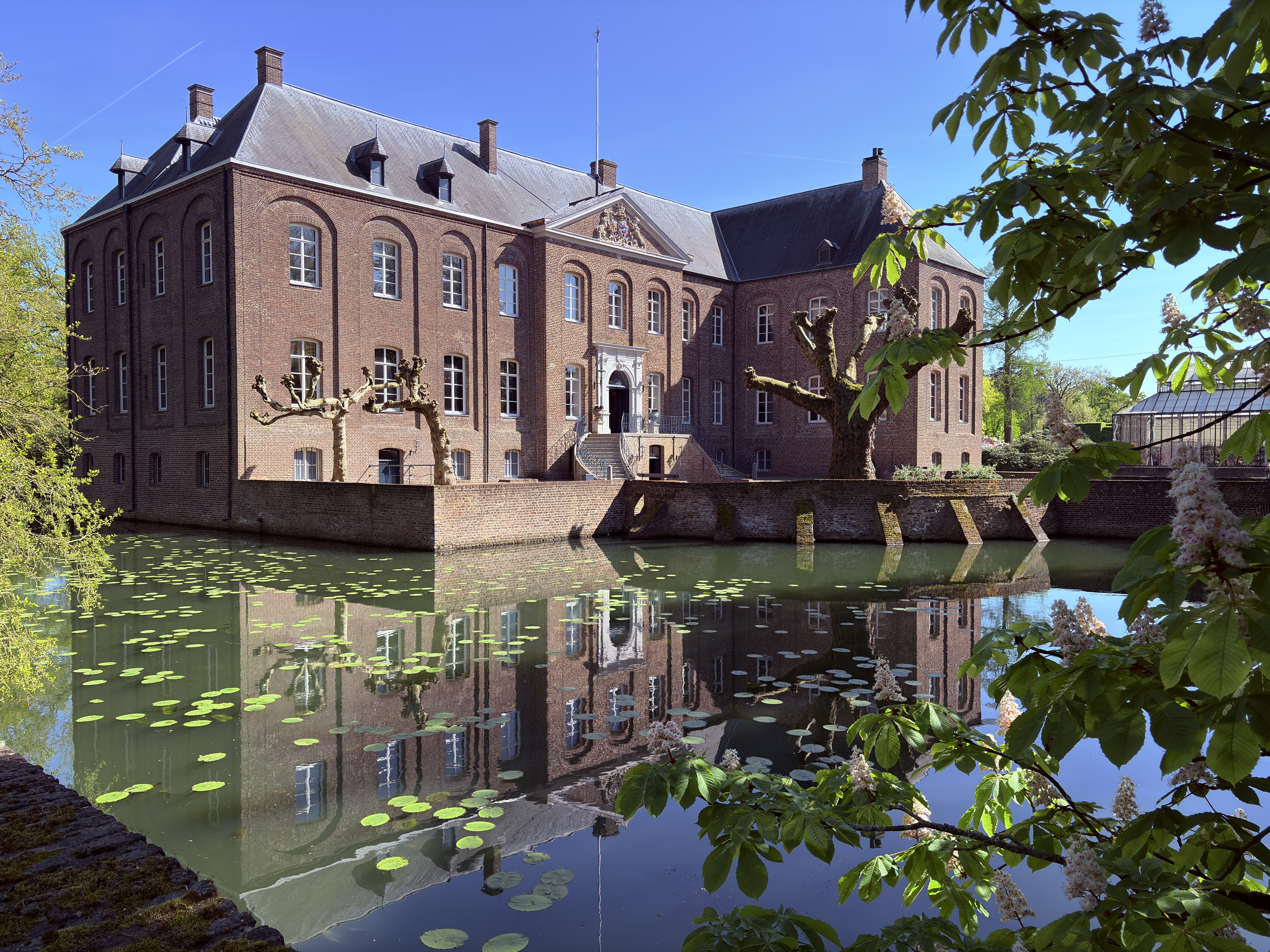
Arcen castle

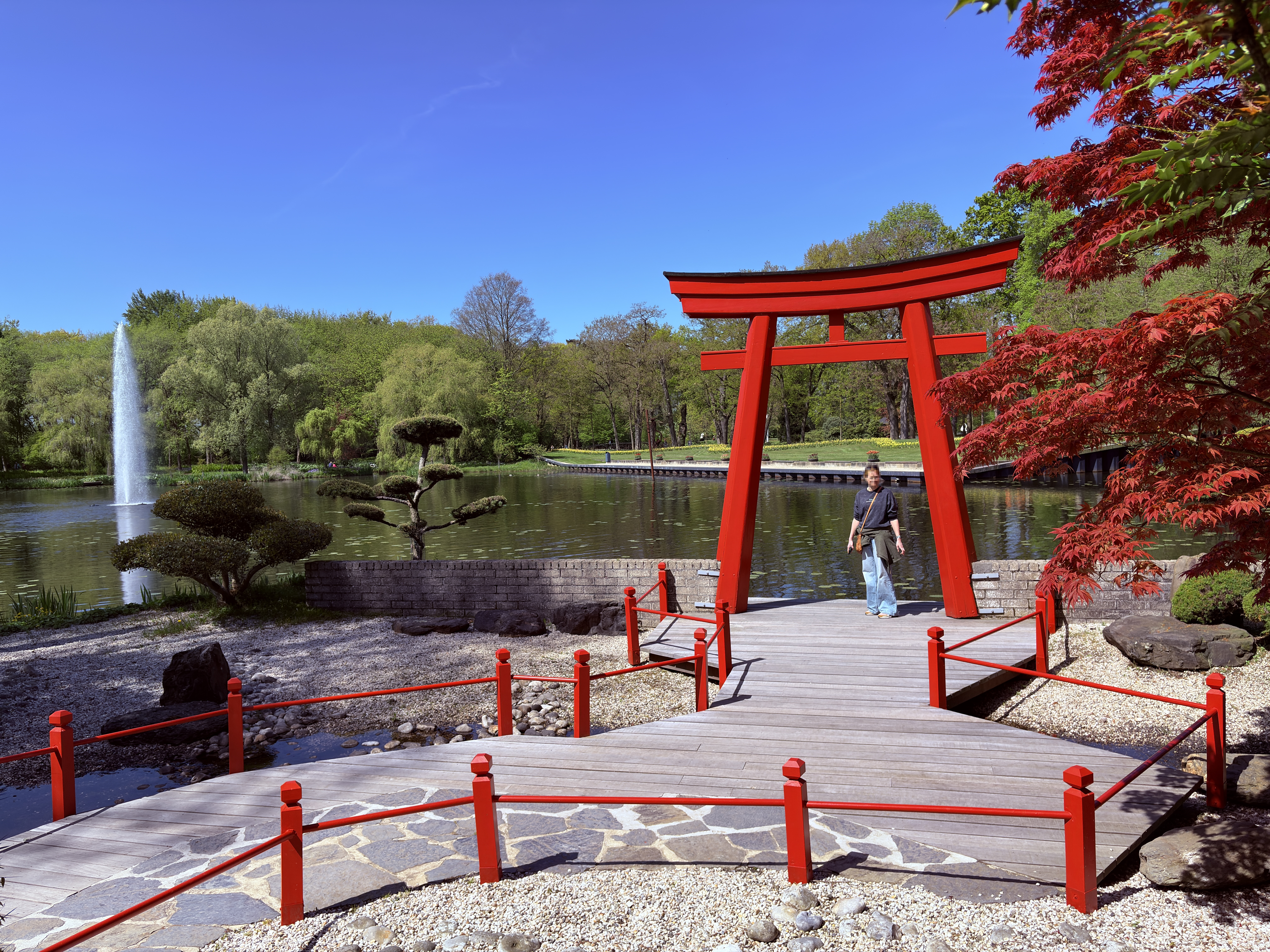
Castle gardens

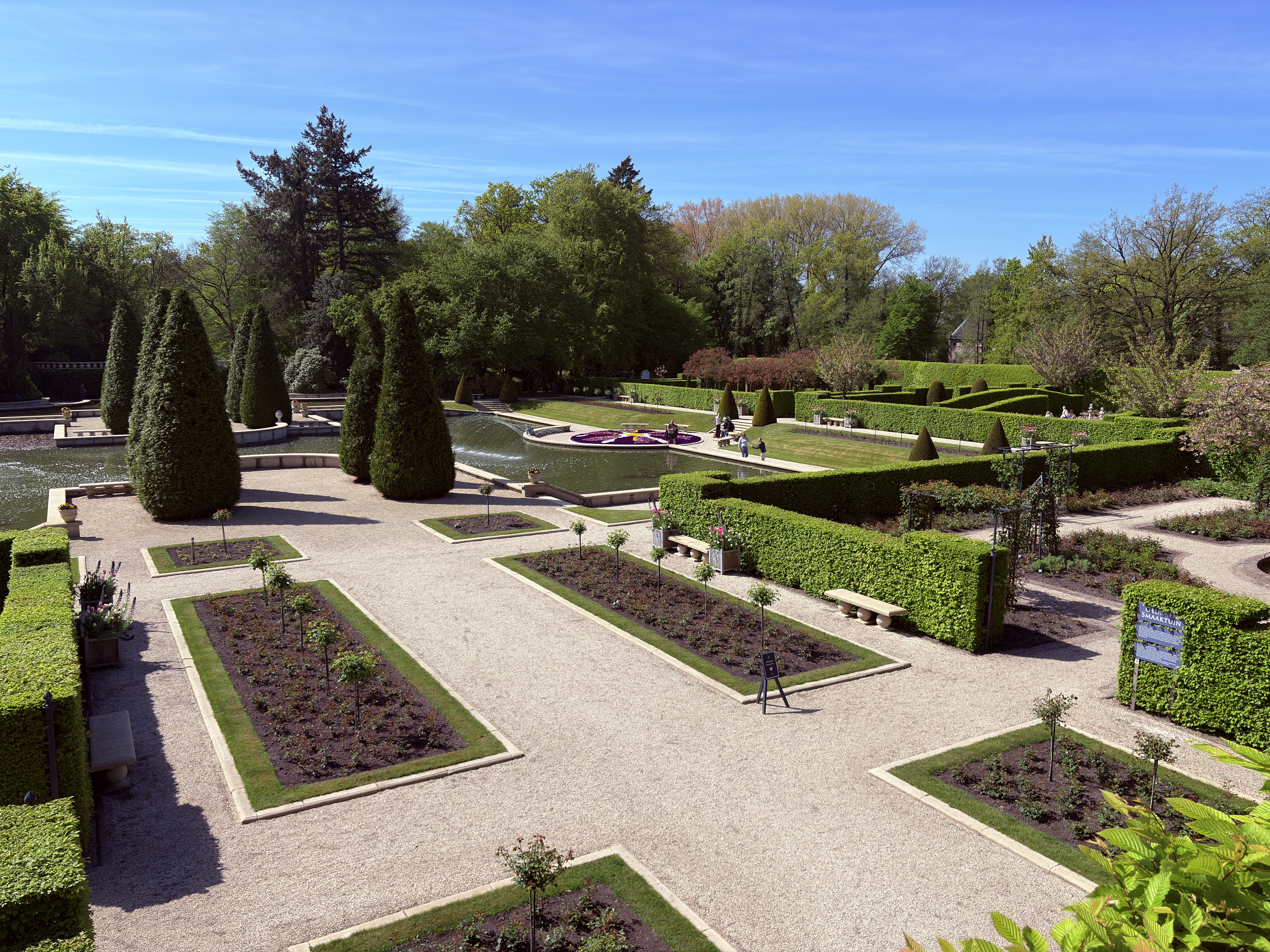
Castle gardens

== Climate ==
Climate data for Arcen (1991−2020 normals, extremes 1901−present)
Month	Jan	Feb	Mar	Apr	May	Jun	Jul	Aug	Sep	Oct	Nov	Dec	Year
Record high °C (°F)	15.9 (60.6)	20.5 (68.9)	26.1 (79.0)	28.9 (84.0)	33.2 (91.8)	36.1 (97.0)	40.2 (104.4)	37.8 (100.0)	33.6 (92.5)	27.3 (81.1)	20.4 (68.7)	15.8 (60.4)	40.2 (104.4)
Mean daily maximum °C (°F)	5.9 (42.6)	7.1 (44.8)	11.1 (52.0)	15.7 (60.3)	19.6 (67.3)	22.5 (72.5)	24.6 (76.3)	24.1 (75.4)	20.2 (68.4)	15.0 (59.0)	9.7 (49.5)	6.3 (43.3)	15.2 (59.4)
Daily mean °C (°F)	3.2 (37.8)	3.7 (38.7)	6.5 (43.7)	10.2 (50.4)	14.0 (57.2)	16.8 (62.2)	18.8 (65.8)	18.2 (64.8)	14.8 (58.6)	10.8 (51.4)	6.8 (44.2)	3.9 (39.0)	10.6 (51.1)
Mean daily minimum °C (°F)	0.4 (32.7)	0.4 (32.7)	2.1 (35.8)	4.4 (39.9)	8.1 (46.6)	10.9 (51.6)	13.1 (55.6)	12.6 (54.7)	9.9 (49.8)	6.9 (44.4)	3.6 (38.5)	1.3 (34.3)	6.1 (43.0)
Record low °C (°F)	−19.9 (−3.8)	−15.2 (4.6)	−10.0 (14.0)	−6.4 (20.5)	−1.1 (30.0)	0.6 (33.1)	3.9 (39.0)	2.7 (36.9)	0.2 (32.4)	−6.0 (21.2)	−8.8 (16.2)	−14.3 (6.3)	−19.9 (−3.8)
Average precipitation mm (inches)	62.8 (2.47)	57.5 (2.26)	50.4 (1.98)	40.7 (1.60)	54.6 (2.15)	60.3 (2.37)	71.9 (2.83)	76.8 (3.02)	60.2 (2.37)	63.6 (2.50)	62.9 (2.48)	71.7 (2.82)	733.4 (28.87)
Average relative humidity (%)	86.7	83.8	78.7	72.7	72.6	74.0	75.0	78.0	82.7	86.1	89.2	88.9	80.7
Mean monthly sunshine hours	65.8	88.4	140.2	181.0	207.0	203.0	205.2	190.4	154.5	119.0	71.8	54.2	1,680.5
Percentage possible sunshine	25.2	31.3	37.7	43.5	42.8	40.9	41.1	42.0	40.6	35.9	26.7	22.1	35.8
Source: Royal Netherlands Meteorological Institute
