= Bundesautobahn 40 =

Federal motorway in Germany

A 40
- Bundesautobahn 40
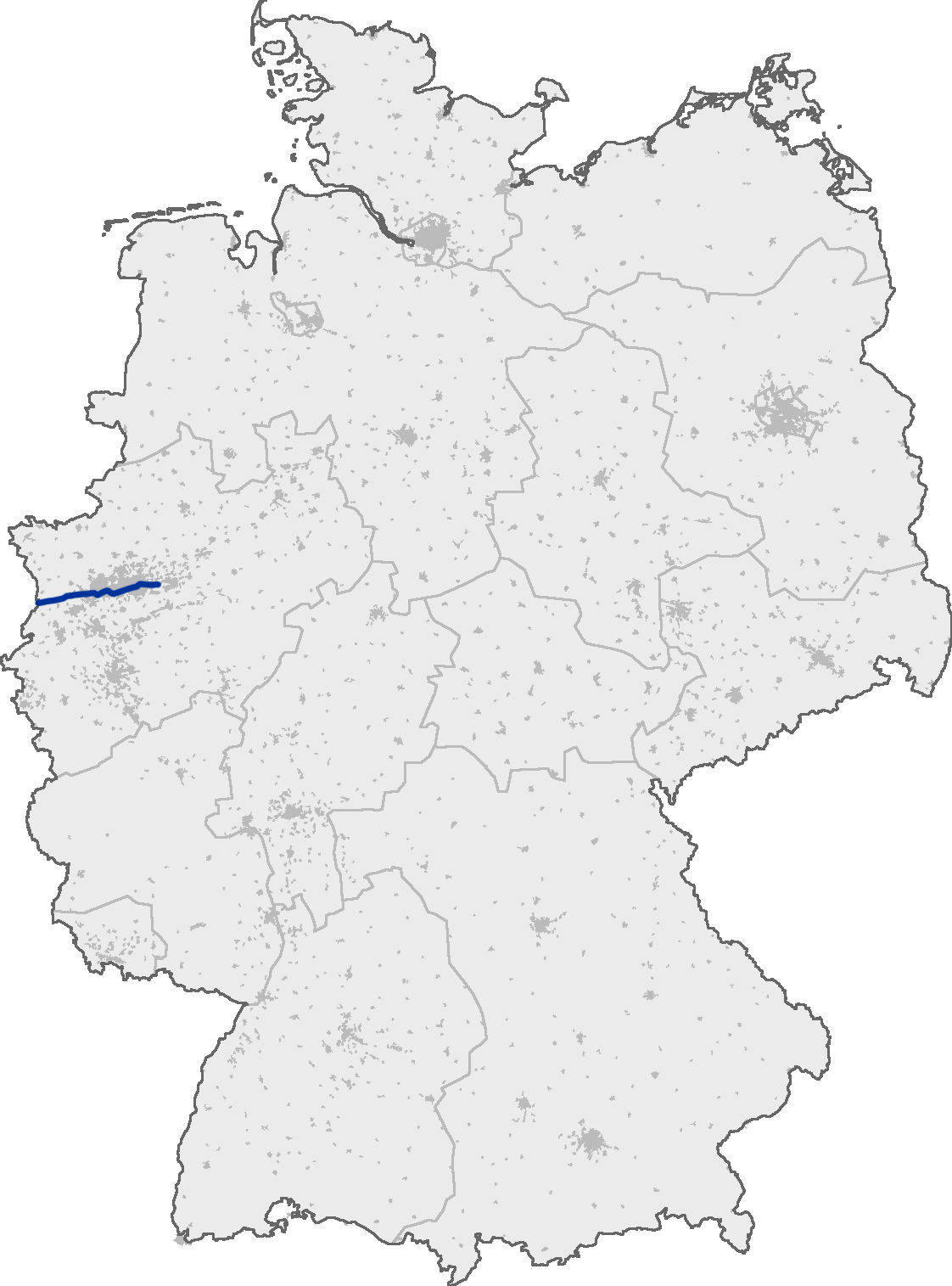

Route information
- Length: 94 km (58 mi)

Major junctions
- West end: Straelen A 67 border with Netherlands
- East end: B 1 in Dortmund

Location
- Country: Germany
- States: North Rhine-Westphalia

Highway system
- Roads in Germany; Autobahns; List; Federal; List; State; E-roads
← A 39	→ A 42

Bundesautobahn 40 (translates from German as Federal Motorway 40, short form Autobahn 40, abbreviated as BAB 40 or A 40), (named A 430 until the early 1990s) is one of the most used Autobahns in Germany. It crosses the Dutch-German border as a continuation of the Dutch A67 and crosses the Rhine, leads through the Ruhr valley toward Bochum, becoming B 1 (Bundesstraße 1) at the Kreuz Dortmund West and eventually merging into the A 44 near Holzwickede.

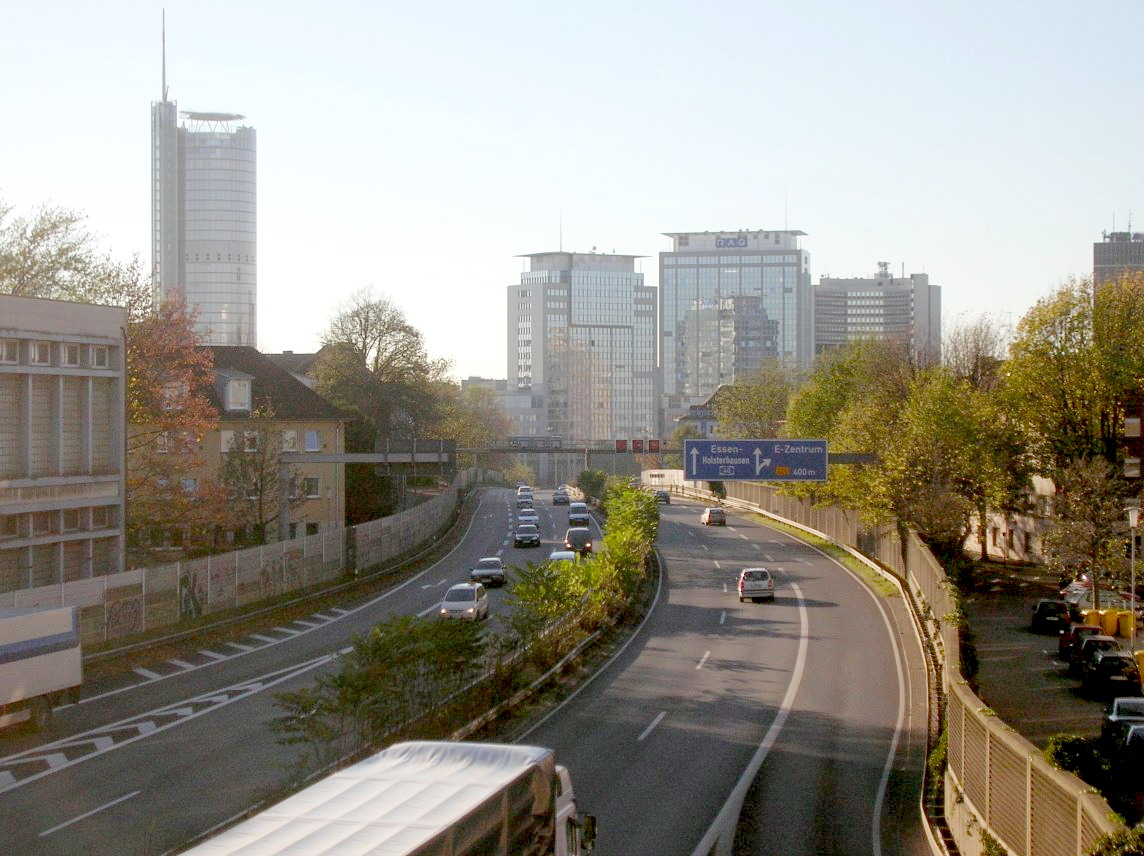
BAB 40 as Ruhrschnellweg in Essen

It has officially been named Ruhrschnellweg (Ruhr Fast Way), but locals usually call it Ruhrschleichweg (Ruhr Crawling Way) or "the Ruhr area's longest parking lot". According to Der Spiegel, it is the most congested motorway in Germany.

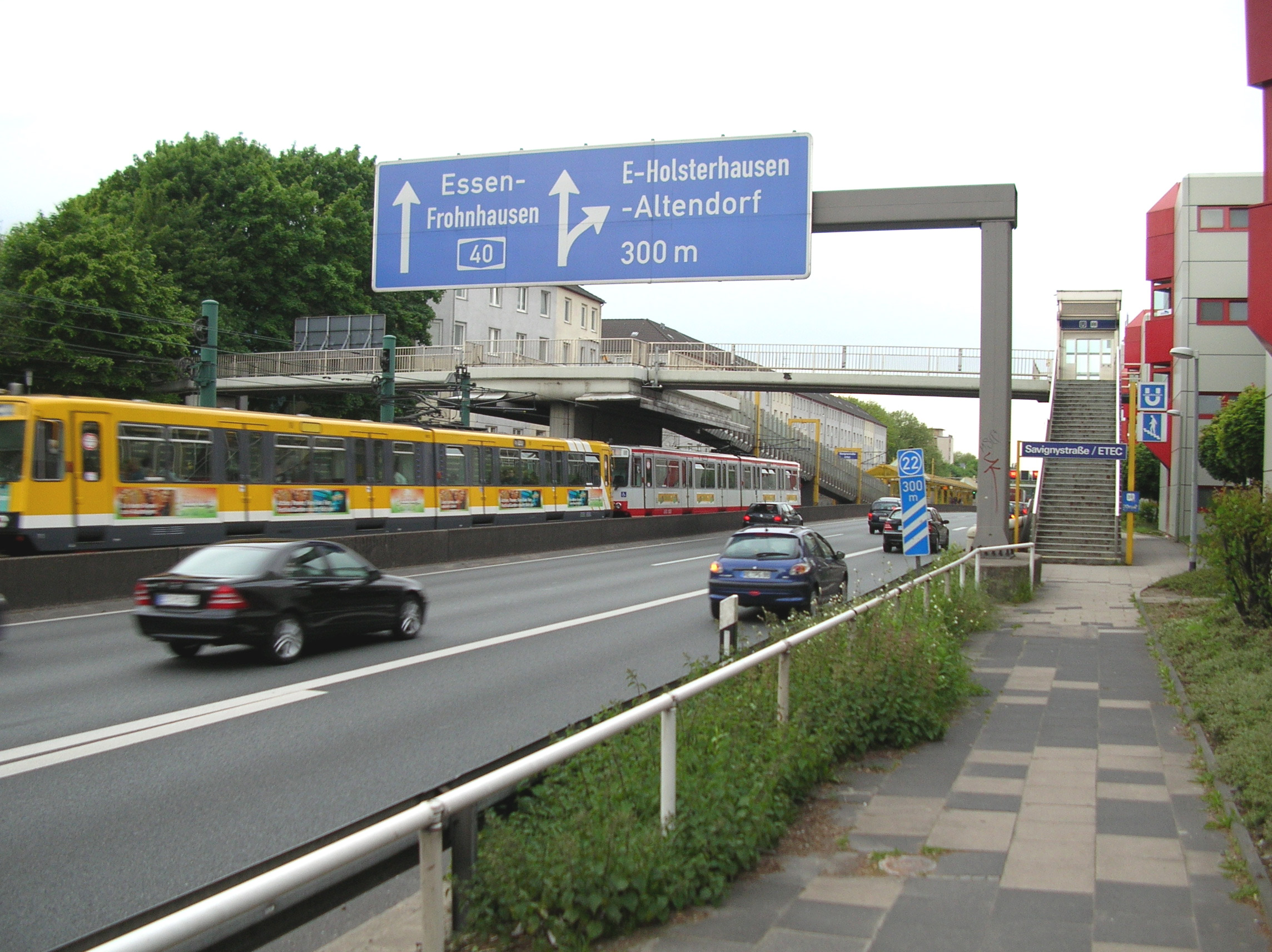
Stadtbahn stop Savignystraße, close to the Essen-Holsterhausen exit.

In the city of Essen, a Stadtbahn service operates on the median of the A 40 between Tunnel Ruhrschnellweg and Mülheim-Heißen. Between the Essen-Huttrop and the Essen-Kray junctions, there is a guided bus system called Spurbus.

== Exit list ==
Legend:

- I/C - Interchange, I/S - Intersection, RSA - Rest and service area, OBR - Overhead bridge restaurant, R/R - Restaurant and rest plaza, L/B - Layby, V/P - Vista point, TN - tunnel, T/P - Toll plaza, BR - Bridge
- C - Cloverleaf, S - Stack, T-A - Trumpet-A, T-B - Trumpet-B, DT - Directional-T/Y, SDT - Semi-Directional-T/Y, P-Y - Partial-Y, D - Diamond, P-C - Partial cloverleaf, D-D - Diverging diamond, D-R - Direct ramp

Location	km	mi	Exit	Name	Destinations	Notes
To be updated			Germany–Netherlands border Through to A 67 / E34			
To be updated			1	Straelen border crossing		
To be updated			Niederdorf Rest area			
To be updated			2	Straelen	B 221	
To be updated			3	Wankum		
To be updated			4	Wachtendonk		
To be updated			5	Kempen		
To be updated			6	Kerken	B 9	
To be updated			Neufelder Heide Services			
To be updated			7	Neukirchen-Vluyn		
To be updated			8	Moers	A 57 / E31	4-way interchange
To be updated			8	Moers		
To be updated			9	Moers-Zentrum		Eastbound
To be updated			10	Rheinhausen		
To be updated			11	Duisburg-Homberg		
To be updated			Neuenkamper Rheinbrücke			
To be updated			12/1	Duisburg-Häfen		
To be updated			12/2	Duisburg-Häfen		
To be updated			13	Duisburg	A 59	4-way interchange
To be updated			14	Kaiserberg	A 3 / E34 / E35	4-way interchange
To be updated				Ruhrbrücke		
To be updated			15	Mülheim an der Ruhr		
To be updated			16	Mülheim-Styrum	B 223	
To be updated			17	Mülheim-Dümpten		
To be updated			18	Mülheim-Winkhausen		
To be updated			Hardenbergbrücke (170 m)			
To be updated			19	Mülheim-Heißen	B 1	
To be updated			20	Mülheim-Heimaterde		
To be updated			21	Essen-Frohnhausen		
To be updated			22	Essen-Holsterhausen		
To be updated			23	Essen-Zentrum		
To be updated			Ruhrschnellweg Tunnel (1.005 m)			
To be updated			24	Essen-Huttrop	B 227	
To be updated			25	Essen-Ost	A 52	4-way interchange
To be updated			26	Essen-Frillendorf		
To be updated			27	Essen-Kray		
To be updated			28	Gelsenkirchen-Süd	B 227	
To be updated			29	Bochum-Wattenscheid-West		
To be updated			30	Bochum-Wattenscheid		
To be updated			31	Dückerweg		
To be updated			Dückerweg Filling station			
To be updated			32	Bochum-Stahlhausen		
To be updated			Wattenscheider Straße Filling station (westbound); Darpestraße Filling station (eastbound)			
To be updated			33	Bochum-Hamme	B 226	
To be updated			34	Freudenbergstraße		Eastbound
To be updated			35	Bochum-Zentrum	B 51	
To be updated			36	Bochum-Ruhrstadion		
To be updated			Grumme Tunnel (328/302 m)			
To be updated			37	Bochum-Harpen		
To be updated			38	Bochum	A 43	4-way interchange
To be updated			39	Bochum-Werne		
To be updated			40	Dortmund-Lütgendortmund	B 235	
To be updated			Rheinlanddamm Filling station			
To be updated			41	Dortmund-Kley		
To be updated			42	Dortmund-West	A 45; B 1	4-way interchange
To be updated			43	Dortmund-Dorstfeld		
To be updated			44	Dortmund-Barop		
To be updated			Schnettkerbrücke (328 m)			
To be updated				Dortmund Hombruch		Planned
To be updated				Dortmund Zentrum	B 54	Intersection (Planned)
To be updated			Filling station (Planned)			
To be updated				Dortmund	Märkische Straße	Planned
To be updated			Westtunnel Tunnel (500 m, planned)			
To be updated				Dortmund	Semerteichstraße	Planned
To be updated			Osttunnel Tunnel (1500 m, planned)			
To be updated			48	Dortmund-Ost	B 236	Interchange
To be updated			49	Dortmund-Stadtkrone Ost		
To be updated				Psychiatrische Einrichtungen	Marsbruchstraße	Westbound
To be updated			Stadtbahnlinie Level crossing			
To be updated			Filling station (westbound)			
To be updated				Dortmund-Aplerbeck	Leni-Rommel-Straße	Planned
To be updated			Straßenbrücke Neuasseln (60 m, planned)			
To be updated				Dortmund-Sölde	Köln-Berliner-Straße	Planned
To be updated			Filling station (eastbound)			
To be updated			51	Holzwickede	B 1 – Flughafen Dortmund Airport	
To be updated			Filling station (westbound)			
To be updated				Holzwickede-Ost		Planned
To be updated			Talbrücke Massener Bach (190 m)			
To be updated			Dortmund / Unna; A 44 / E331			
1.000 mi = 1.609 km; 1.000 km = 0.621 mi: Proposed; Route transition
