= Hintham Interchange =

Interchange in the Netherlands

Coordinates: 51°41′54.30″N 5°21′6.79″E

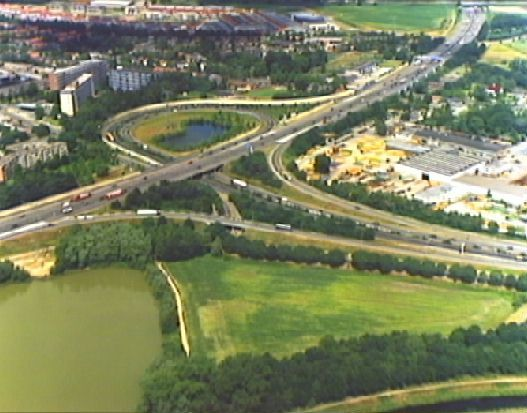
Interchange Hintham

Interchange Hintham (Dutch: Knooppunt Hintham) is a three-way interchange near Hintham, Netherlands. It is a stack interchange of the A2 motorway (E25) and the A59 motorway (N93). It was previously a trumpet interchange.
