= Wankum =

Coordinates: 51°24′N 6°18′E

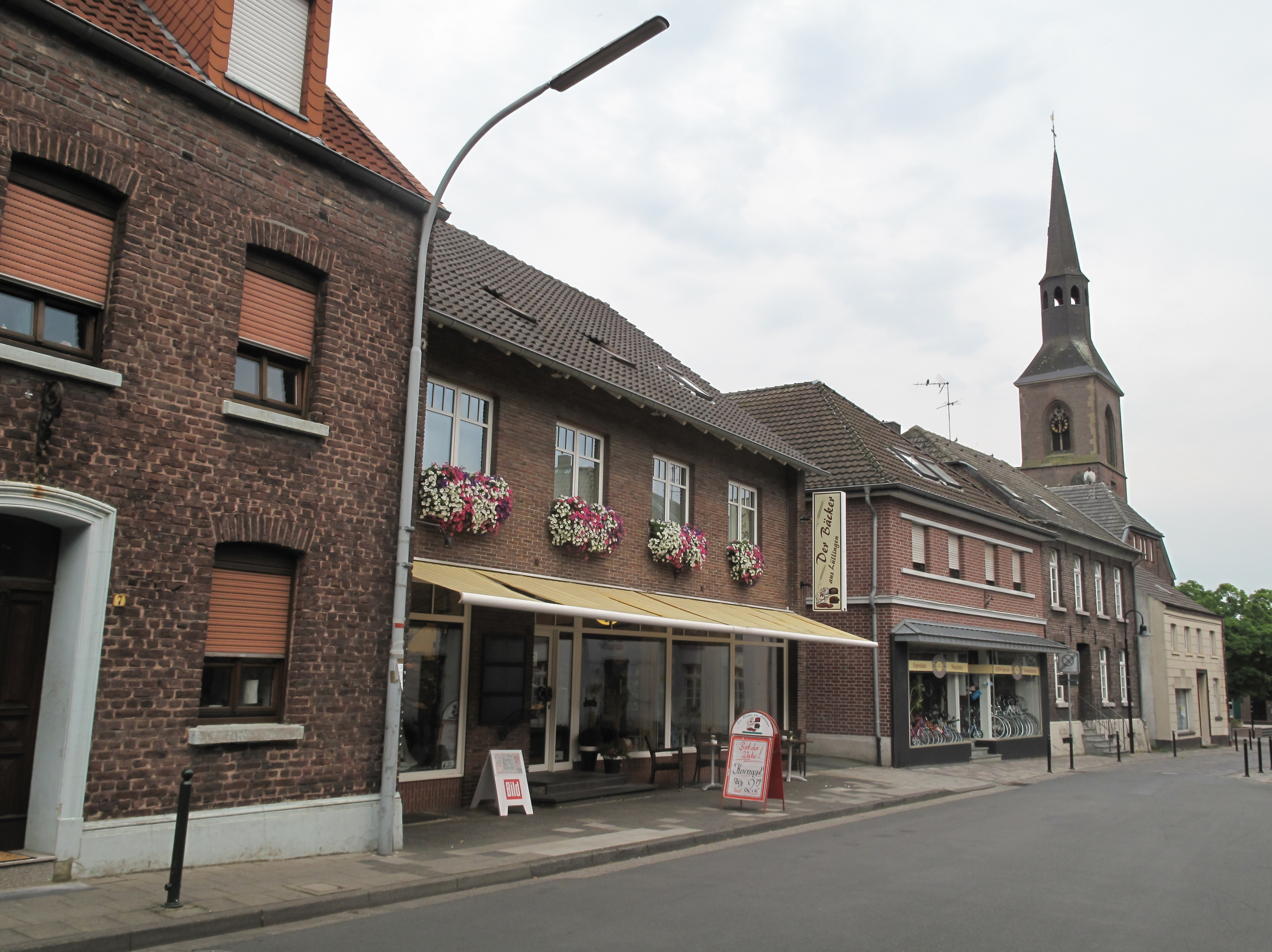
Street and church in Wankum

Wankum is a part of Wachtendonk in North Rhine-Westphalia, Germany.

Its location, near the A40 autobahn close to the border with The Netherlands, is infamous with British motorists who pass the sign to the Wankum exit shortly after entering Germany and view the name with amusement (sometimes photographing it) due to its two syllables in written appearance. The first is a British slang term for masturbation and the second may be delivered in speech as a colloquial version of them. Wankum is not far from the municipality called Titz.

At one time, probably the most used petrol station in Germany was in Wankum. British troops serving in Germany may purchase a ration of fuel coupons to buy discounted fuel. However, these coupons are only redeemable at certain petrol stations (Shell, BP and Aral). Wankum was the last station before the Dutch border to accept petrol coupons; however they no longer do.
