= Waalre =

- Municipality
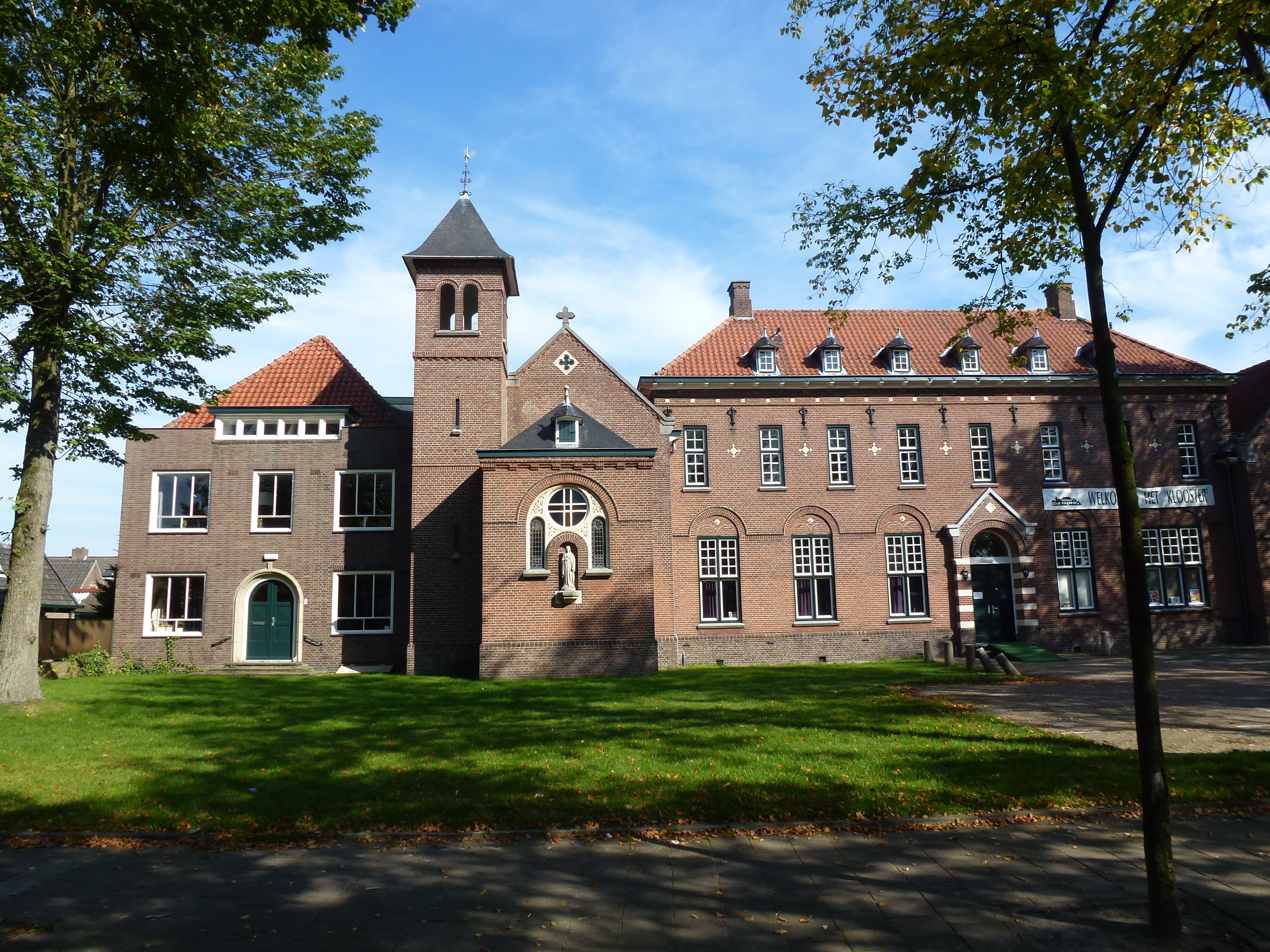
- Former monastery in Waalre

- Flag Coat of arms

- Location in North Brabant
- Coordinates: 51°24′N 5°28′E
- Country: Netherlands
- Province: North Brabant

Government
  - Body: Municipal council
  - Mayor: Marcel Oosterveer (VVD)

Area
  - Total: 22.66 km^{2} (8.75 sq mi)
  - Land: 22.39 km^{2} (8.64 sq mi)
  - Water: 0.27 km^{2} (0.10 sq mi)
- Elevation: 19 m (62 ft)

Population (January 2021)
  - Total: 17,544
  - Density: 784/km^{2} (2,030/sq mi)
- Demonym: Waalrenaar
- Time zone: UTC+1 (CET)
  - Summer (DST): UTC+2 (CEST)
- Postcode: 5580–5583
- Area code: 040
- Website: www.waalre.nl

Waalre (Dutch pronunciation: [ˈʋaːlrə]) is an affluent municipality and town in the province of North Brabant in the southern Netherlands, immediately south of the city of Eindhoven.

== Population centres ==
- Aalst
- Waalre

Waalre is often called the Groenfontein (Green fountain) due to its civic policy of providing a variety of trees in its streets.

Waalre is considered one of the richest villages in the Netherlands due to the numerous millionaires living there. It was voted 7th best Dutch municipality to live in, according to a 2010 Elsevier research. The municipality is surrounded by woods, fields, and lakes. The nearest city is Eindhoven, which is situated on the other side of the A67 motorway.

The spoken language is Kempenlands (an East Brabantian dialect, which is very similar to colloquial Dutch).

== Town council ==
The current town council was elected at the 2026 local elections.

Council seats
Party	2002	2006	2010	2014	2018	2022	2026
D66	1	1	2	4	3	3	3
Aalst-Waalre Belang	4	2	5	3	4	3	3
VVD	4	4	4	3	3	3	3
CDA	3	3	3	3	2	3	3
GroenLinks/PvdA	0	0	0	0	0	0	3
GroenLinks	0	1	1	1	2	2	**
Zelfstandig Waalre (ZW14)	0	0	0	2	2	2	2
PvdA	2	4	2	1	1	1	**
Gemeente Belangen '74	3	2	*	0	0	0	0
Total	17	17	17	17	17	17	17

*2010: Gemeente Belangen '74 merged with Aalst-Waalre Belang.
**2026: Combined GroenLinks/PvdA list.

== Waalre town hall ==
In July 2012 the town hall of Waalre was destroyed by a fire caused by two cars driving into the building from opposite ends at night.

== Notable people ==
- Geert Jan Jansen (born 1943 in Waalre) a painter and art forger, who was arrested in 1994 and convicted in 2000.
- Pierre Karsmakers (born 1946 in Waalre) 1973 AMA National Champion and three-time Dutch motocross national champion (1967, 1969, 1972).
- John Baselmans (born 1954 in Aalst) an artist, sculptor, graphic designer and illustrator, lives in Curaçao
- Jan van den Dobbelsteen (born 1954 in Waalre) an interdisciplinary artist who teaches at Academy St. Joost
- Frans van Houten (born 1960) CEO of Royal Philips Electronics since 2011
- Martijn Oostra (born 1971 in Waalre) a graphic designer, photographer, artist and publicist

== Gallery ==
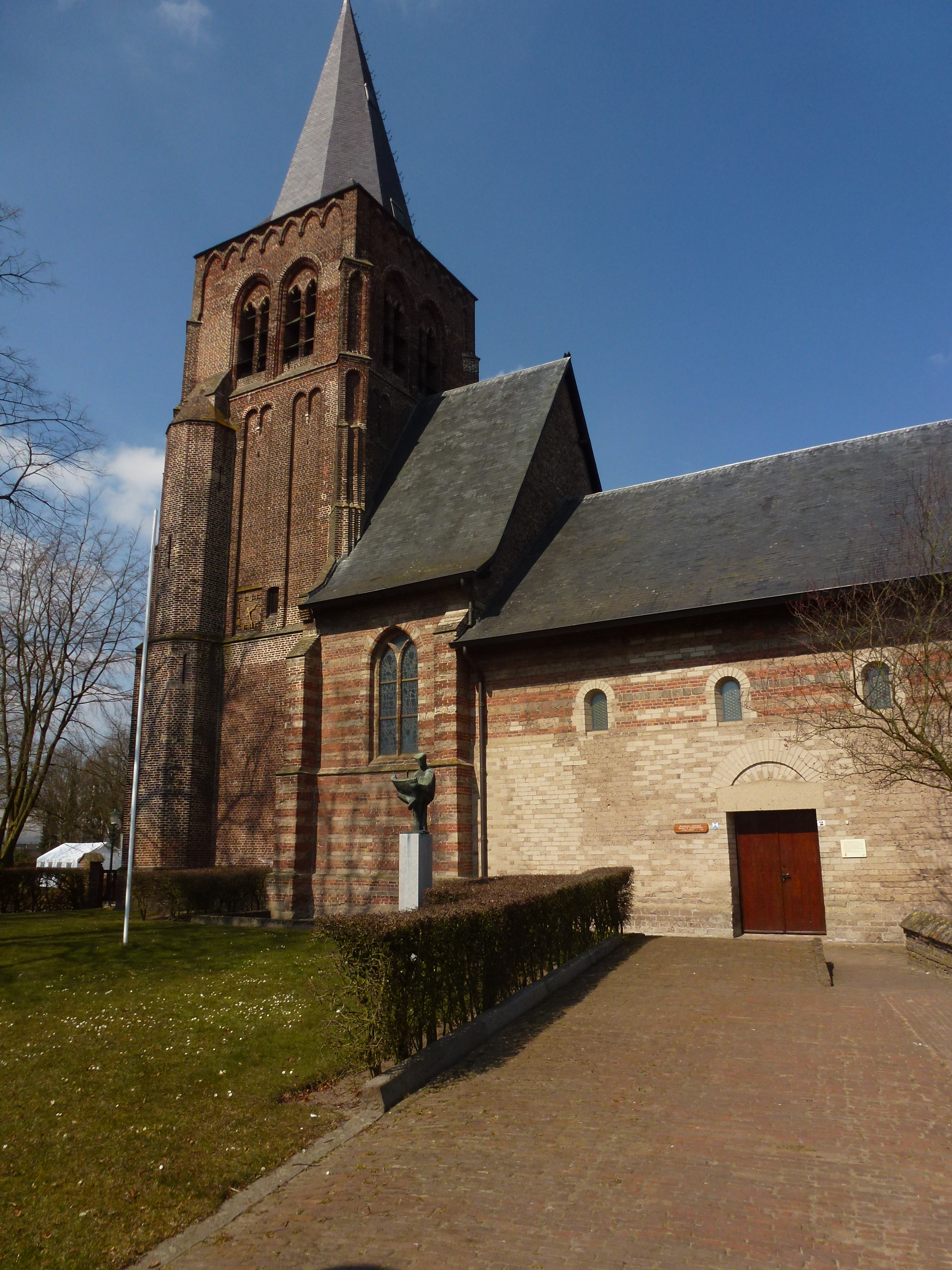
Oude Sint Willibrordus kerk, Waalre

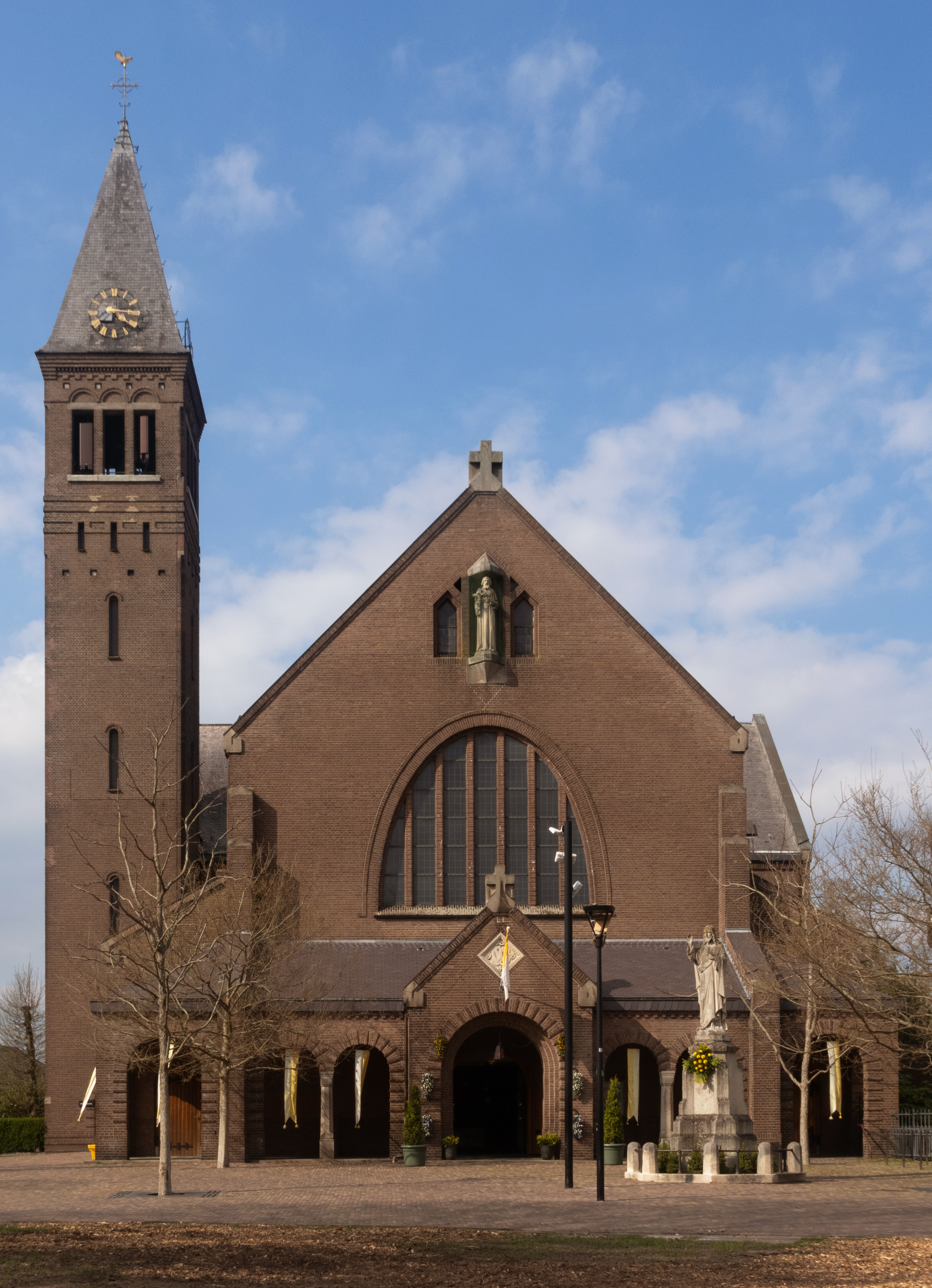
Waalre, church: the Sint-Willibrorduskerk

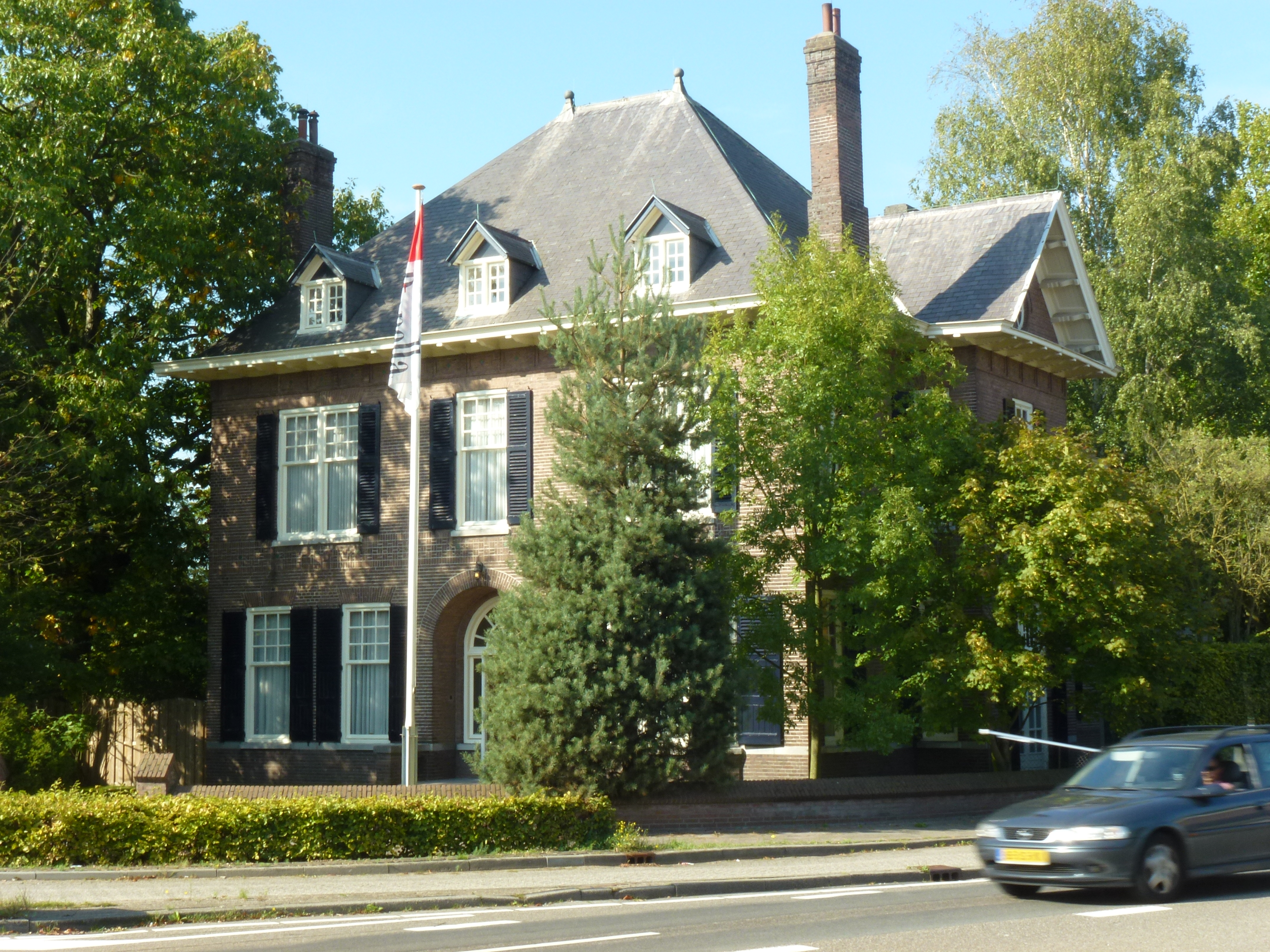
Eindhovenseweg, Waalre

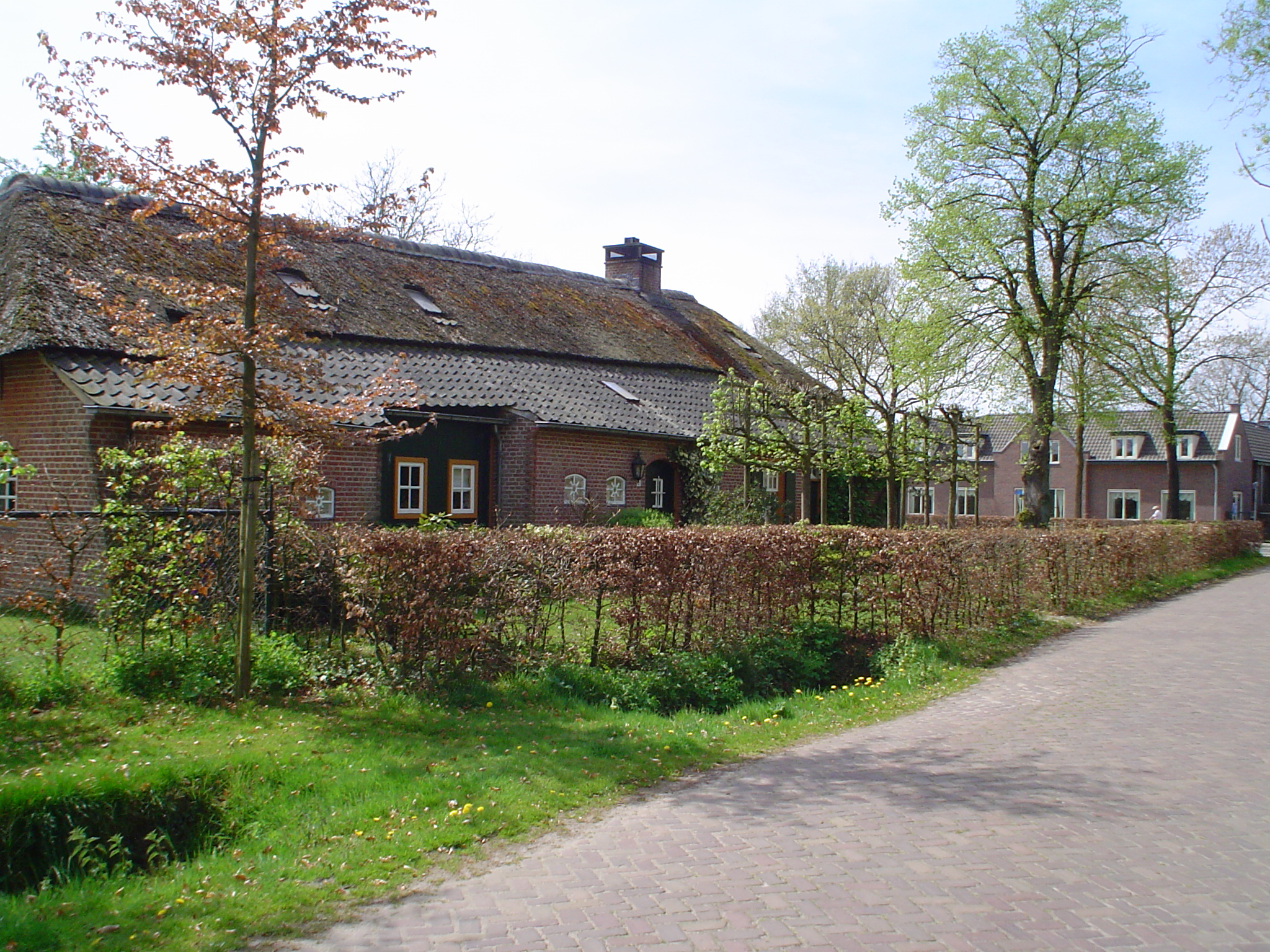
Heikant, a hamlet located between Waalre and Valkenswaard

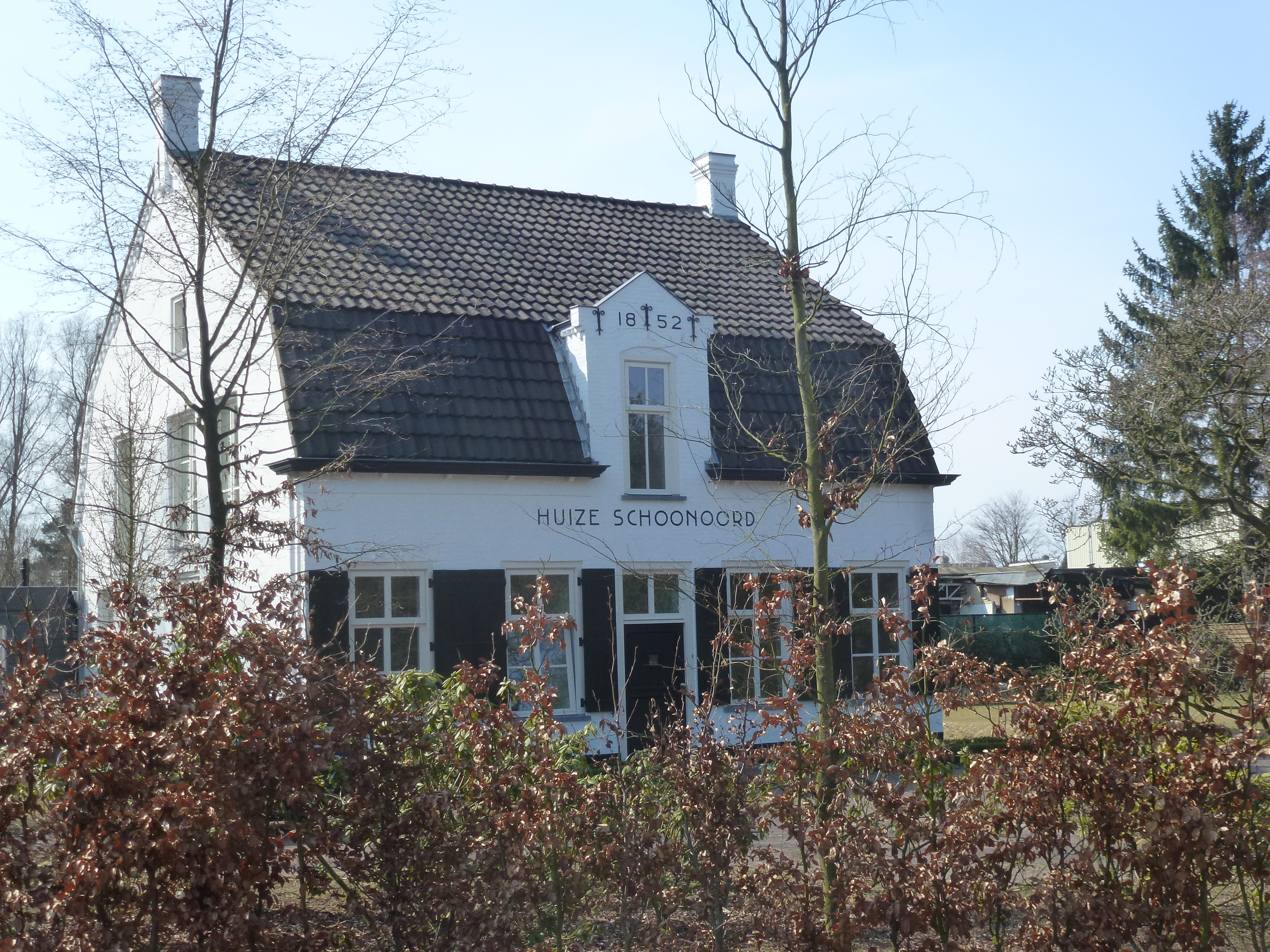
Eindhovenseweg, Aalst
