= Arcen en Velden =

Arcen en Velden Árse en Velde (Limburgish)
- Former Municipality
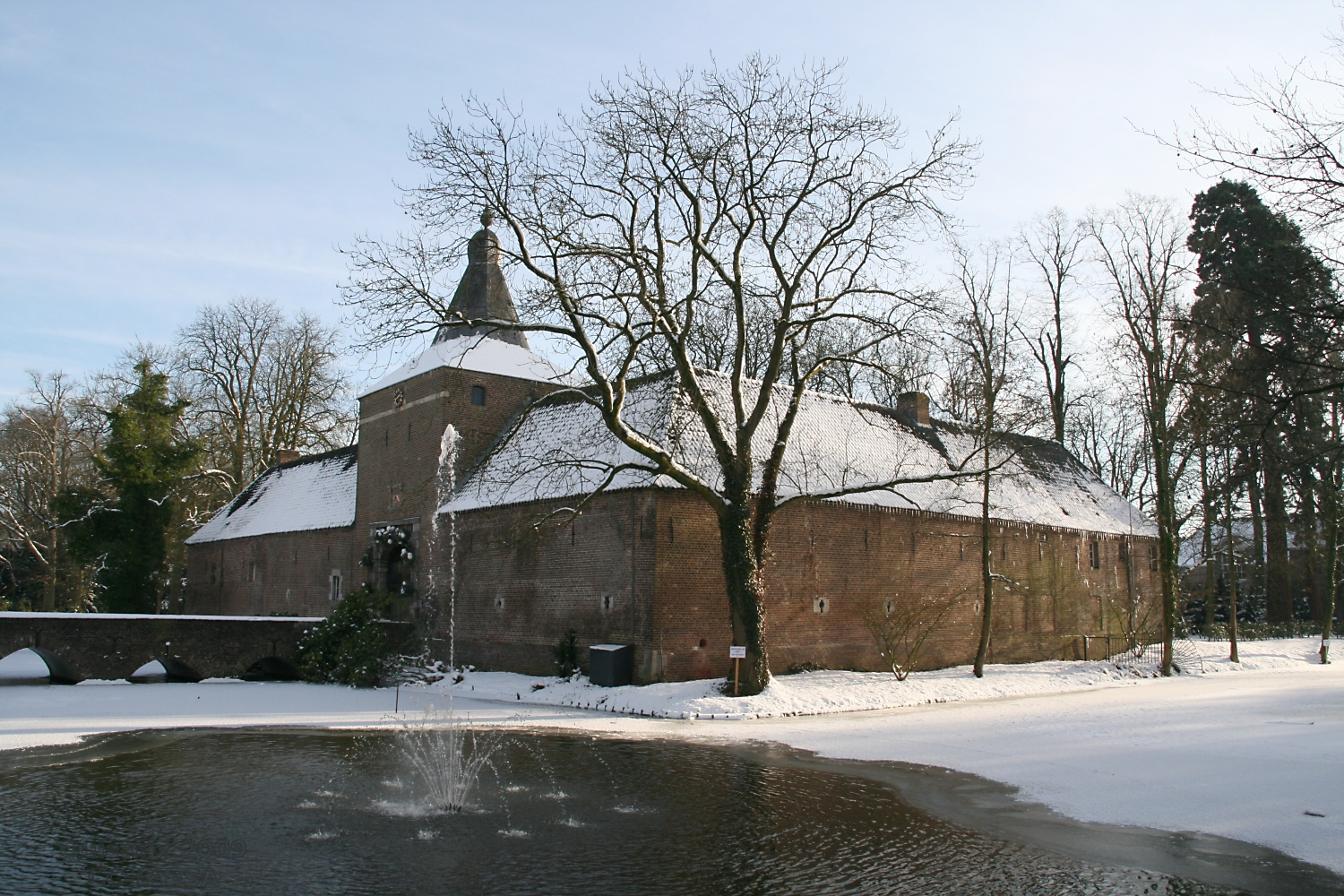
- Castle Arcen

- Flag Coat of arms
- Interactive map of Arcen en Velden
- Coordinates: 51°27′N 6°11′E
- Country: Netherlands
- Province: Limburg

Area (2006)
  - Total: 41.54 km^{2} (16.04 sq mi)
  - Land: 39.68 km^{2} (15.32 sq mi)
  - Water: 1.85 km^{2} (0.71 sq mi)

Population (1 January 2007)
  - Total: 8,788
  - Density: 221/km^{2} (570/sq mi)
- Source: CBS, Statline.
- Time zone: UTC+1 (CET)
  - Summer (DST): UTC+2 (CEST)

Arcen en Velden (Dutch: [ˈɑrsə(n) ɛɱ ˈvɛldə(n)]; Limburgish: Árse en Velde) is a former town and former municipality in the southeastern Netherlands, now part of the municipality and city of Venlo. It is situated in the province of Limburg.

== Population centres ==
- Arcen
- Lomm
- Velden

== History ==
The villages which now form Arcen en Velden have been occupied or ruled by different countries over the centuries, including Spain during the Eighty Years' War, Prussia, Austria, and France during the reign of Napoleon. From 1830 until 1839, the villages together with most of Limburg were a part of the newly independent Belgium. Since 1839, it is part of the Netherlands. As of 1 January 2010, the (now former) municipality of Arcen en Velden, has become incorporated with the municipality and city of Venlo, situated to the south of the (now former) town.
