= A2 motorway (Netherlands) =

Highway in the Netherlands

A2 motorway
- Rijksweg 2
- Motorways in the Netherlands with A2 and N2 bolt

Route information
- Part of E25 / E34 / E35
- Maintained by Rijkswaterstaat
- Length: 217.098 km (134.898 mi)

Major junctions
- North end: E19 / E35 / A 10 / S 110 in Amsterdam

- A 9 in Amsterdam-Zuidoost; E25 / E30 / E35 / A 12 in Utrecht; E311 / A 27 in Vianen; E31 / A 15 near Deil; A 59 in 's-Hertogenbosch; A 65 in Vught; A 50 in Eindhoven; E312 / A 58 in Eindhoven; E34 / A 67 in Eindhoven; A 73 near Echt; E314 / A 76 near Geleen; A 79
- South end: E25 / A25 at Belgium border

Location
- Country: Kingdom of the Netherlands
- Constituent country: Netherlands
- Provinces: North Holland, Utrecht, Gelderland, North Brabant, Limburg

Highway system
- Roads in the Netherlands; Motorways; E-roads; Provincial; City routes
← A 1	→ N 3

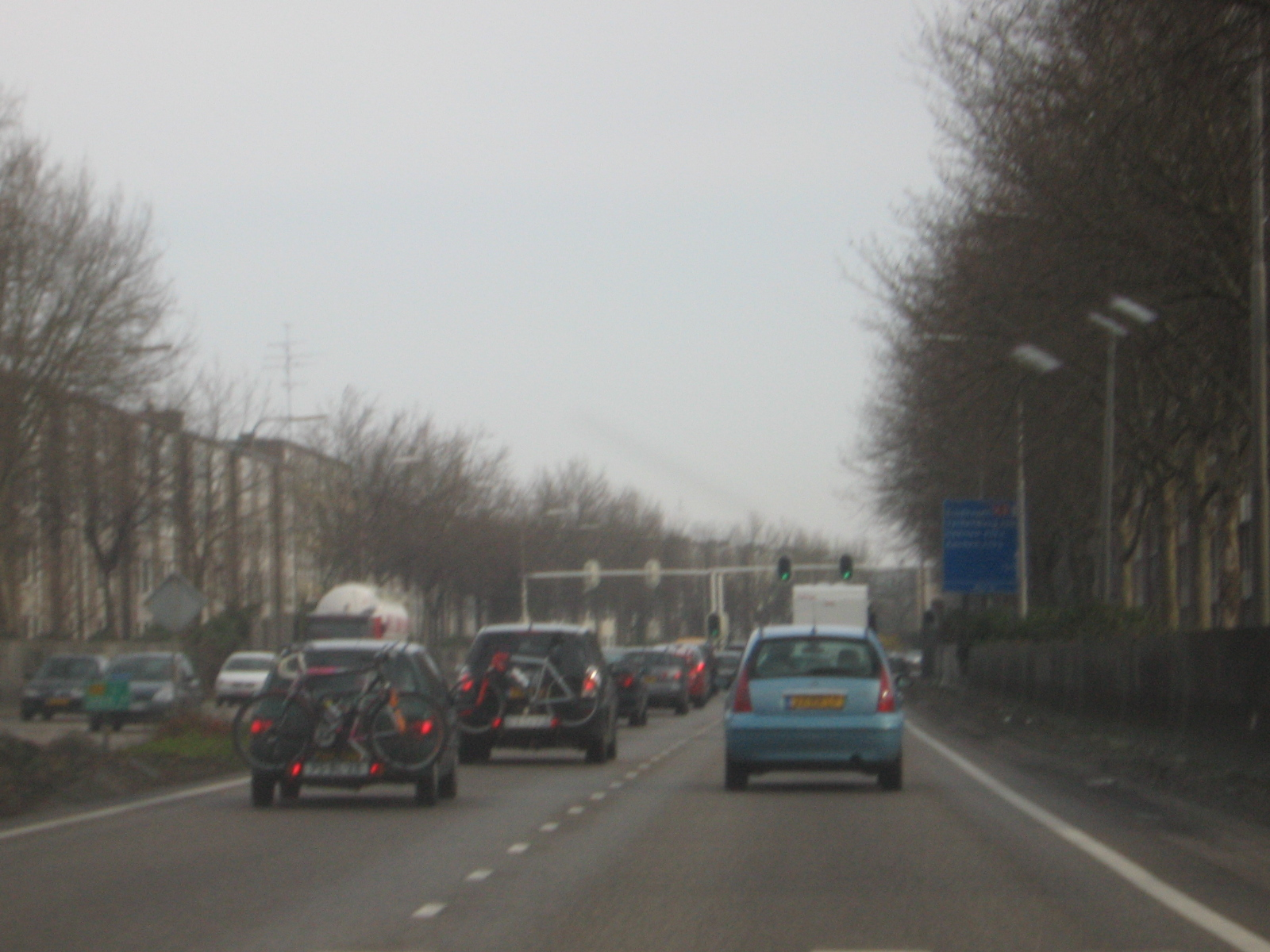
The N2 through Maastricht.

The A2 motorway is a motorway in the Netherlands. It is one of the busiest highways in the Netherlands. The road connects the city of Amsterdam, near the Amstel interchange, with the Belgian border, near Maastricht (NL) and Liège (B), and the Belgian A25 road.

The route of the A2 motorway is shared with two major European routes. Between its start, at Amstel Interchange, near Amsterdam, and the Interchange Oudenrijn, near Utrecht, European route E35 follows the A2 motorway. From the Oudenrijn Interchange towards the Belgian border just south of Maastricht, European route E25 follows the route of the A2. Local and express lanes on A2 have different speed limits. The speed limit on express lanes is 120 km/h (75 mph) and locals is 100 km/h (~62 mph).

== Route description ==
=== Road N2 ===
In the past, the motorway A2 was interrupted at one location, near Maastricht. This section was referred to as N2, to make a distinction between the motorway (A2) and the non-motorway (N2).

==== The N2 through Maastricht ====
Until recently, the motorway A2 was interrupted between the interchanges Kruisdonk and Europaplein through Maastricht. This road section was built as a highway (N2) with several at-grade intersections with traffic lights. In December 2016 the Koning Willem-Alexandertunnel was opened to traffic, a 4-lane tunnel built in two layers, which put an end to this situation.

==== The N2 around Eindhoven ====
The beltway around the city of Eindhoven, the so-called Randweg between the interchanges Ekkersweijer and Leenderheide, uses a system of local-express lanes. The inner two lanes do not have any exits, so it is exclusively for express traffic passing the city of Eindhoven; it is considered a motorway (A2) with a maximum speed of 120 km/h (75 mph). The outer two lanes are used by vehicles to and from Eindhoven and the neighbouring towns. It does not meet the Dutch standards of a motorway (steeper grades near intersections and smaller bend radiuses), and has a maximum speed of 80 km/h (50 mph). These outer lanes have road number N2, to distinguish the local lanes from the express lanes.

== Future plans ==
=== Junctions Het Vonderen and Kerensheide ===
Preparatory work is underway to start widening the A2 motorway between Het Vonderen junction and Kerensheide. It will be effectively widened from 2x2 to 2x3 lanes. It should be ready between 2025 and 2027. It is considered one of the mayor road work plans since the construction of the Koning Willem Alexandertunnel in Maastricht to ease traffic flow.

== History ==
=== Other reconstruction projects ===
The A2 motorway was subject to multiple reconstruction projects. Next to the project between the junctions in Limburg, as described above, the A2 was being rebuilt at the following locations:

==== Amsterdam - Utrecht ====
Between interchanges Holendrecht and Oudenrijn, the road has been widened from six (2x3) to ten (2x5) lanes. It has enough space to expand the road to fourteen (2x7) lanes. Near the city of Utrecht, a system of local-express lanes has been applied, with the inner three lanes serving express traffic, and the outer two lanes serving local traffic. Unlike the situation near Eindhoven, the motorway status is maintained for local lanes, which means that all ten lanes will keep the name A2.

Between 1954 and 1986, a level crossing operated on the motorway.

==== Utrecht - 's-Hertogenbosch ====
Between interchanges Oudenrijn and Everdingen, the A2 was expanded to 2x4 lanes. Between interchanges Everdingen and Deil, the road is widened from four (2x2) to eight lanes (2x4); the section between interchanges Deil and Empel was expanded from four to six lanes.

==== 's-Hertogenbosch beltway ====
The A2 around the city of 's-Hertogenbosch was rebuilt similarly to the future situation near Utrecht. However, there are only just four express lanes, instead of the six near Utrecht, so the road has 4x2 lanes.

==== 's-Hertogenbosch - Eindhoven ====
Since both the 's-Hertogenbosch and Eindhoven beltways were finished in 2009, a new bottleneck appeared between both cities. The motorway has only 2x2 lanes while both beltways are having twice the capacity. Construction of expanding this section to 2x3 lanes started on December 13, 2011.

== Exit list ==
Country	Province	Municipality	km	mi	Exit	Name	Destinations	Notes
The Netherlands	North Holland	Amsterdam	31	19	—	Interchange Amstel	E19 / E35 / A 10 / S 110	North end of E 35 overlap
The Netherlands	North Holland	Ouder-Amstel	33	21	1	Oudekerk aan de Amstel	N 522	
The Netherlands	North Holland	Amsterdam	35	22	—	Holendrecht interchange	A 9	
The Netherlands	North Holland	Amsterdam	36	22	2	Amsterdam-Zuidoost	S 111	Northbound exit and southbound entrance only
The Netherlands	Utrecht	Abcoude	39	24	3	Abcoude		
The Netherlands	Utrecht	De Ronde Venen	44	27	4	Vinkeveen	N 201	
The Netherlands	Utrecht	Breukelen	50	31	5	Breukelen	N 401	
The Netherlands	Utrecht	Utrecht	57	35	6	Maarssen	N 230	
The Netherlands	Utrecht	Utrecht	60	37	7	Utrecht-Leidsche Rijn-Centrum		
The Netherlands	Utrecht	Utrecht	62	39	8	Utrecht-Centrum	N 198	
The Netherlands	Utrecht	Utrecht	64	40	—	Oudenrijn interchange	E25 / E35 / A 12	South end of E 35 overlap; north end of E 25 overlap
The Netherlands	Utrecht	Nieuwegein	68	42	9	Nieuwegein	N 210	
The Netherlands	Utrecht	Nieuwegein	71	44	10	Nieuwegein-Zuid		
The Netherlands	Utrecht	Vianen	72	45	11	Vianen		
The Netherlands	Utrecht	Vianen	74	46	—	Everdingen interchange	E311 / A 27	
The Netherlands	Utrecht	Vianen	79	49	12	Everdingen	N 483 / N 484	
The Netherlands	Gelderland	Culemborg	81	50	13	Culemborg	N 320	
The Netherlands	Gelderland	Geldermalsen	85	53	14	Beesd		
The Netherlands	Gelderland	Geldermalsen	88	55	15	Geldermalsen	N 327	
The Netherlands	Gelderland	Geldermalsen	91	57	—	Deil interchange	E31 / A 15	
The Netherlands	Gelderland	Neerijnen	94	58	16	Waardenburg	N 830	Gap in km near Waalbrug
The Netherlands	Gelderland	Zaltbommel	102	63	17	Zaltbommel	N 322	
The Netherlands	Gelderland	Maasdriel	107	66	19	Kerkdriel	N 831	
The Netherlands	North Brabant	's-Hertogenbosch	112	70	—	Empel interchange	A 59	North end of A59 overlap
The Netherlands	North Brabant	's-Hertogenbosch	113	70	20	Rosmalen		
The Netherlands	North Brabant	's-Hertogenbosch	115	71	—	Hintham Interchange	A 59	South end of A59 overlap
The Netherlands	North Brabant	Veghel	117	73	21	Veghel	N 279	
The Netherlands	North Brabant	Schijndel	119	74	22	Sint-Michielsgestel	N 617	
The Netherlands	North Brabant	Vught	120	75	—	Vught interchange	A 65	Southbound exit and northbound entrance only
The Netherlands	North Brabant	Vught	121	75	23	Tilburg	A 65 / N 601	Northbound exit and southbound entrance only
The Netherlands	North Brabant	Vught	123	76	24	Vught		
The Netherlands	North Brabant	Boxtel	127	79	25	Boxtel-Noord		
The Netherlands	North Brabant	Boxtel	132	82	26	Boxtel		
The Netherlands	North Brabant	Best	138	86	27	Best-West		
The Netherlands	North Brabant	Best	141	88	28	Best		
The Netherlands	North Brabant	Eindhoven	143– 12	89– 7.5	—	Ekkersweijer interchange	A 50	Gap in km due to connection with A50
The Netherlands	North Brabant	Eindhoven	13– 154	8.1– 96	—	Batadorp interchange	E312 / A 58	Gap in km due to connection with A58
The Netherlands	North Brabant	Eindhoven	156	97	29	Eindhoven-Airport		
The Netherlands	North Brabant	Eindhoven	157	98	30	Eindhoven-Centrum		Southbound exit and northbound entrance only
The Netherlands	North Brabant	Eindhoven	158	98	30a	Meerhoven-Zuid		
The Netherlands	North Brabant	Veldhoven	159	99	31	Veldhoven		
The Netherlands	North Brabant	Veldhoven	162	101	32	Veldhoven-Zuid		
The Netherlands	North Brabant	Eindhoven	163– 19	101– 12	—	De Hogt interchange	E34 / A 67	Gap in km due to connection with A67; west end of A67 and E 34 overlap
The Netherlands	North Brabant	Eindhoven	20	12	32a	High Tech Campus		
The Netherlands	North Brabant	Eindhoven	22	14	33	Waalre		
The Netherlands	North Brabant	Eindhoven	23– 170	14– 110	—	Leenderheide interchange	E34 / A 67	Gap in km due to connection with A67; east end of A67 and E 34 overlap
The Netherlands	North Brabant	Valkenswaard	176	109	34	Valkenswaard	N 396	
The Netherlands	North Brabant	Heeze-Leende	178	111	35	Leende		Northbound exit and southbound entrance only
The Netherlands	North Brabant	Cranendonck	183	114	36	Maarheeze		
The Netherlands	North Brabant	Cranendonck	185	115	37	Budel		
The Netherlands	Limburg	Weert	189	117	38	Weert-Noord		
The Netherlands	Limburg	Nederweert	194	121	39	Nederweert	N 275	Gap in km
The Netherlands	Limburg	Leudal	206	128	40	Kelpen-Oler	N 280	
The Netherlands	Limburg	Leudal	213	132	41	Grathem	N 273	
The Netherlands	Limburg	Maasgouw	216	134	42	Wessem		Northbound exit and southbound entrance only
The Netherlands	Limburg	Maasgouw	218	135	43	Maasbracht		Southbound exit and northbound entrance only
The Netherlands	Limburg	Echt-Susteren	220	140	44	Sint Joost	N 276	
The Netherlands	Limburg	Echt-Susteren	221	137	—	Het Vonderen interchange	A 73	Northbound exit and southbound entrance
The Netherlands	Limburg	Echt-Susteren	224	139	45	Echt		
The Netherlands	Limburg	Echt-Susteren	228	142	46	Roosteren	N 296	
The Netherlands	Limburg	Sittard-Geleen	232	144	47	Born	N 297	
The Netherlands	Limburg	Stein	239	149	48	Urmond	N 294	
The Netherlands	Limburg	Stein	241	150	—	Kerensheide interchange	E314 / A 76	
The Netherlands	Limburg	Stein	243	151	49	Elsloo		
The Netherlands	Limburg	Meerssen	246	153	50	Ulestraten		
The Netherlands	Limburg	Meerssen	250	160	51	Meerssen		Southbound exit and northbound entrance only
The Netherlands	Limburg	Maastricht	254	158	52	Maastricht-Noord		Southbound entrance and exit only
The Netherlands	Limburg	Maastricht	254	158	—	Kruisdonk interchange	A 79	Northbound exit and southbound entrance only
The Netherlands	Limburg	Maastricht			—			North end of A2 / N2 road designation
The Netherlands	Limburg	Maastricht	258	160	53	Maastricht-Centrum Noord		Southbound entrance still under construction
The Netherlands	Limburg	Maastricht	261	162	54	Maastricht-Centrum Zuid	N 278	Northbound entrance and southbound exit still under construction
The Netherlands	Limburg	Maastricht			—			South end of A2 / N2 road designation
The Netherlands	Limburg	Maastricht	263	163	55	Maastricht-Zuid		Southbound exit and northbound entrance only
The Netherlands	Limburg	Eijsden	265	165	56	Gronsveld		
The Netherlands	Limburg	Eijsden	268	167	57	Oost-Maarland		Southbound exit and northbound entrance
The Netherlands	Limburg	Eijsden	270	170	58	Eijsden		Northbound exit and southbound entrance only
The Netherlands / Belgium country line	Limburg (NL) / Limburg (BE) province line	Eijsden / Voeren municipality line			—		E25 / A25	Border with Belgium; this road continues as the Belgian A25; south end of E 25 overlap
1.000 mi = 1.609 km; 1.000 km = 0.621 mi: Concurrency terminus; Incomplete access; Route transition
