= Velden, Limburg =

Velden Velde (Limburgish)
- Dorp
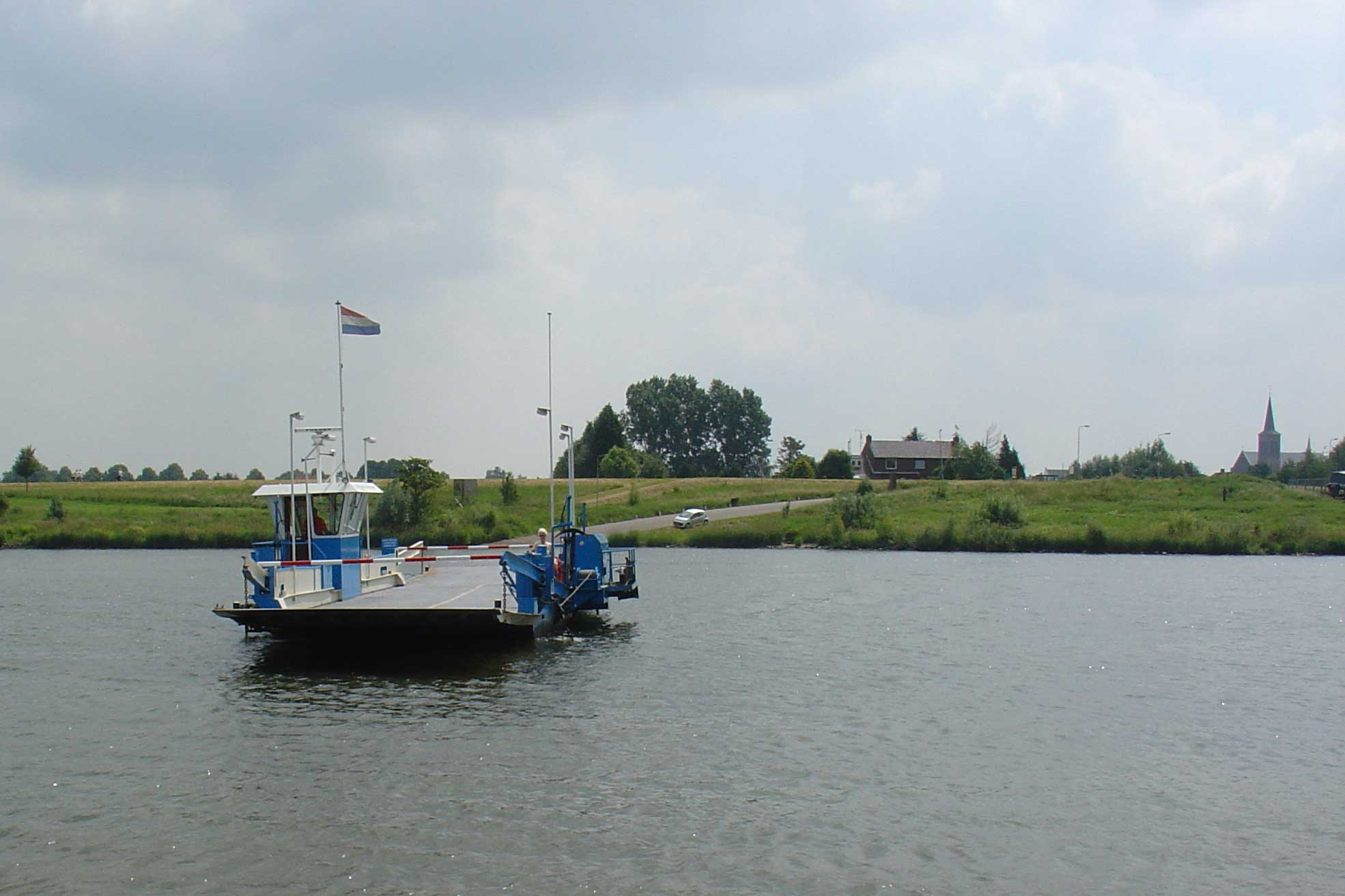
- The ferry (view of Velden)
- Interactive map of Velden
- Coordinates: 51°24′42″N 6°10′4″E
- Country: Netherlands
- Province: Limburg
- Municipality: Venlo

Area
  - Total: 18.84 km^{2} (7.27 sq mi)

Population (2014)
  - Total: 5,085
- Postal code: 5940–5941
- Dialling code: 077-472

Velden (Dutch: [ˈvɛldə(n)]; Limburgish: Velde) is a village in the municipality of Venlo (5,085 inhabitants) in Limburg, Netherlands.

== Location ==
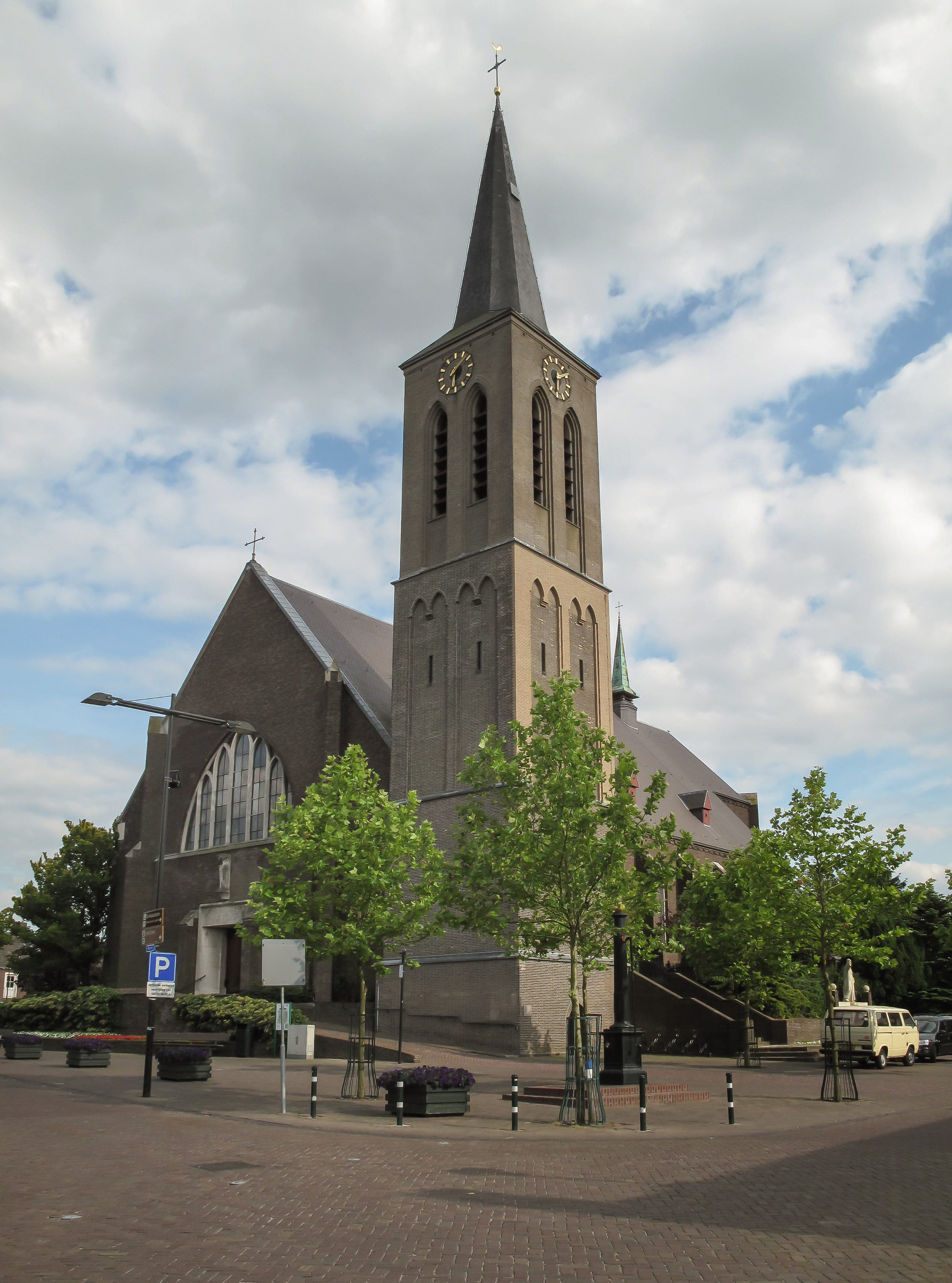
Velden, church

Velden is situated along the river Meuse about 5 km north of the center of Venlo on N 271 Rijksstraatweg. The German border in the east is 2 km.

== History ==
During the War of the Spanish Succession, Velden was also occupied by Prussian troops and so until 1814 the Prussian part of Gelderland. Then it fell to the Kingdom of the Netherlands, which established the border into Germany by the distance of a cannon on the banks of the Meuse to the east. In the Treaty of London in 1839, the limits laid down and the entire area was in 1866 with the Netherlands. Until 1 January 2010 belonged to the former municipality of Arcen en Velden.

== Trivia ==
A ferry crossing the Meuse goes to Grubbenvorst, which is accessible for motorists and cyclists. The long-distance Pieterpad goes through the village. Velden was elected along with two other places as greenest town in the Netherlands in 1999.

== Notable residents ==
Olympian Herman Bouwens and politician Ger Koopmans were born in Velden.
