= List of bridges in Belgium =

This list of bridges in Belgium lists bridges of particular historical, scenic, architectural or engineering interest in Belgium. Road and railway bridges, viaducts, aqueducts and footbridges are included.

== Historical and architectural interest bridges ==
Image	Name	Distinction	Length	Type	Carries Crosses	Opened	Location	Province	Ref.
	Bridge of the Holes dismantled in 2019	Bridge castle Cultural heritage	53 m (174 ft)	Masonry; 3 pointed arches	Footbridge; Scheldt	1329	Tournai; 50°36′46.6″N 3°23′1.4″E	Hainaut	
	Pont de Jambes	Cultural heritage	145 m (476 ft)	Masonry; 7 arches, limestone	Road bridge Meuse	16th century	Jambes–Namur; 50°27′30″N 4°51′57.6″E	Namur	
	Pont romain de Montignies-Saint-Christophe	Cultural heritage	20 m (66 ft)	Masonry; 13 arches	Footbridge; Hantes	18th century	Montignies-Saint-Christophe; 50°16′57.7″N 4°10′57.9″E	Hainaut	
	Pont Népomucène	Historic Centre of Bruges; World Heritage Site; Cultural heritage		Masonry; 1 arch	Road bridge Dijver Canal	18th century	Bruges; 51°12′25.3″N 3°13′37″E	West Flanders	
	Pont de Bouillon			Masonry; 3 pointed arches	Road bridge Semois		Bouillon; 49°47′40.0″N 5°03′52.5″E	Luxembourg Province	
	Pont du Waterhoek demolished	First bridge designed by Arthur Vierendeel	42 m (138 ft)	Truss; Steel; Vierendeel bridge	Road bridge Scheldt	1906	Avelgem; 50°46′27.2″N 3°28′20.6″E	West Flanders	
	Bonifatiusbrug	Historic Centre of Bruges; World Heritage Site		Masonry; 1 segmental arch	Footbridge; Dijver Canal	1910	Bruges; 51°12′17.7″N 3°13′31.3″E	West Flanders	
	Mexicobrug	Cultural heritage	23 m (75 ft)	Truss; Steel; Bascule bridge	Road bridge Houtdok	1941	Antwerp; 51°14′12.5″N 4°24′32.8″E	Antwerp	
	Pont des Arches	Cultural heritage	130 m (430 ft)	Arch; Concrete deck arch	Road bridge Meuse	1947	Liège; 50°38′36.8″N 5°34′43.8″E	Liège	
	Pont brûlé		38 m (125 ft)	Beam bridge Concrete; Vertical-lift bridge	Road bridge Brussels–Scheldt Maritime Canal	1968	Grimbergen; 50°56′52.3″N 4°24′48″E	Flemish Brabant	
	Pont de l'Observatoire	Designed by Santiago Calatrava	208 m (682 ft)	Arch; Steel tied arch	Road bridge A602 Motorway	2002	Liège; 50°37′34.3″N 5°33′49.6″E	Liège	

== Major road and railway bridges ==
Image	Name	Span	Length	Type	Carries Crosses	Opened	Location	Province	Ref.
	Eau Rouge Viaduct	270 m (890 ft)	652 m (2,139 ft)	Arch; Steel deck arch	A27 motorway European route E42; Eau Rouge	1993	Malmedy–Verviers; 50°26′38.8″N 6°0′26.7″E	Liège	
	Godsheide Bridge	210 m (690 ft)	264 m (866 ft)	Cable-stayed; Steel girder deck, steel pylons 54+210+54	Road bridge Albert Canal	1979	Hasselt; 50°42′53.9″N 5°40′18.7″E	Limburg	
	Lanaye Bridge	177 m (581 ft)	232 m (761 ft)	Cable-stayed; Concrete girder deck, concrete pylon	Road bridge Albert Canal	1982	Lanaye; 50°47′2.3″N 5°41′19.3″E	Liège	
	Genk Bridge	176 m (577 ft)	218 m (715 ft)	Arch; Steel tied arch Bow-string bridge	Route nationale 76; Albert Canal	1985	Genk; 50°56′10.5″N 5°28′15.3″E	Limburg	
	Ben-Ahin Bridge	168 m (551 ft)	341 m (1,119 ft)	Cable-stayed; Concrete box girder deck, concrete pylon	Route nationale 643; Meuse	1987	Huy; 50°31′40.3″N 5°12′49.8″E	Liège	
	Pont de Wandre	168 m (551 ft)	527 m (1,729 ft)	Cable-stayed; Concrete box girder deck, concrete pylon 144+30+168	Route nationale 667; Meuse; Albert Canal	1989	Herstal–Wandre; 50°40′23.1″N 5°38′40.5″E	Liège	
	Charlemagne Viaduct	166 m (545 ft)	642 m (2,106 ft)	Box girder Steel; 92+124+166+124	Route nationale 97; Meuse	1981	Dinant; 50°14′29.5″N 4°55′5″E	Namur	
	Vilvoorde Viaduct	162 m (531 ft)	1,689 m (5,541 ft)	Box girder Steel	Brussels Ring; Brussels–Scheldt Maritime Canal; Senne	1977	Vilvoorde; 50°54′51.2″N 4°24′59.6″E	Flemish Brabant	
	Houffalize Viaduct	162 m (531 ft)	370 m (1,210 ft)	Arch; Concrete deck arch	A26 motorway European route E25; Ourthe	1979	Houffalize; 50°7′52.3″N 5°46′2.3″E	Luxembourg Province	
	Pays de Liège Bridge	162 m (531 ft)	328 m (1,076 ft)	Cable-stayed; Concrete box girder deck, concrete pylon	A602 motorway European route E25; Meuse	2000	Liège; 50°36′58.9″N 5°34′44.7″E	Liège	
	Beez Viaduct	151 m (495 ft)	579 m (1,900 ft)	Box girder Steel; 80+151+80	A4 motorway European route E411; Meuse	1971	Beez; 50°27′53.5″N 4°55′01.2″E	Namur	
	Milsaucy Bridge	144 m (472 ft)	144 m (472 ft)	Arch; Steel tied arch Bow-string bridge	Road bridge Albert Canal	1990	Liège; 50°39′58.8″N 5°38′24.4″E	Liège	
	Haccourt Bridge	139 m (456 ft)	139 m (456 ft)	Arch; Steel tied arch Bow-string bridge	Route nationale 618; Albert Canal	1985	Visé; 50°44′07.6″N 5°40′37.0″E	Liège	
	Hermalle Bridge	138 m (453 ft)	183 m (600 ft)	Arch; Steel tied arch Bow-string bridge	Road bridge Albert Canal	1985	Hermalle-sous-Argenteau; 50°42′53.9″N 5°40′18.7″E	Liège	
	Zutendaal Bridge (2019)	128 m (420 ft)	128 m (420 ft)	Arch; Steel tied arch Bow-string bridge	Albert Canal	2019	Zutendaal; 50°54′49.3″N 5°32′23.2″E	Limburg	
	Eigenbilzen Bridge	128 m (420 ft)		Arch; Steel tied arch Bow-string bridge	Road bridge Albert Canal	2019	Eigenbilzen; 50°53′20.2″N 5°34′29.4″E	Limburg	
	Lixhe Bridge	126 m (413 ft)	309 m (1,014 ft)	Cable-stayed; Composite steel/concrete deck, concrete pylons	Route nationale 602; Albert Canal	1984	Visé; 50°45′02.9″N 5°40′35.9″E	Liège	
	Albert Ier Bridge	125 m (410 ft)	170 m (560 ft)	Box girder Steel	Road bridge Meuse	1957	Liège; 50°37′57″N 5°34′22.9″E	Liège	
	Heer-Agimont Bridge	124 m (407 ft)	202 m (663 ft)	Cable-stayed; Composite steel/concrete deck, steel pylons 39+124+39	Route nationale 909; Meuse	1973	Heer–Heer-Agimont; 50°10′15.2″N 4°49′33.4″E	Namur	
	Genenbos Bridge	123 m (404 ft)	123 m (404 ft)	Arch; Steel tied arch Bow-string bridge	Road bridge Albert Canal	2021	Lummen; 51°00′55.3″N 5°13′58.9″E	Limburg	
	Antoing Bridge	120 m (390 ft)	439 m (1,440 ft)	Arch; Steel tied arch Bow-string bridge	HSL 1 Scheldt	1995	Antoing; 50°33′33.1″N 3°26′06.1″E	Hainaut	
	Polleur Viaduct	119 m (390 ft)	464 m (1,522 ft)	Box girder Steel; 2x94+119+93	A27 motorway European route E42	1979	Theux; 50°32′05.3″N 5°52′33.5″E	Liège	
	Remouchamps Viaduct	117 m (384 ft)(x2)	939 m (3,081 ft)	Box girder Steel; 94+108+2x117+76	A602 motorway European route E25; Amblève	1980	Remouchamps; 50°28′0″N 5°43′0″E	Liège	
	Gellik Railway Bridge closed	113 m (371 ft)	113 m (371 ft)	Arch; Steel tied arch Bow-string bridge Vierendeel bridge	Hasselt-Maastricht railway Albert Canal		Lanaken; 50°52′44.8″N 5°36′53.4″E	Limburg	
	Hammer Bridge	100 m (330 ft)(x2)	200 m (660 ft)	Truss; Composite steel/concrete	Belgian railway line 37; Geul	2009	Raeren; 50°42′12.3″N 6°02′49.9″E	Liège	
	Noordland Bridge		260 m (850 ft)	Truss; Steel	N101; Scheldt–Rhine Canal	1975	Antwerp; 51°22′6.7″N 4°18′1.3″E	Antwerp	

== Notes and references ==
- Nicolas Janberg. "International Database for Civil and Structural Engineering". Structurae.com.
- Others references

== See also ==
- fr:Liste des ponts de Bruxelles (in French) - List of bridges in Brussels
- fr:Liste des ponts de Liège (in French) - List of bridges in Liège
- fr:Liste des ponts de Namur (in French) - List of bridges in Namur
- nl:Lijst van bruggen over het Albertkanaal (in Dutch) - List of bridges over the Albert Canal
- Transport in Belgium
- Rail transport in Belgium
- List of motorways in Belgium
- Geography of Belgium
