= Amalberga of Temse =

8th-century Frankish saint

Saint Amalberga of Temse
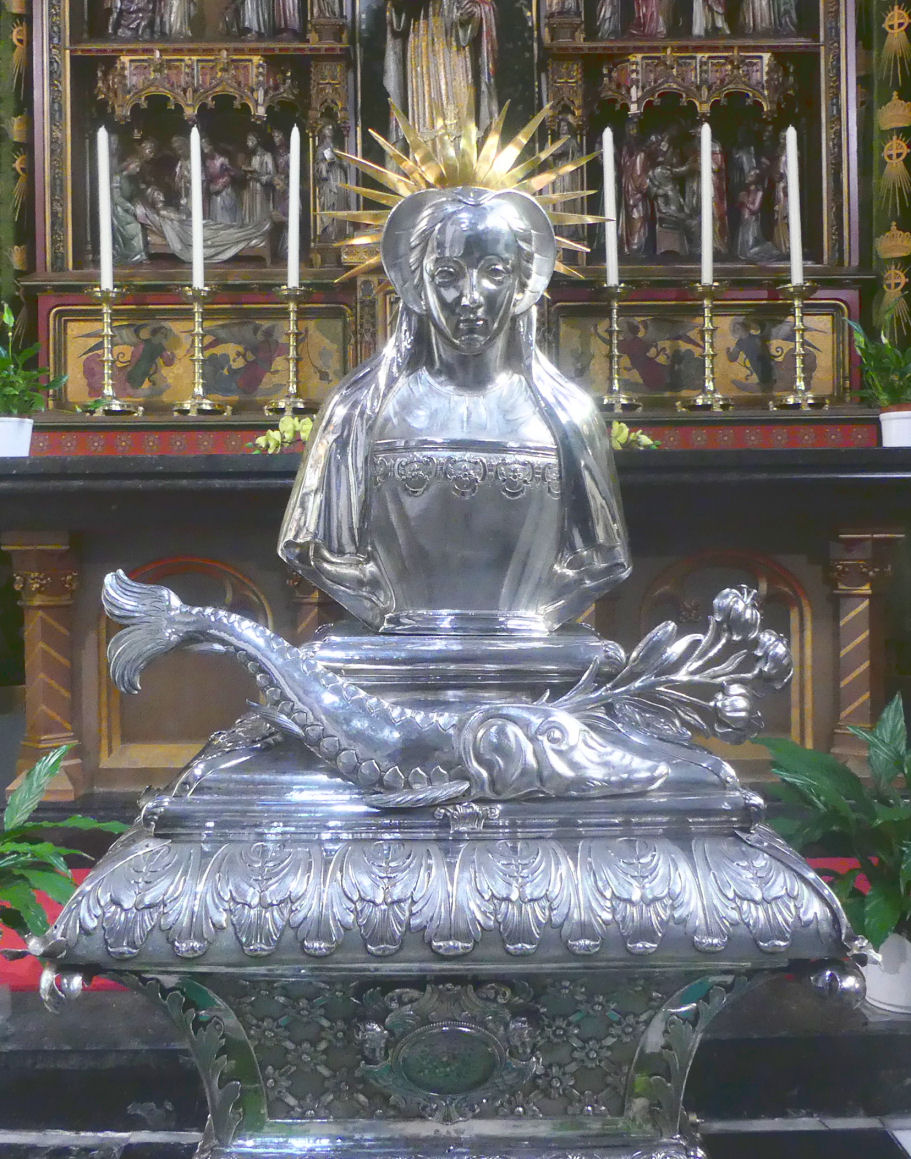
- Shrine of Saint Amalberga, with the sturgeon
- Born: c. 741 AD probably in the Ardennes then in Francia (probably in modern-day Belgium)
- Died: c. 10 July 772
- Venerated in: Catholic Church; Eastern Orthodox Church
- Major shrine: Ghent
- Feast: July 10
- Attributes: a sturgeon depicts how she escaped harm on the back of a sturgeon

Amalberga of Temse (also called Amalia and Amelia; b. 741 in Ardennes, Belgium, d. July 10, 772 in Bilsen) was probably a Frisian venerated Christian woman who was likely a Frankish subject from the Ardennes, located in Francia. She was a consecrated virgin, and probably the superior abbess of nuns in a religious community. She is considered as a saint in both the Catholic Church and the Eastern Orthodox Church, despite never being officially canonized as a saint. Raised by Saint Landrada, who founded Munsterbilsen Abbey, she is known for her refusal of Charlemagne's offer of marriage. Amalberga became a nun under Landrada and either succeeded her as abbess or governed a community of nuns on her own lands.

According to legend, Amalberga experienced miraculous events while escaping from Charlemagne. This included the healing of her arm after it was broken by Charlemagne, and a sturgeon miraculously appearing to carry her safely across the Scheldt River. Other miracles reportedly occurred surrounding the appearance and provision of sturgeon and large fish, and she is often depicted with them. A yearly procession in Amalberga's honor occurs near Pentecost. Amalberga is invoked to heal intestinal disease, fever, and pains in the arms and shoulders. She is the patron saint of upper limb injuries and of Temse, Belgium. Her feast day is July 10.

== Life ==
Amalberga was raised by and was the ward of Saint Landrada, founder of Munsterbilsen Abbey. According to hagiographer Sabine Baring-Gould, "From early childhood she was distinguished for her innocence, piety, and exceeding beauty". John T. Williams and his colleagues called her "greatly revered" throughout Flanders. In Williams' study of the historical origins of the patron saints of trauma, they state that Amalberga was famous throughout Western Europe at the time "for her remarkable beauty, nobility and devoutness". They recount the legend that her reputation attracted the attention of Pepin the Short, who insisted that she marry his son, Charlemagne. When Amalberga, who was residing at Munsterbilzen Abbey and "had made up her mind to devote herself to the Lord", declined, Charlemagne came to the abbey to persuade her. She again refused. In what Williams calls "an unusual and fortuitous distraction", Charlemagne became involved in a bear hunt that gave Amalberga time to escape. Pepin married off Charlemagne to Hildegard, but Charlemagne found Amalberga hiding in a church in Meteren and "was horrified to find she had cut off her hair in an attempt to disguise herself from him". He "burst into a paroxysm of rage" and broke her arm while trying to drag her from the church, but her arm was immediately healed. She was able to escape from him again, to the banks of the Scheldt River. An enormous sturgeon is said to have carried her on its back to safety to Temse. Historian Matthew Hartley states that Charlemagne was unable to move her "owing to a mysterious power that rendered her immovable". Hartley also says that Charlemagne became ill, but that he "repented and was healed through her prayers". The editors of Butler's Lives of the Saints call the story "worthless" and states that the depiction in the Acta Sanctorum is "a pure romance", although he states that the version of the story recorded by Radboud of Utrecht during the 10th century "is of some value".

According to hagiographer Agnes Dunbar, Amalberga became a nun under Landrada and either succeeded her as abbess or governed a community of nuns on her own lands. She died in Bilsen on July 10, 772, at the age of 31, and was buried at the church she built in Temse, which was dedicated to the Virgin Mary. Dunbar reports that Amalberga's body was escorted from Bilsen to Temse by "a number of sturgeon". Amalberga's relics were translated in 870 to Saint Peter's Abbey at Ghent, but were dispersed by the Calvinists in 1578.

== Miracles and legacy ==
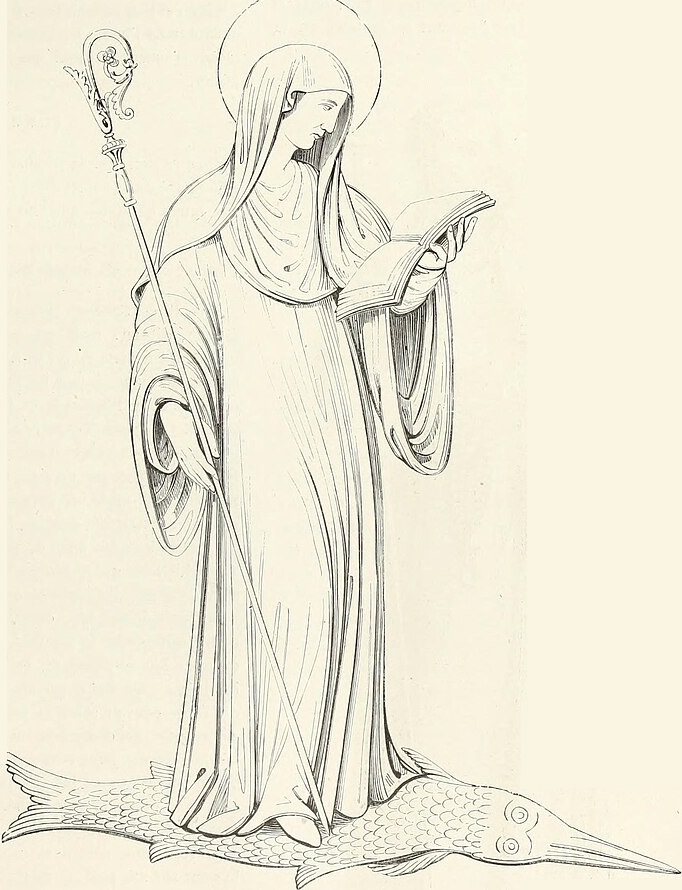
Saint Amalberga, depicted with the sturgeon and holding a book and pastoral staff

Baring-Gould and Dunbar state that the fishermen of the Scheld River, in honor of the miracle that enabled Amalberga to escape from Charlemagne, offer a sturgeon each year on her feast day to her chapel in Temse. Dunbar states that "no sturgeon is ever seen in those waters except on that day, when one presents itself". Dunbar also states that twice during Amalberga's life, she fed people during famine, "on the flesh of large fish which appeared opportunely in the river".

A procession is made yearly, during Pentecost, in her honor. The procession occurs three times per year, on Whit Monday (Pentecost Monday), and on Whit Saturday (the Saturday before the last Sunday of September) in Temse. It is a 23 km-long pilgrimage on foot, starting at the local church in Temse and continuing through eight Amelberga chapels and one small chapel honoring Our Lady of Seven Sorrows. Amalberga's relics are carried only on Whit Monday. The procession also was done on horseback and by covered wagon. The procession, which dates from the 11th century, was popular throughout the ensuing centuries; musicians, magicians, and clowns also participated. There were periods in which it sharply declined in popularity, but experienced revivals several times.

Baring-Gould and Dunbar relate a story about a miraculous fountain; a spring bubbled up in a field near Temse, which the townspeople went to use, destroying the crops there. When the owner refused to allow access to it, Amalberga went to the spring, filled a sieve with water, and brought it to a nearby field, where another spring appeared where she spilled the water. The old spring dried up, and a small chapel, a pilgrimage site for miraculous cures, was built near the new one. According to Dunbar, long after Amalberga's death, a "woman of wicked life", after praying for conversion at the well, was unable to leave the spot, "retaining all her faculties while she kept within a short distance of [the] Well, but becoming paralyzed [when] she attempted to pass that boundary".

Amalberga is represented in art with a sieve in her hand and with a sturgeon, trampling on Charlemagne. She is sometimes represented with geese because it was reported that she banished a flock of geese from Meteren, where they ate the newly-sown grain. She is also often represented standing on a large fish, holding a book and an abbess' pastoral staff, and sometimes holding a sieve. A small print exists of Amalberga, depicting her wearing a king's crown and holding his scepter. She is wearing a nun's dress and holds an open book and a palm, with a halo around her head. She is standing on the ground, on the shoulders of the king, who lies flat on the ground. A large fish appears on each side of her; on one side, behind her, is a large fish, and a flock of geese is on the other side. According to Dunbar, Amalberga has been represented with geese because she has been confused with another saint of the same name.

Amalberga is invoked to heal intestinal disease, fever, and pains in the arms and shoulders. She is the patron saint of upper limb injuries, due to the legend about Charlemagne's assault of her, and of Temse, Belgium. Her feast day is July 10.

== Works cited ==
- Baring-Gould, Sabine (1897). "S. Amalberga, V.". The Lives of the Saints. Vol. 7: July Pt. 1. London: J. C. Nimmo.
- Dunbar, Agnes B.C. (1904). "St. Amelberga (2)". A Dictionary of Saintly Women. Vol. 1. London: George Bell & Sons.
- Williams, John T.; Kissin, Eleanor R.; Kissin, Mark W. (18 January 2022). "Miracles, Martyrdom and Violence: Historical Origins of the Patron Saints of Trauma and Orthopaedic Surgery". Cureus. 14 (1) e21355. doi:10.7759/cureus.21355. ISSN 2168-8184. PMC 8853946. PMID 35198270.
