= Hasselt – Maastricht tramway =

Sneltram Hasselt - Maastricht

Overview
- Locale: Province of Limburg, Belgium Maastricht, Province of Limburg, Netherlands
- Transit type: fast tram / light rail
- Number of lines: 1
- Number of stations: 13

Operation
- Operator: De Lijn

Technical
- System length: ± 30 km (19 mi).

The Hasselt – Maastricht tramway (Dutch: Sneltram Hasselt - Maastricht) was a proposed light rail system linking Hasselt, Belgian province of Limburg and Maastricht, Dutch province of Limburg. The project was part of the Spartacusplan of Belgian Limburg, proposed by the Belgian transport company De Lijn, with the aim of improving the province's transport links. The tramway's opening was originally scheduled for 2017, then postponed until 2025. It was finally cancelled on 10 June 2022 in favour of an electric "trambus".

One factor in the project's cancellation was that in order for the tram to reach Maastricht station, the Sint Servaasbrug over the Maas would have needed to be strengthened. The line would therefore have had to terminate at Maastricht Mosae Forum.

Between the two towns, the planned tramway was to follow the course of a disused railway line. It would have improved links in a northeasterly direction between Maastricht and the southern part of the Dutch Limburg province and Antwerp, as currently the only rail service from the Dutch province to Belgium runs south to Liège-Guillemins.

== Proposed tram stops ==
Due to the weakness of the Sint Servaasbrug, the original plan to have the line terminate at Maastricht railway station was abandoned. Below is the list of future tram stops, as planning stood in September 2020.

Stop	Location	Image	Opened	Additional information
Hasselt	Hasselt		1847	
Kanaalkom	Hasselt		cancelled	
Kolonel Dusartplein	Hasselt		cancelled	
Provinciehuis	Hasselt		cancelled	
Campus Universiteit Hasselt	Diepenbeek		cancelled	
Diepenbeek	Diepenbeek		1856	
Beverst	Beverst		cancelled	
Munsterbilzen	Bilzen		cancelled	
Eigenbilzen	Bilzen		cancelled	
Europaplein	Lanaken		cancelled	
Sphinxkwartier	Maastricht		cancelled	
Mosae Forum	Maastricht		cancelled	
