= Diepenbeek Castle =

Castle in Limburg, Belgium

Coordinates: 50.912°N 5.420°E

- Belgium
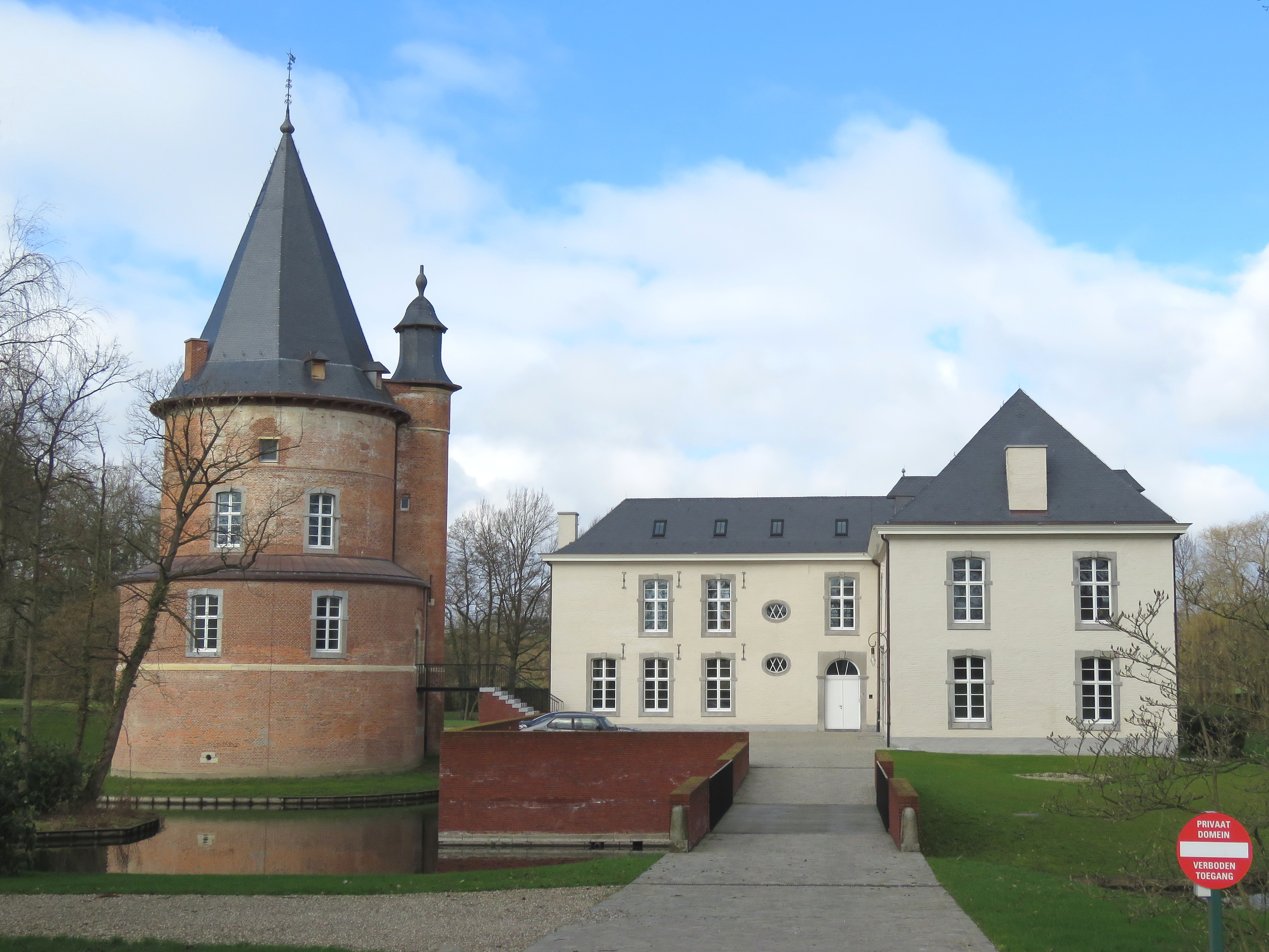

Site information
- Type: Castle

Diepenbeek Castle (Dutch: Kasteel van Diepenbeek, also known as the Rentmeesterij van Alden Biesen) is a castle in Diepenbeek near Hasselt in the province of Limburg, Belgium. The building consists of a 15th-century keep with a 17th-century main block. It was once the establishment of the steward (Dutch: Rentmeester) of the nearby Commandery of Alden Biesen, whence the alternative name.

== See also ==
- List of castles in Belgium
