= Munsterbilzen Abbey =

Coordinates: 50°53′16″N 5°31′34″E

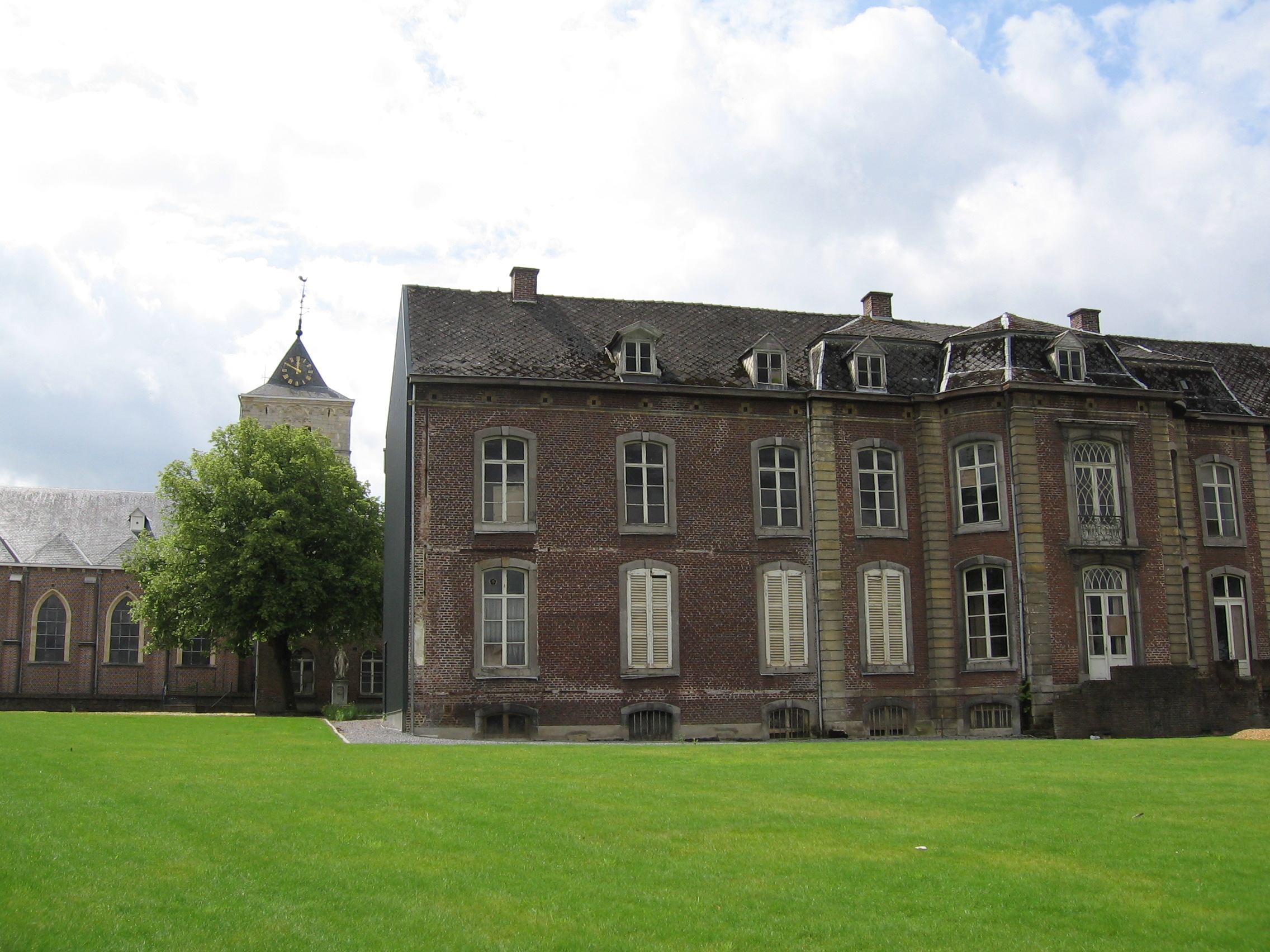
18th century abbey buildings, designed by Johann Joseph Couven

Munsterbilzen Abbey was an abbey of Benedictine nuns in Munsterbilzen, Limburg, Belgium, founded in around 670 by Saint Landrada. It was plundered by Vikings in 881 but restored. From the 9th century it was dedicated to Saint Amor.

It was an imperial abbey of the Holy Roman Empire separately administered from the surrounding County of Loon. The abbess exercised lordship over the village of Munsterbilzen and four more villages nearby until 1773, when she was forced to recognize the suzerainty of the Prince-Bishop of Liège. The abbey was dissolved and its property confiscated at the time of the French Revolution.

Dating back to the time of the Merovingian dynasty, it is considered the oldest women's convent in the Greater Netherlands, and, together with the abbey of Sint-Truiden, the abbey of Aldeneik, the abbey of Susteren, and the abbey Rolduc, one of the most important monasteries in the Dutch-speaking part of the diocese of Liège.

== History ==
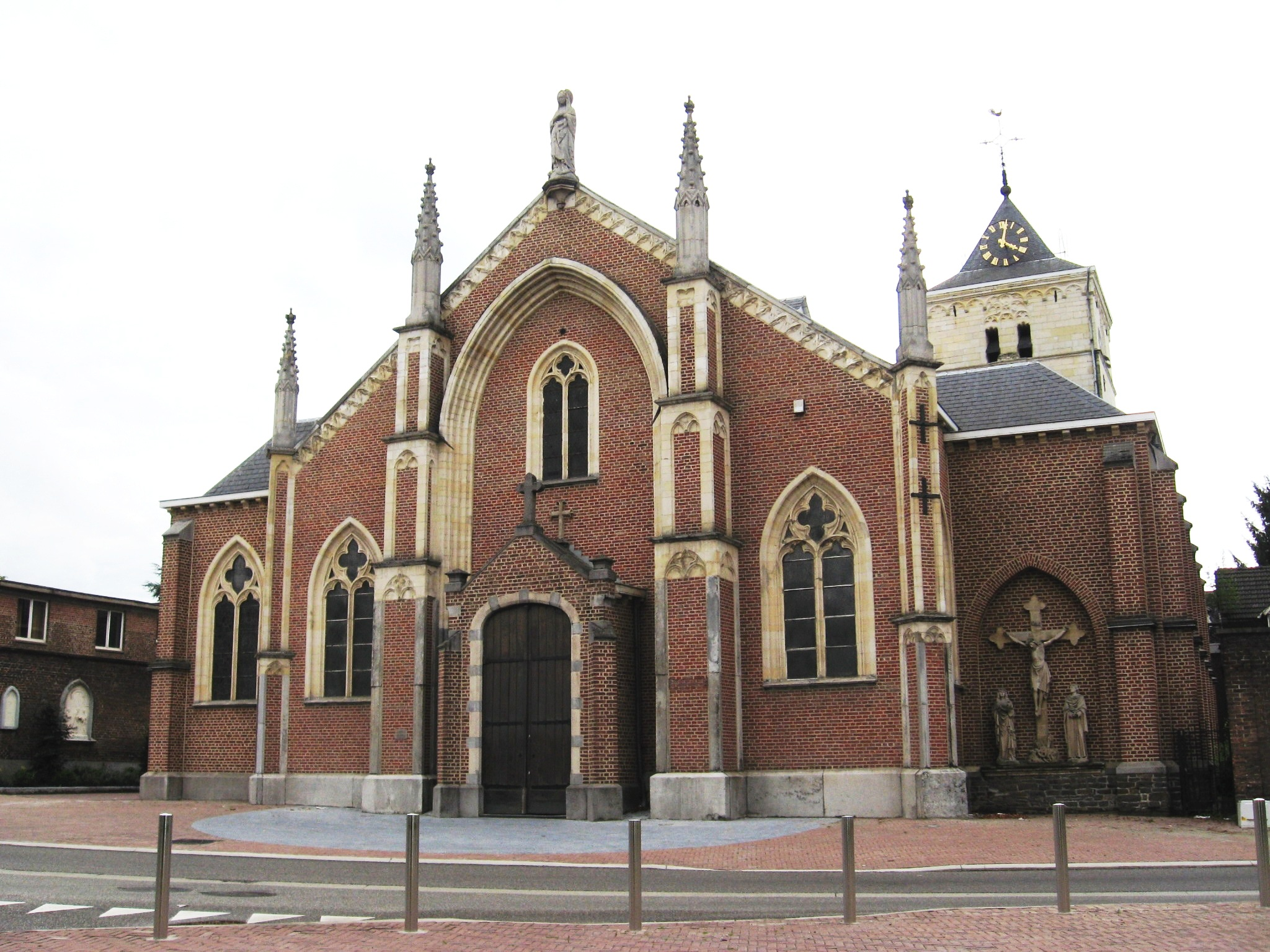
The neo-Gothic parish church with late medieval tower

The women's abbey of Belisia (Bilzen) was, according to legend, founded around 670 by the holy Landrada, possibly under the direction of Lambertus, bishop of Maastricht (from 669 to 709). Another legend mentions the Holy Amor of Aquitaine as the founder of the monastery. The abbey church is also named after him. The village that formed near the abbey was named Belisia Monasterii, or Munsterbilzen, to distinguish between Beukenbilzen (now Bilzen) and Eikenbilzen (now called Eigenbilzen).

In 881 the abbey of Munsterbilzen, as well as the abbey of Sint-Truiden and the churches of Tongeren, Liège, and Maastricht, were destroyed by the Normans. In the third quarter of the 10th century the monastery was rebuilt, and thereafter called Monasterium Sancti Amoris, in honor of Amor of Aquitaine. The abbey church played an important role in the establishment of the County of Loon in the 10th and 11th century. Several Hesbaye nobles were buried in the abbey church, such as count and countess Clodulf and Hilda, count and countess Bengarius and Berta, and in 1044 Count Gozelo I of Verdun..

Under Ida van Bonen, the mother of Godfrey of Bouillon and Boudewijn I of Jerusalem, around the middle of the 11th century, the abbey of Munsterbilzen received a large number of bequests, among others in Bilzen, Riemst, Waltwilder, Martenslinde, Gellik, Eigenbilzen, and Rijkhoven.

At the end of the 12th century the monastery was transformed from a noble woman's abbey in a Noble chapter of secular canonesses, over which the count of Loon had custody. Those who were attached to the secular chapter took part in the choral prayer every day, but did not have to keep monastic vows. Only part of the building complex was located within its walls and in later centuries many canonesses lived outside the monastery.

The abbess was not only Lady of Munsterbilzen, but also had rights over the villages of Wellen, Haccourt, Hallembaye, and Kleine-Spouwen. She was a princess of the Holy Roman Empire and regarded herself as sovereign ruler over these five villages. From the 17th century this right was disputed by the Saint Lambert's chapter of Liège and the prince-bishop, and after many processes the abbess in 1773 definitively recognized the sovereignty of the bishop.

In 1794, after the invasion of the French following the French Revolution, the chapter was dissolved and the abbey goods were sold. In the course of the 19th century most of the buildings were demolished, including the abbey church. In the late 19th century, the De Lamberts de Cortenbach family owned the abbey. Since 1895, in the remaining buildings a nursing institution for psychiatric disorders has been established, initially run by the congregation Sisters of Saint Joseph from Clermont-Ferrand, and now known as the Medical Center Sint-Jozef. Other buildings served as a post office and town hall.

== List of abbesses of Munsterbilzen ==
- Landrada (?-690), monastic poet
- Guda van Heinsberg-Valkenburg? (1157-1173), dochter van Gosewijn I van Valkenburg
- Daughter of Imagina of Loon (before 1203-1214)
- Mechtildis van Are, or Mathilde (about 1220-1249), sister of Gérard II, Count of Looz
- Mathilde van Pietersheim (1267-1287)
- Aleidis (Ida) van Valkenburg († 1296), daughter of count Theodoric II of Falkenburg (Dutch: Dirk II van Valkenburg), sister of Roman queen Beatrice of Falkenburg
- Cecilia Hoen († 1458), daughter of Nicolaas II Hoen, Lord van Hoensbroek
- Odilia van Buymelborn (1550-1582)
- Isabelle Henriette of Aspremont-Lynden Castle (about 1725)
- Antoinette van Eltz-Kempenich (about 1766)

== Building description ==
Almost nothing is left of the once powerful medieval monastery. From the old parish church, right next to the disappeared abbey church, only the church tower from 1565-67 remains. The church itself is neo-Gothic. In the interior there is a Roman baptismal font, the tombstone of canoness Anna van Merode, and a large number of paintings and sculptures from the 15th-18th century. Also during excavations in 2006 under the parish church the remnants of an early medieval church of 11 x 5.7 m were found.

The so-called abbess house and the main entrance in Maaslandse renaissance style were rebuilt around 1730-50 after a design by the Aachen architect Johann Joseph Couven. The abbey school was built in 1725 at the expense of Abbess Anne-Antoinette of Tilly d'Aspremont of Lynden van Reckheim and was among other things meant for free education to six poor girls. The abbey complex is surrounded by a partly renovated monastery wall, on which are found the coats of arms of some abbesses.

== Evangeliarium of Munsterbilzen and Wachtendonckse Psalms ==
The sentence "Tesi samanunga vvas noble unde scona" ("This monastic community was noble and clean") plays an important role in the history of the Dutch language. The six words were added in 1130 under a list of names in the gospel of Munsterbilzen, a Carolingian manuscript. The gospel of Munsterbilzen also contains an Ordo Stellae (also called Officium Stellae), a three-kings game, which is considered to be the oldest play in the Netherlands. In December 2008, this precious codex threatened to be auctioned at the London auction house Sotheby's. Eventually, after much lobbying, the gospel libraries remained in possession of the Bollandists in Brussels, where it has been around since 1842.

In addition to the goseliarium, a Carolingian psalter, called the Wachtendonckse Psalmen, was kept in the abbey of Munsterbilzen. This lost psalms book from the early 9th century was mentioned in a travel report from 1446 as belonging to the possessions of the abbess of Munsterbilzen. In 1591 it was in the possession of the Liège canon Arnold Wachtendonck, rector of the Landrada altar in the abbey of Munsterbilzen, and as a result of a dispute between two candidate abbesses the pope had been appointed as supervisor of the property and income of the monastery. Wachtendonck was a notorious collector of antiques and had appropriated the ancient Psalterium, which according to tradition had once belonged to the Holy Amor of Aquitaine. Wachtendonck lent the psalterium to the Leuven scholar and humanist Justus Lipsius, who copied and studied it. The Wachtendonck Psalms transmitted via Lipsius form the oldest known book in an early form of the Dutch language.
