= Bridge of the Holes =

Bridge of the Holes Pont des Trous
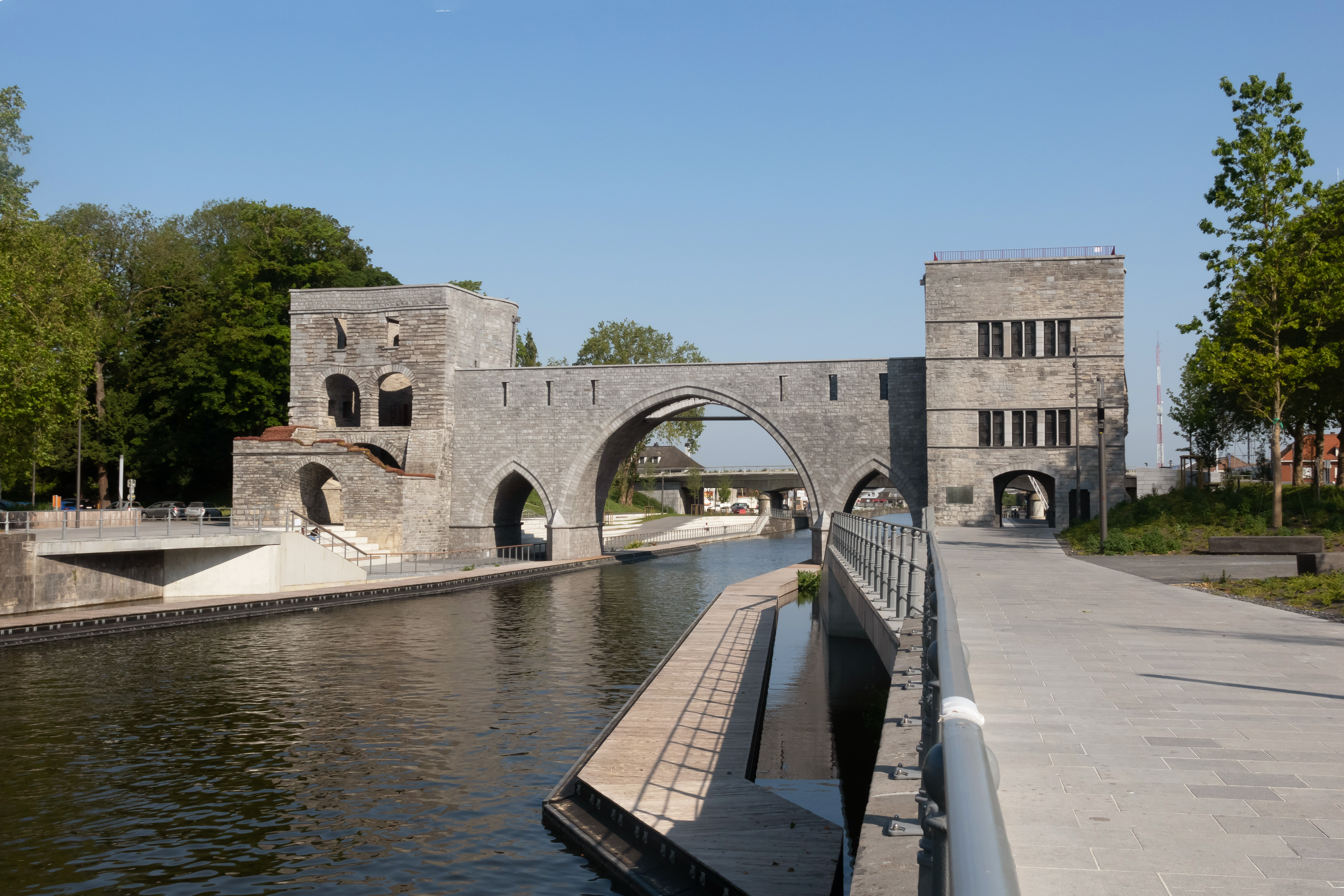
- Coordinates: 50.61292°N 3.38373°E
- Crosses: Scheldt
- Locale: Tournai, Belgium

History
- Built: 1281

Location
- Interactive map of Bridge of the Holes

The Bridge of the Holes (French: Pont des Trous) is a Gothic style water gate, erected in the 13th century, framed by two towers and spanning the river Scheldt in Tournai, in Belgium.

The central arch was dynamited at the beginning of the World War II. During the post-war reconstruction, the two intact arches were dismantled and the entire structure was rebuilt according to new proportions – partly using materials from the historic arches – to widen the central arch, and the whole bridge was raised by 2.40 m to facilitate river navigation, while preserving what defined the structure as a medieval water gate.

== History ==
=== Demolition of the arches in 2019 ===
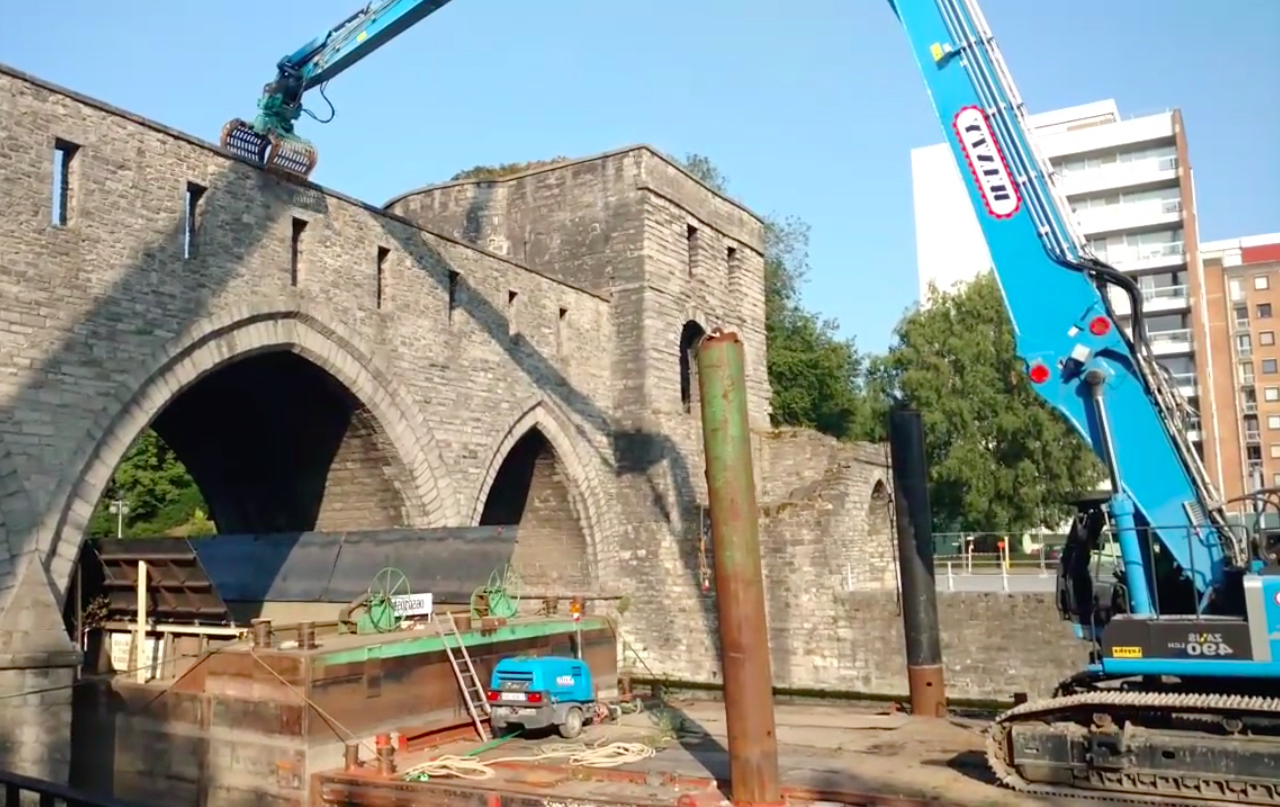
The demolition of the arches began in August 2019.

Since 2013, the Walloon Region has made the widening of the Scheldt a priority, in order to benefit from the development of the Seine-Nord Europe Canal. Heritage advocates are demanding that the elements defining the Pont des Trous as a medieval water gate be preserved: its fortified appearance, curtain wall, and three pointed arches.

Faced with growing opposition, the City of Tournai would be organizing a public consultation on the choice of material to be used to build the central arch: stone or latticework.

Despite the concerns raised, the municipal council voted on January 28, 2019, with the majority voting against the opposition, to modify the municipal road network and the alignment plan. Olivier Bastin's project was therefore approved.

On March 20th, the press was informed of the abandonment of the Bastin project (Courrier de l'Escaut, March 21st). Guarantees were then given to preserve a traditional version. The idea of an appeal to the Council of State was effectively abandoned.

The demolition work began on August 2, 2019.

== See also ==
- List of bridges in Belgium
- List of protected heritage sites in Tournai

== Bibliography ==
- Housen, Jean (2004–2005). "Tournai - pont des Trous" (PDF). Bulletin de la Commission royale des monuments, sites et fouilles. Commission royale des Monuments, des sites et fouilles: 62-64. ISBN 2-87401-130-4.
- Renardy, Christine (2018). Le patrimoine insolite de Wallonie. Carnet du Patrimoine. Namur: Agence wallonne du Patrimoine. p. 44. ISBN 978-2-39038-013-9..
- Bernard Hasquenoph (2023-04-10). Le pont des Trous. Independently Published. ISBN 979-8390701706.
