= Guido Brepoels =

Belgian football coach (born 1961)

Personal information
- Date of birth: 7 June 1961 (age 65)
- Place of birth: Eigenbilzen, Belgium

Team information
- Current team: Genk Ladies (Manager)

Managerial career
- Years: Team
- MVV (youth)
- Tongeren
- Hasselt
- 2004–2007: OH Leuven
- 2007–2008: Lommel United
- 2008–2011: Sint-Truiden
- 2012–2013: Sint-Truiden
- 2013–2014: Dessel Sport
- 2015: Waasland-Beveren
- 2016: KFC Esperanza Pelt
- 2016–2017: Patro Eisden
- 2017: Patro Eisden (youth)
- 2017–2018: Patro Eisden (assistant)
- 2018: Patro Eisden
- 2018–2019: Genk Ladies
- 2019–2020: Diest
- 2020–: Genk Ladies

Guido Brepoels (born 7 June 1961) is a Belgian football coach who coaches Genk Ladies.
