= Gerty Christoffels =

Belgian television presenter (1958–2020)

- Born: Gerty Maria Christoffels; 10 September 1958; Eigenbilzen, Belgium
- Died: 12 October 2020 (aged 62); Antwerp, Belgium
- Occupation: Television presenter
- Known for: De drie wijzen

Gerty Maria Christoffels (10 September 1958 – 12 October 2020) was a Belgian television presenter known for De drie wijzen and Het ei van Christoffels.

== Biography ==
Gerty Christoffels was born on 10 September 1958 in Eigenbilzen. She was a high school teacher by profession, and taught Dutch, English, and religion at various schools. In 1984, she started work at BRT, the Flemish public broadcaster, and presented Boeketje Vlaanderen, a weekly tourist program. In 1987, Christoffels presented Belgium Today, a monthly television program to promote Belgium which was distributed to 50 American broadcasters. Between 1989 and 1991, she presented Het ei van Christoffels, a weekend magazine featuring regional reports.

In 1989, Christoffels became a panel member on the humoristic television program De drie wijzen and stayed on the show for more than ten years. De drie wijzen became one of the most watched programs on Flemish television.

In 1995, Christoffels switched to the commercial broadcaster VTM for which she presented Wie van de drie? and Gerty among others. In 2006, she retired, and started her own communication company. In 2010, Christoffels published her autobiography, De helft van mijn leven in which she also dealt with the difficulties of starting a career outside of television. In 2017, she returned to De Drie Wijzen for a special edition about cancer. In 2018, she was diagnosed with lung cancer.

Christoffels died on 12 October 2020, aged 62 in Antwerp.
