= Hasselt-Maastricht railway =

Railway line in Belgium

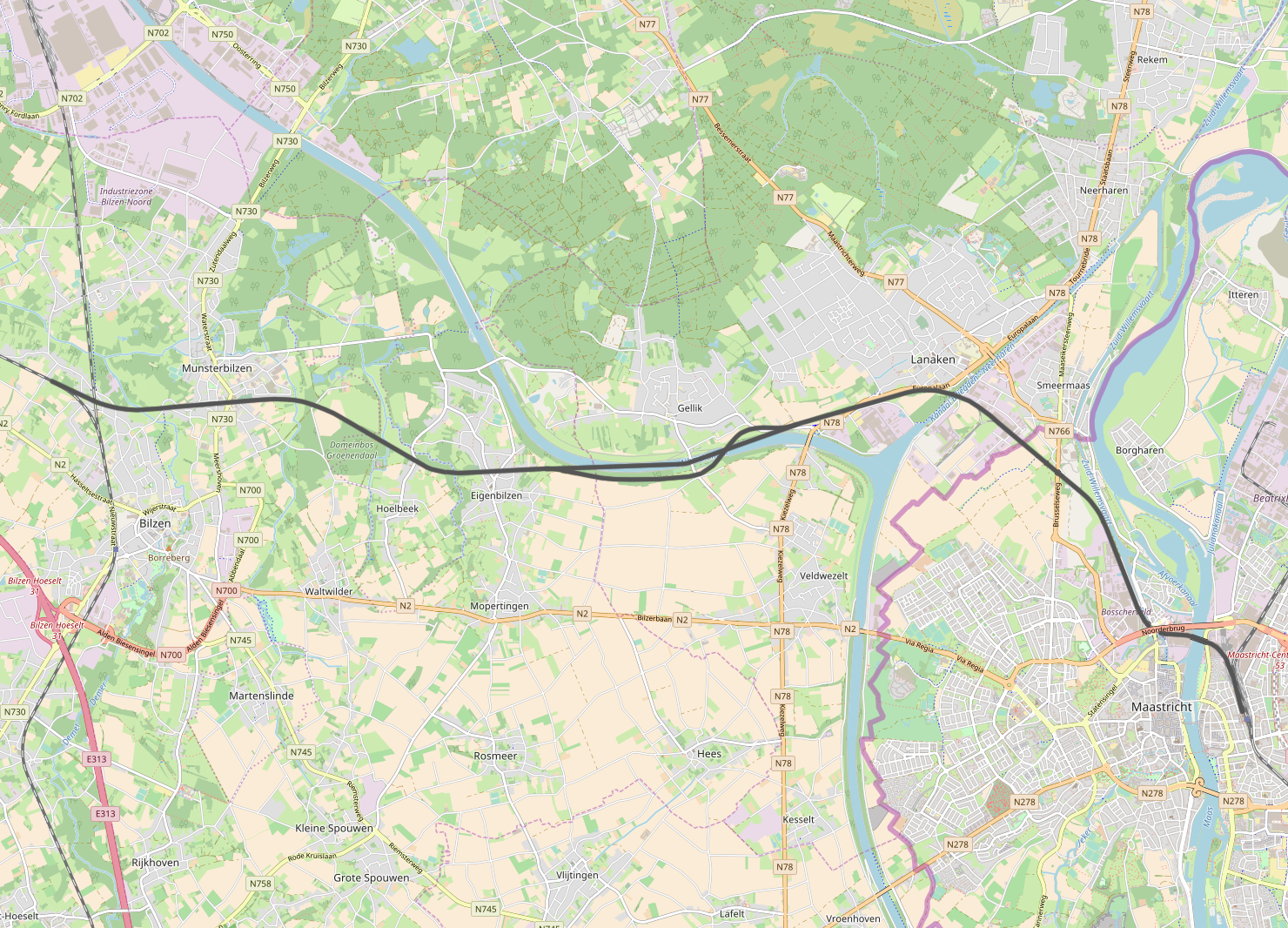
- Hasselt-Maastricht railway connection

Overview
- Status: out of order
- Locale: The Netherlands and Belgium
- Termini: Hasselt railway station; Maastricht railway station

History
- Opened: 1 October 1856
- Closed: 4 April 1954

Technical
- Line length: 17.2 km (10.7 mi)
- Number of tracks: single
- Track gauge: 1435 mm standard gauge
- Electrification: no

Hasselt-Maastricht railway is a railway track that goes from the Y-intersection Beverst with the Hasselt-Liège railway from Hasselt to Maastricht. The line is 17.2 km (10.7 mi) long.

The first plans for a Hasselt - Maastricht - Aachen rail connection date back to 1849. At the beginning of 1853, an approval by royal order was given for a construction of the Belgian part of the connection. The Hasselt-Maastricht line through Beverst and Lanaken was built by the Aachen-Maastricht Railway Company (AM) which operated the Aachen-Maastricht section since 1853. In Hasselt, a connecting curve was also constructed to the railway to Landen. On 1 October 1856, the railway was put into service and the AM took over also its operation.

During the construction of the Albert Canal in 1930–1939, the originally straight line between Eigenbilzen (village in the municipality of Bilzen) and Lanaken was changed. The track was moved to go on the railway bridge in Gellik constructed over the Albert Canal in Gellik.

The section between Beverst and Maastricht was closed to passenger transport on 4 April 1954 and finally to goods transport on 24 November 1992. Between Beverst and Munsterbilzen, the tracks have been broken up except for a few remnants. Between Munsterbilzen and the bridge over the Albert Canal near Gellik the tracks are still present. On the section between Munsterbilzen and Eigenbilzen there is a railbike in operation. The rail connection between the Albert Canal by Gellik and Lanaken is broken again.

The railway line between Maastricht and Lanaken has been refurbished with a subsidy from the European Union and has been reused for freight transport. Strukton has been working on this revitalization since 2007.

A special condition is that Maastricht is a natural habitat of the wall lizard and the slowworm, two very rare animal species in The Netherlands, what had to be taken into account when constructing the Dutch part in Maastricht. A monumental railway bridge over the Brusselseweg in Maastricht also has to be renovated. In July 2009, the section between Lanaken and Maastricht was completed.

On Wednesday, 8 June 2011, for the first time in years, a train ran over the railway line between Maastricht and Lanaken. The train was coming from Aachen and was going through Maastricht to Lanaken. There, on Thursday, 9 June 2011, the train was loaded with 1,200 tons of sand. On Friday, 10 June 2011, the train left with 22 cars for Romania. The closure was announced in September 2016.

According to the Infrabel's "Technical Network Card" edition from 1 January 2019, the section Lanaken – border is "temporarily out of order"; the section border – Maastricht "exists", everything else (west of Lanaken) doesn't exist anymore. The line is designated there as single track and not electrified.

== Stations and buildings ==
Below is an overview of all stations along the line:

Station	Opened	Closed	Current building
Munsterbilzen	1856	1954	none
Eigenbilzen	1856	1954	none
Gellik	1899	1954	none, station closed between 1914 and 1921
Lanaken	1856	1954	none, building burned down in 2006 and demolished in 2010
Maastricht Boschpoort	1856	1954	none, building demolished in 1955
Maastricht	1853	-	1913, SS, 2nd building, unique design by George van Heukelom

== Future ==
The Flemish government and the Flemish transport company De Lijn proposed to reopen the Maastricht - Lanaken - Diepenbeek - Hasselt line as part of the Spartacusplan for improving public transport in Flemish province of Limburg with the use of express trams (lightrail). As a result, the travel time between Maastricht and Hasselt, with stops in Lanaken and Diepenbeek, could be reduced from the current 61 minutes (by bus) to 37 minutes. Up to Diepenbeek, the light rail line was to follow the old route of line 20 and the Liège - Hasselt line. A separate express tram line was to have been built between Diepenbeek and Hasselt, passing the campus of the University of Hasselt and going through the centre of Hasselt to the railway station.

The main costs of the project were connected to the clean-up and redevelopment of the remaining 10 kilometres of track between Lanaken and Beverst and the construction of the new tram line between Diepenbeek and Hasselt. The line was to open in around 2018.

On 1 August 2015, operations on the Munsterbilzen-Gellik section started, using a railbike. The concession was approved for three years, until 2018, when the light rail would start operating. However the commissioning of the light rail service was postponed until 2024. On 10 June 2022 the project was cancelled in favour of an electric 'trambus'.

== Connections ==
In the following places there is or was a connection to the following railway lines:

Y Beverst
Hasselt-Liège railway between Hasselt and Liège-Guillemnins
Maastricht
Liège-Maastricht railway between Y Val Benoît and Maastricht
Aachen-Maastricht railway between Aachen Hbf and Maastricht
Maastricht-Venlo railway between Maastricht and Venlo

== Pictures ==
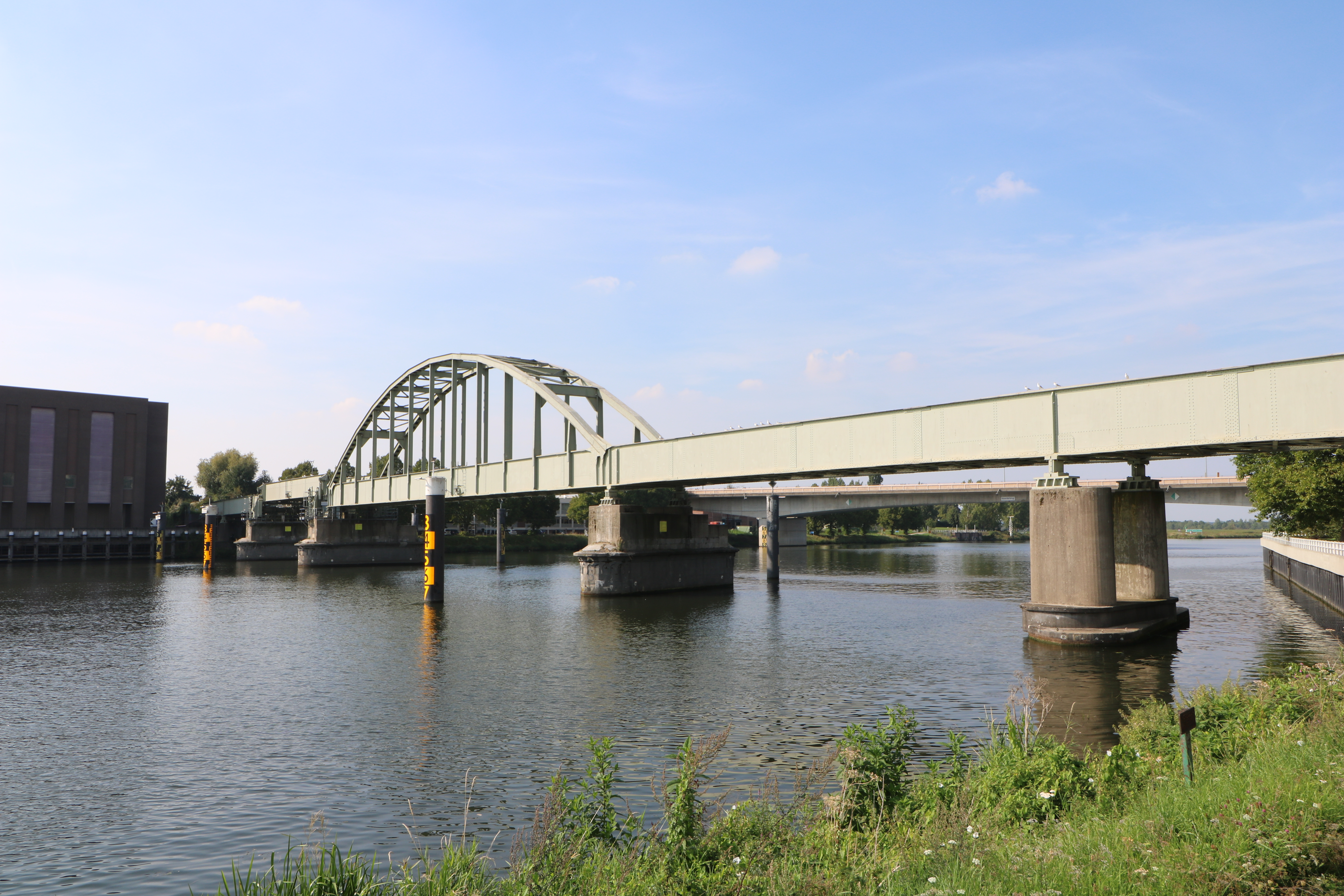
Train bridge over the river Maas in Maastricht on the railway to Hasselt

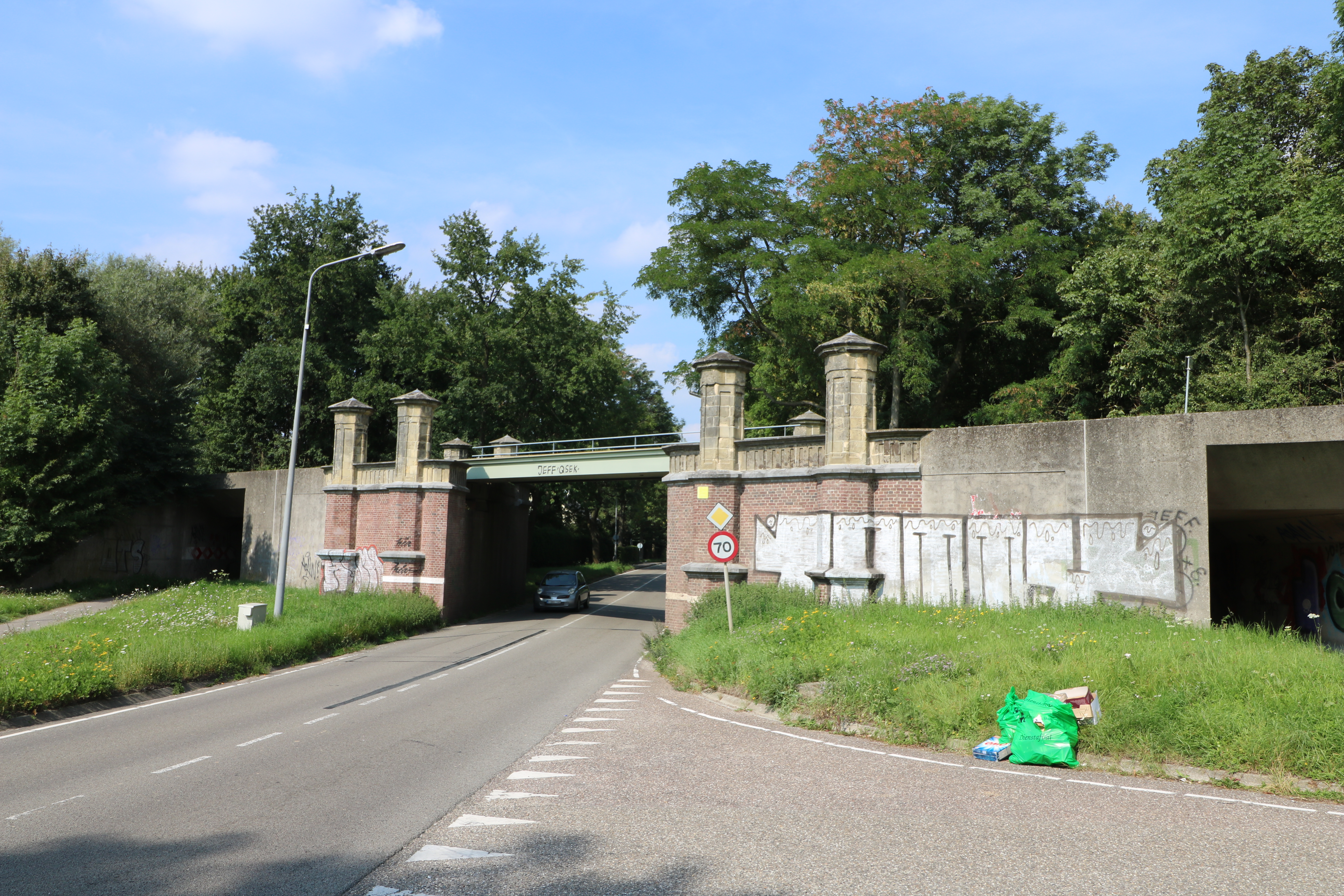
Viaduct on the railway to Hasselt over the Brusselseweg in Maastricht

== See also ==
- List of railway lines in Nederland
- List of railway lines in Belgium
- List of NMBS-stations in Belgium
