= Landrada =

German saint and ascetic (died c. 690–708)

Saint Landrada of Austrasia
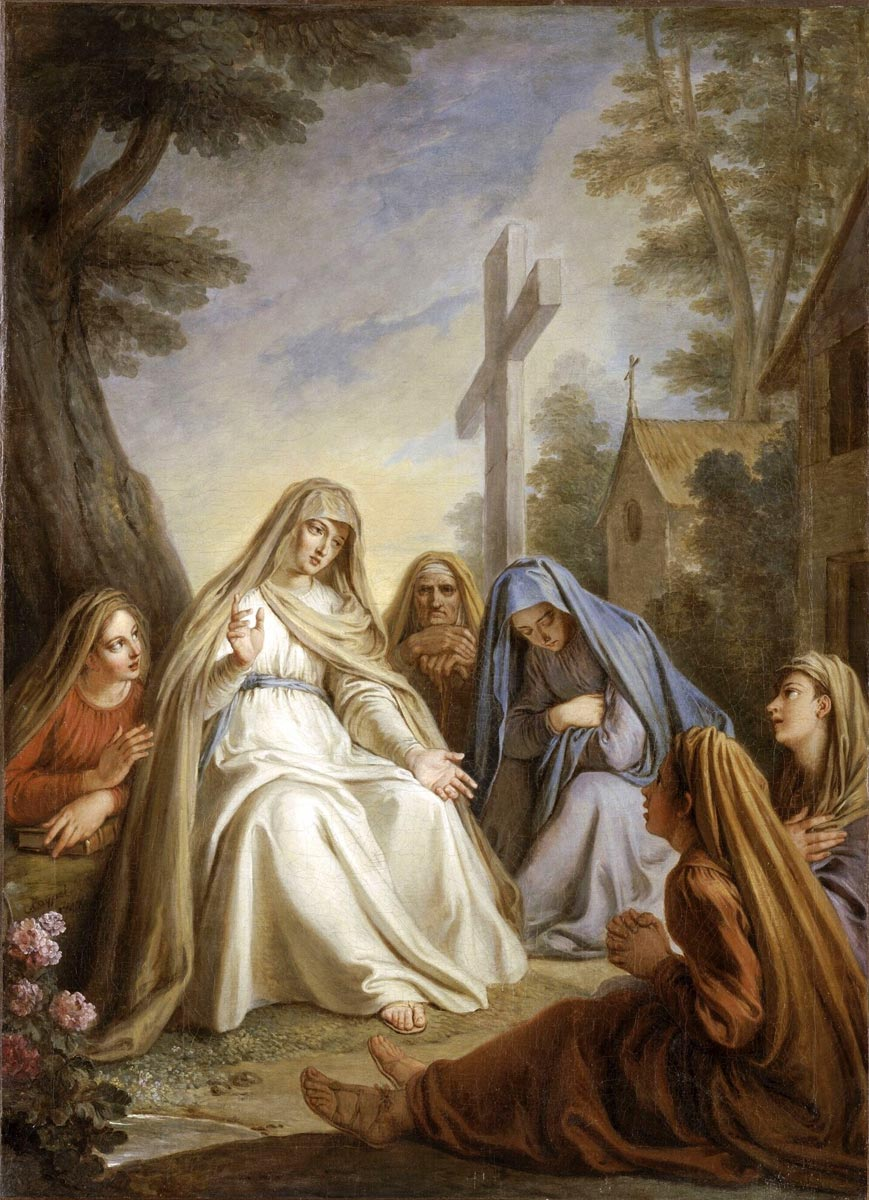
- Saint Landrada Teaching the Widows and the Young (Charles-Antoine Coypel, 1747), oil on canvas in the Château de Versailles
- Born: 7th century
- Died: c. 690; Munsterbilzen Abbey, Austrasia, Francia
- Venerated in: Roman Catholic Church
- Feast: 8 July
- Attributes: prayer, a crucifix surrounded by rays of light, clouds
- Patronage: Munsterbilzen, Ghent

Landrada of Austrasia (also called Leandra, died between c. 690 and 708) was a German saint and ascetic. She co-founded Munsterbilsen Abbey, which was dedicated to the Virgin Mary. Landrada's feast day is 8 July. She is the patroness saint of Munsterbilsen and Ghent.

== Life ==
Landrada was the only daughter of German nobles and part of the family of Pepin of Landen. At an early age, despite being raised in the nobility, she rejected her status and "was regarded, even as a child, as a model of Christian perfection". She received several offers of marriage, which she refused because as her hagiographer Sabine Baring-Gould states, "she had chosen a bridegroom not of this world". Baring-Gould also states that Landrada "kept aloof from all worldly pleasures, and devoted whole days to prayer", left her home and became an ascetic in the nearby forest, in the area of Munsterbilsen in northeastern Belgium. She built her own hut, refused to sleep in a bed or use a bath, and ate only bread and water.

St. Lambert of Maastricht, the bishop of Maastricht-Liège (Tongeren), visited and advised Landrada from time to time; they co-founded a chapel in the forest in honor of the Blessed Virgin Mary, which she also built herself and was the foundation of Munsterbilsen Abbey. According to hagiographer Agnes Dunbar, Landrada experienced a vision that communicated the site of the convent: while praying in a lonely place, she saw "a cross of exquisite workmanship" descend from heaven and impress itself on a stone, as if it were wax, nearby. A voice also told her that the cross was a gift for her. She became Munsterbilsen's first abbess and died there in c. 690.

== Legacy ==
Baring-Gould states that "according to popular legend", Landrada appeared to Lambert in a dream after her death, telling him to bury her in "a spot which he would find designed by the apparition of a fiery cross", which turned out to be in Wintershoven. Lambert went to Munsterbilsen, where a large crowd had gathered to celebrate her funeral rites. He told them about Landrada's demand, but they insisted that she be buried at her abbey, and he acquiesced. Three days later, Lambert ordered that a grave be dug for her at Wintershoven; by "angelic instrumentality", her body, along with a marble sarcophagus, was transported there.

Landrada's feast is celebrated at Muntersbilsen Abbey three days before it is celebrated elsewhere. In 980, her body was translated from Wintershoven to the church of St. Bavo in Ghent, where her feast is celebrated annually. Some fragments of her body were given back to the church of Wintershoven in 1624, and other portions were taken and given to the church at Munsterbilsen.

Landrada's feast day is 8 July. She is the patroness saint of Munsterbilsen and Ghent.

== Works cited ==
- Baring-Gould, Sabine (1914). The Lives of the Saints (7th ed.). London: J. Hodges. pp. 191–193.
