= Pont de Wandre =

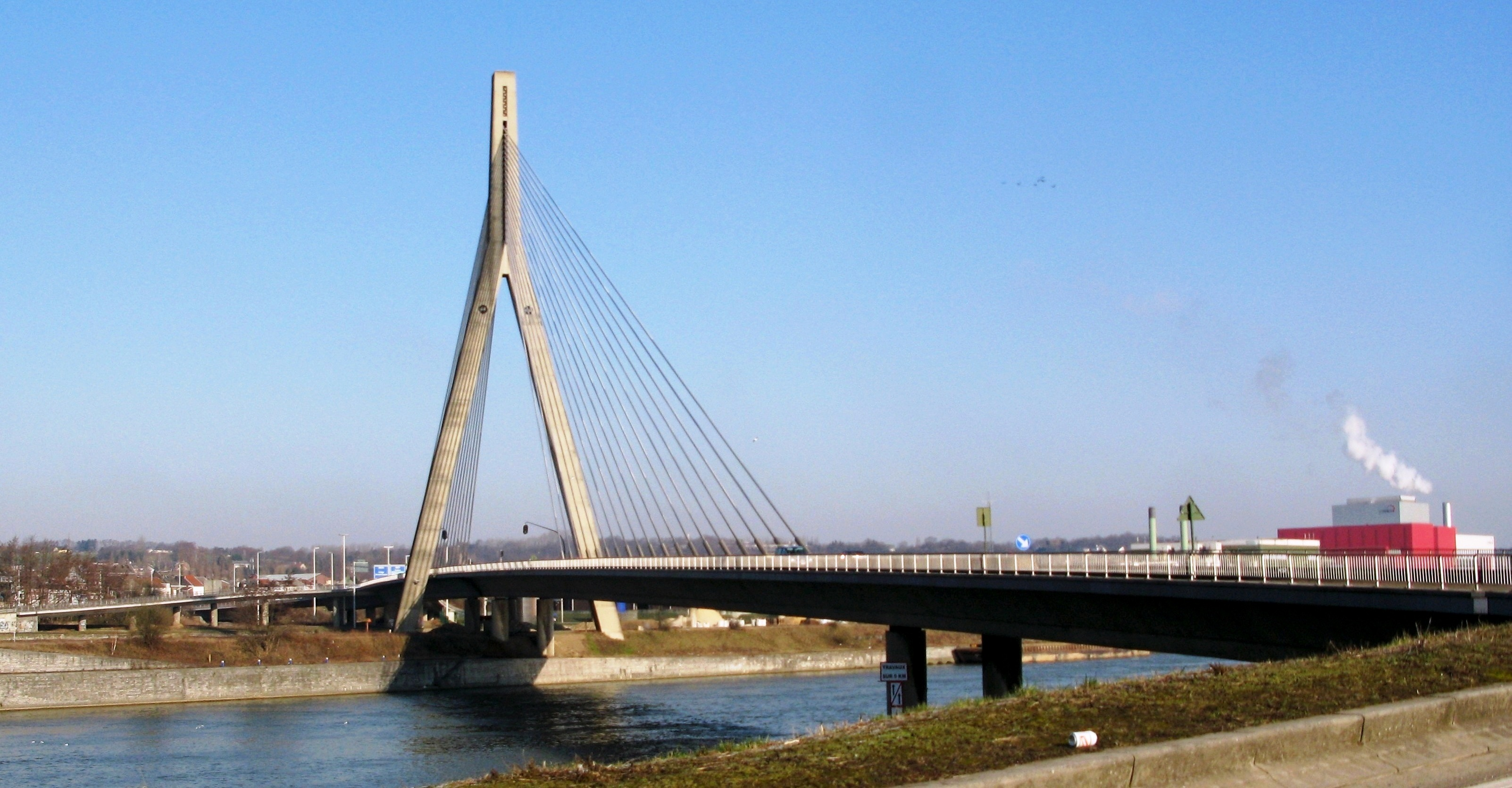
- Coordinates: 50.674072°N 5.643495°E
- Carries: Road vehicles
- Crosses: Meuse, Albert Canal
- Locale: Herstal, Liège, Belgium

Characteristics
- Design: Cable stayed bridge
- Total length: 527 m
- Height: 95.5 m
- Longest span: 168 m

History
- Designer: René Greisch

The Pont de Wandre is a single-pier cable-stayed bridge carrying the N667 road across the Albert Canal and the river Meuse between Liège (on the east side) and Herstal (on the west side), both in Belgium.

== History and description ==
From the 15th to 19th century the Meuse at Wandre was crossed by a ferry. In 1884 the first bridge crossing between Herstal and Wandre was built; it consisted of a metal bowstring bridge across the canal, a seven-arched brick-and-stone viaduct across the land between the two waterways, then a box-section rectangular girder truss bridge across the Meuse supported on three piers. Due to increased traffic caused by industrial development, a second bridge was built upstream of the first between 1935 and 1937; this was blown up by the Belgian Army in 1940. Two temporary metal pedestrian bridges of metal replaced the destroyed bridge.

Construction of replacement bridges began in 1947; a 59.4-metre-long (195 ft) bridge across the Albert Canal (le pont de l'Esparanto), and a three-span concrete bridge across the Meuse of total length 190 m; the new construction was officially opened in 1948.

An increase in traffic on the Albert Canal during the 1970s necessitated its expansion for larger vessels, requiring the widening of the channel from 35 to 85 m; as a result this expansion also required the construction of a new bridge.

Work to construct a new bridge to replace the postwar bridges began in 1985; the bridge was officially opened 16 June 1989, at a cost of 508 million Belgian francs. It connects suburbs Wandre and Herstal of Liege, crossing the Meuse and Albert Canals, the main support stands on the isthmus between the Meuse and Albert canal.

The total length of the bridge, including the approach sections, is c. 527 m; the main cable-stayed spans are 144 m and 168 m. The inverted Y-shaped concrete main support is 88.5 m high, and supports a 22-metre-wide (72 ft) road deck.
