= Beverst =

Village in Belgium

Coordinates: 50°53′29″N 5°28′27″E

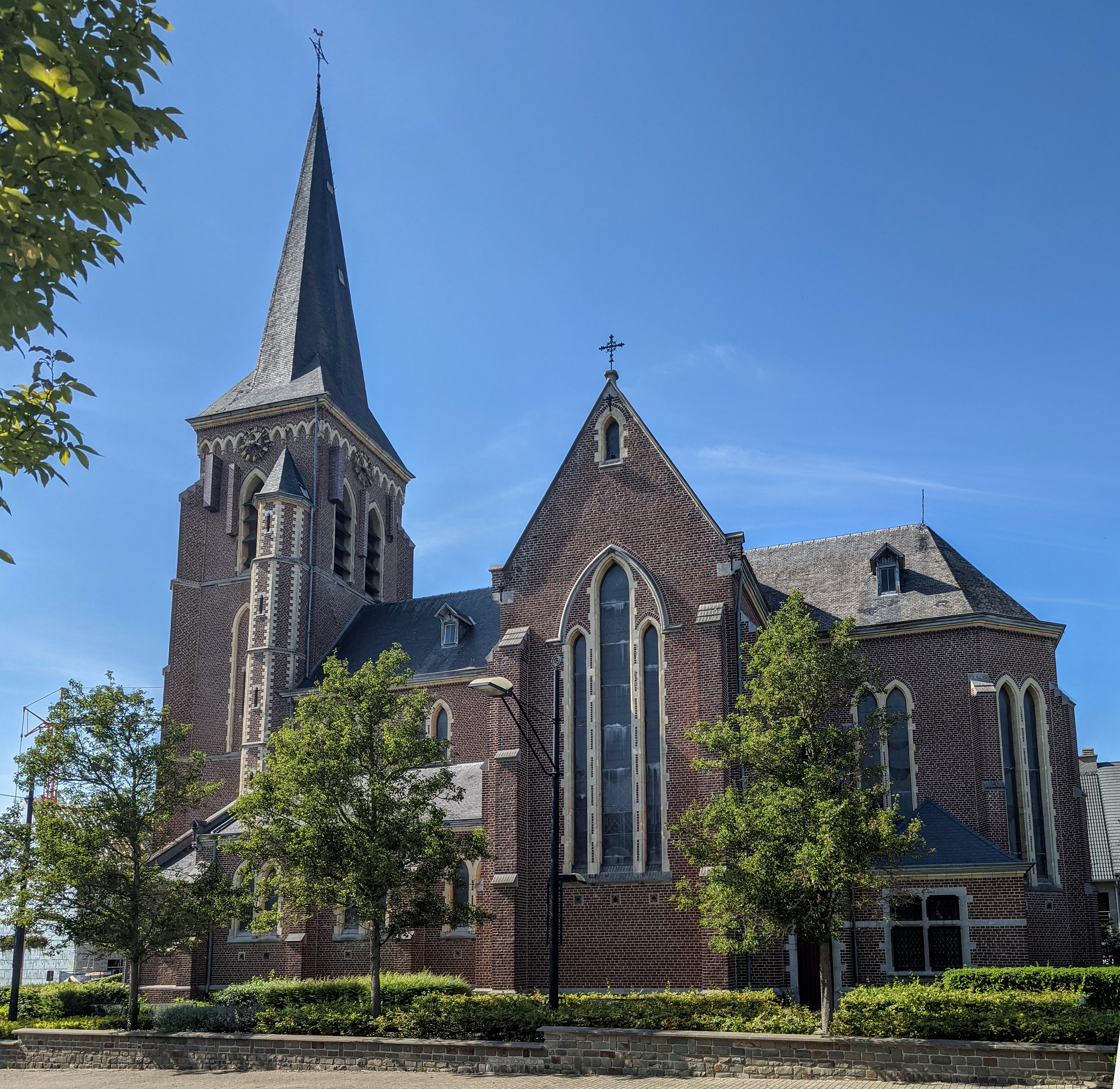
Sint-Gertrudiskerk in Beverest

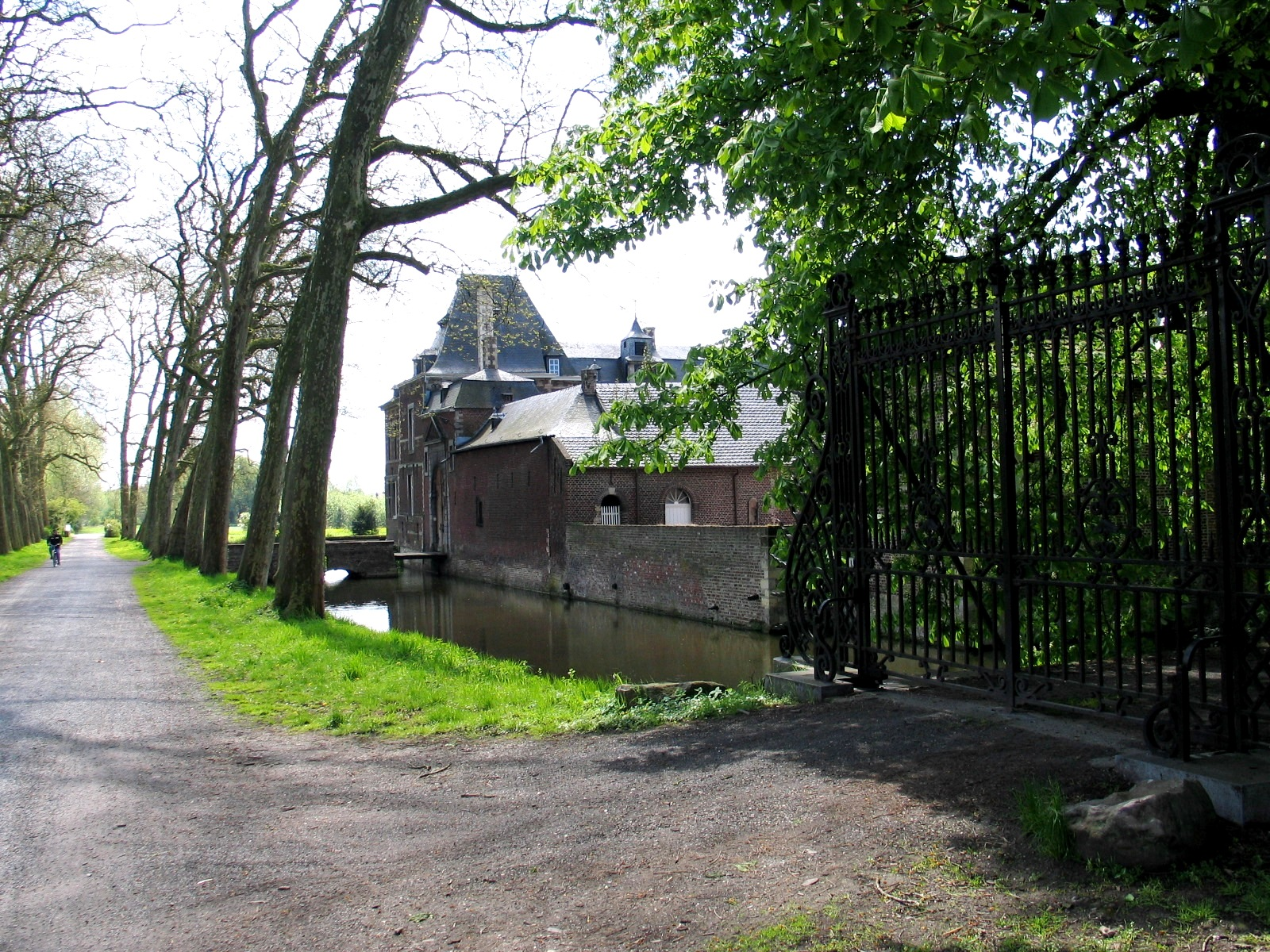
Schoonbeek castle is located in Beverst

Beverst (Bjöves) is a village in the Belgian province of Limburg and a sub-municipality of Bilzen. It was an independent municipality until the 1977 fusion of the Belgian municipalities. It measures 983 ha and had 3458 inhabitants in 1976.

== History ==
Archaeological finds testify that people lived here already during the prehistoric times. The name is of Celtic origin and Beverest was first mentioned as a settlement in 1314.

Beverst was part of the lordship of Oreye, which itself was a fief of the County of Loon. The earliest known lord of Beverst was Jan de Velroux, who officially took possession of the lordship in 1420. Over time, the fief passed through several families: first the de Velroux family (also known as de Nandrin), then the Hoen van Hoensbroeck family in 1434, and later the de Geloes family in 1588. In 1683, Willem Frans de Geloes sold the lordship to Edmond Godfried Huyn, Baron of Bocholtz and Land Commander of Alden Biesen. From that point on, it belonged to the Teutonic Order.

Judicial authority at the local level in Beverst was held by the local bench of aldermen, known as the 's Graevenbanck. This body was partially appointed by the Count of Loon and partially by the Lord of Oreye. Middle and higher jurisdiction was partly exercised by the inner bench of Bilzen, which followed Liège law, while the hamlets of Laar, Holt, and Schoonbeek fell under the outer bench of Bilzen, which applied the law of Loon. The municipality was governed by two mayors, elected annually.

On the present-day territory of Beverst, several large feudal estates and farms once stood. The most significant was Schoonbeek, which still has a moated castle. The feudal estate of Grotenrock was also located there. Other notable farms included Coum (now gone), Damreis, which bordered Coum, and the likely moated farmstead Schuylenborg, situated on the boundary with Hoeselt. Schuylenborg was first mentioned in 1578 but has since completely disappeared.

As early as the 8th century, there was a chapel in Beverst, classified as a quarta capella—a subordinate chapel—under the church of Hoeselt, which itself became independent from the Tongeren parish during that century. The chapel did not have the rights to perform baptisms or administer the last sacraments. It was dedicated to Saint Gertrude of Nivelles. The tithes belonged to the Chapter of Our Lady in Huy, while the right of patronage lay with the parish priest of Hoeselt. When the new deanery of Hasselt was established in 1589, Beverst became part of it, even though it remained a filial church of Hoeselt. In 1801, the chapel came under the parish of Munsterbilzen, in 1805 under that of Bilzen, and finally, in 1839, it became an independent parish.

In the 17th century, Beverst suffered from plundering by Croatian and Dutch troops. In 1653, it was again plundered by soldiers of the Duke of Lorraine, and it endured further troop occupations during the early and mid-18th century.

During the French occupation, Beverst was first incorporated into the canton of Genk, and a year later into the canton of Bilzen. In 1878, the hamlets of Laar, Holt, and Schoonbeek were separated from Bilzen’s territory and annexed to Beverst.

Until the 20th century, Beverst remained a typical agricultural village of the Vochtig-Haspengouw region, built in the linear street-village style along the Hasselt-Bilzen road. Farms were scattered along secondary roads or loosely grouped in hamlets. From the 20th century, Beverst has evolved into a commuter town. While much new construction has taken place, the original village structure is still largely recognizable. The building of social housing estates in Schoonbeek contributed to population growth and in-migration.

Outside the village center, located along the Hasselt-Bilzen road and featuring the church and several brick houses and farms from the late 19th and early 20th centuries, the older buildings mainly consist of timber-framed farms with separate buildings, along with a number of enclosed brick farms from the 19th century. A significant portion of the northern part of Beverst is covered by forest.

== Places of interest ==
- Schoonbeek castle is located in Beverst.
