= Genenbos Bridge =

Genenbos Bridge Brug bij Lummen
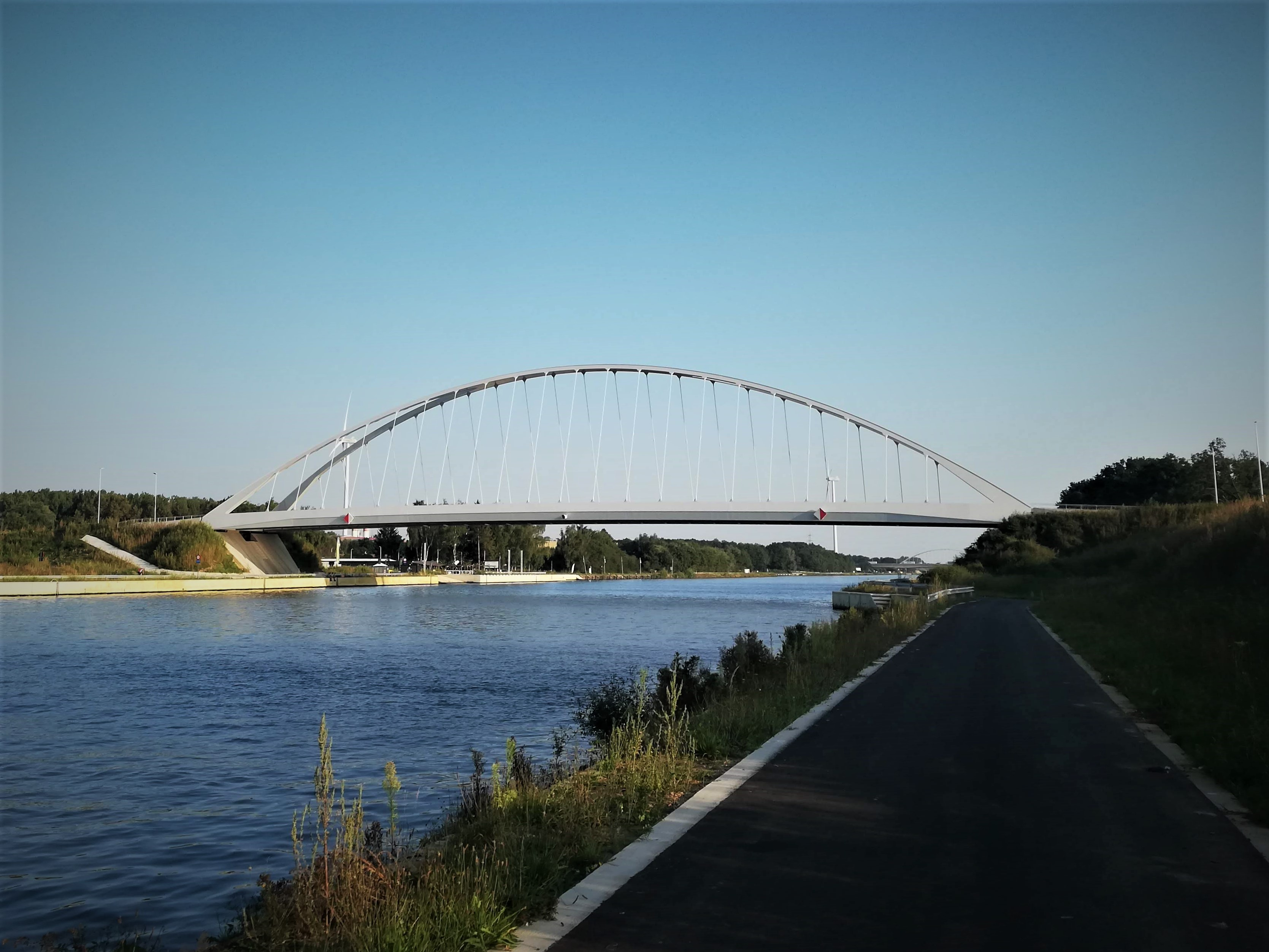
- Coordinates: 51°00′55″N 5°13′59″E
- Crosses: Albert Canal
- Locale: Genenbos, Lummen, Belgium

History
- Opening: 4th bridge: 12 March 2021

Location
- Interactive map of Genenbos Bridge

The Genenbos Bridge (Dutch: Brug bij Lummen) (BR24) is a bridge over the Albert Canal (at km 63.675, measured from the beginning of the Albert Canal in Luik) in the Belgian city of Lummen (in the hamlet of Genenbos).

== History ==
=== Second bridge (over the Albert Canal) (around 1939) ===
At the beginning of World War II, on May 10, 1940, German tanks approached the bridge from Zolder, where it was blown up by the Belgian engineers along with the Viversel bridge.

=== Third bridge (1959) ===
The third bridge was a concrete girder bridge built according to the plans of May 1959.
