= Alden Biesen Castle =

16th-century castle in Belgium

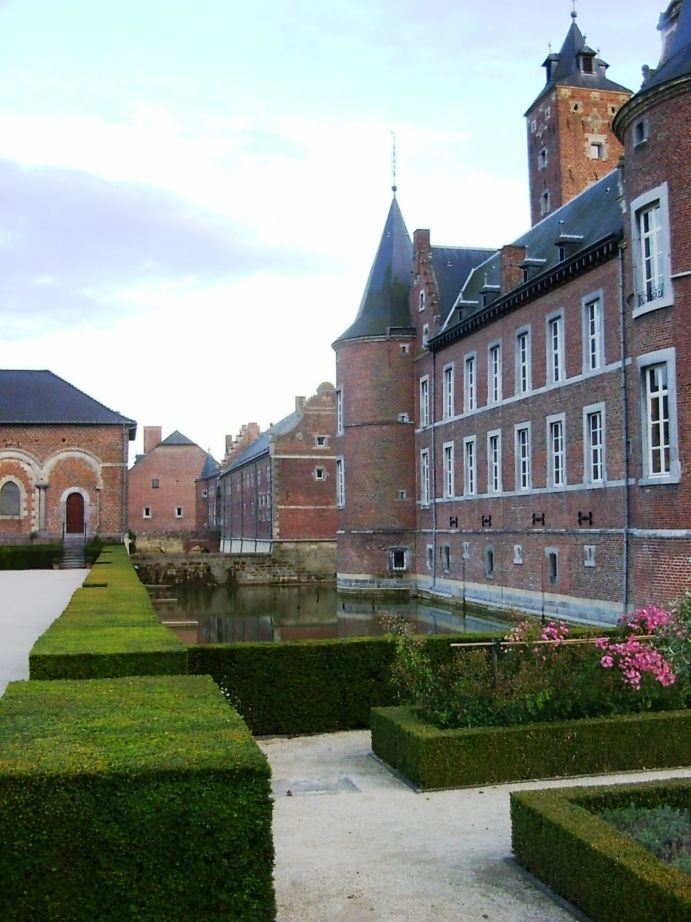
- View from within the French garden

- Location within Belgium

General information
- Architectural style: Classicism
- Location: Rijkhoven, Belgium
- Coordinates: 50.8417°N 5.5206°E
- Construction started: 16th century
- Completed: 18th century
- Owner: Flemish Government

Website
- www.alden-biesen.be

Alden Biesen is a 16th-century castle in the small village of Rijkhoven, municipality of Bilzen, province of Limburg, Belgium.

== Present day ==
The castle is used today as a cultural centre and conference centre. Festivals including the Scottish weekend and the International Story Festival are held there. "European Classes" are also held there to foster international learning and student collaboration. The first ever RSPBA Major Pipe Band Championship held outside the UK was the European Pipe Band Championships held there in September 2003.

In addition to the moated castle, the complex contains a church and gardens.

== History ==
The knights of the Teutonic Order founded the Landcommanderij Alden Biesen ("commandery of Alden Biesen") in the 11th century, but the current buildings were constructed between the 16th and 18th centuries. It was the headquarters of a bailiwick or province of the Teutonic Order in the region of the Maas and Rhine. On 8 March 1971 the building burnt down; it was acquired by the government, and restored.

== See also ==
- List of castles in Belgium

== Sources ==
- Landcommanderij Alden Biesen website
