= Rijkhoven =

- Village
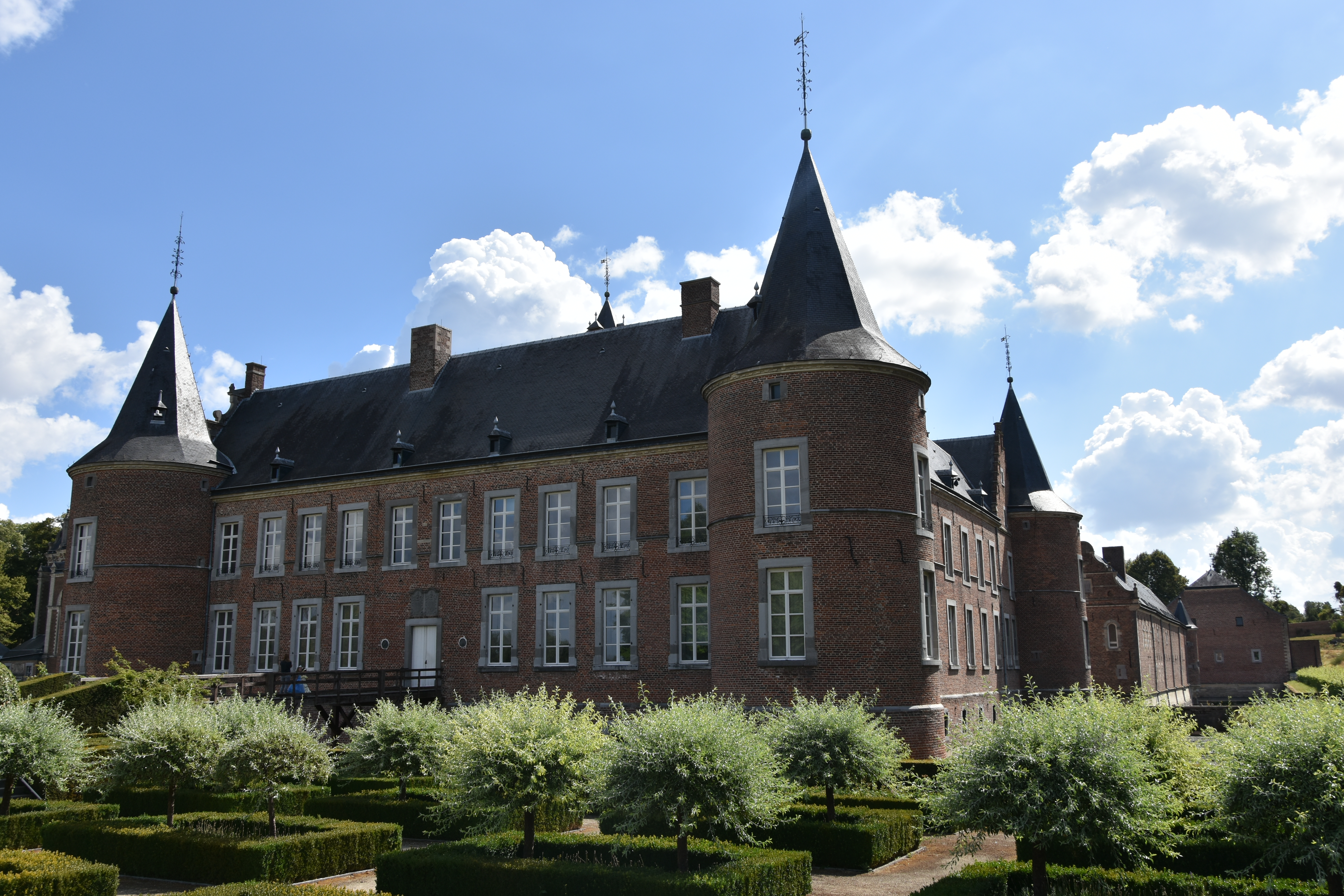
- Alden Biesen Castle

- Location in Belgium
- Country: Belgium
- Community: Flemish Community
- Province: Limburg
- Municipality: Bilzen

Area
  - Total: 4.71 km^{2} (1.82 sq mi)

Population (2021)
  - Total: 1,370
  - Density: 291/km^{2} (753/sq mi)
- Time zone: CET

Rijkhoven is a village in the Bilzen municipality of the Limburg province in the Flemish Community of Belgium.

== History ==
The village was first mentioned in 1076 as Rudenchoven. It used to be part of the County of Loon. In 1220 the chapel of Alden Biesen was given to the Teutonic Order who establish a commandery. In 1870, Rijkhoven became an independent municipality. In 1971, the municipality merged with Kleine- en Grote-Spouwen into Spouwen. In 1977, Spouwen merged into Bilzen during the larger fusion of the Belgian municipalities.

The Alden Biesen Castle is located near the village, and was the commandery of the Teutonic Order. The current building has been constructed between the mid-16th century and the late 18th century.

== Notable people ==
- Johan Capiot (1964), road racing cyclist.
- Steve Stevaert (1954–2015), former Governor of Limburg.
