= Antoing Bridge =

Coordinates: 50.5592°N 3.4349°E

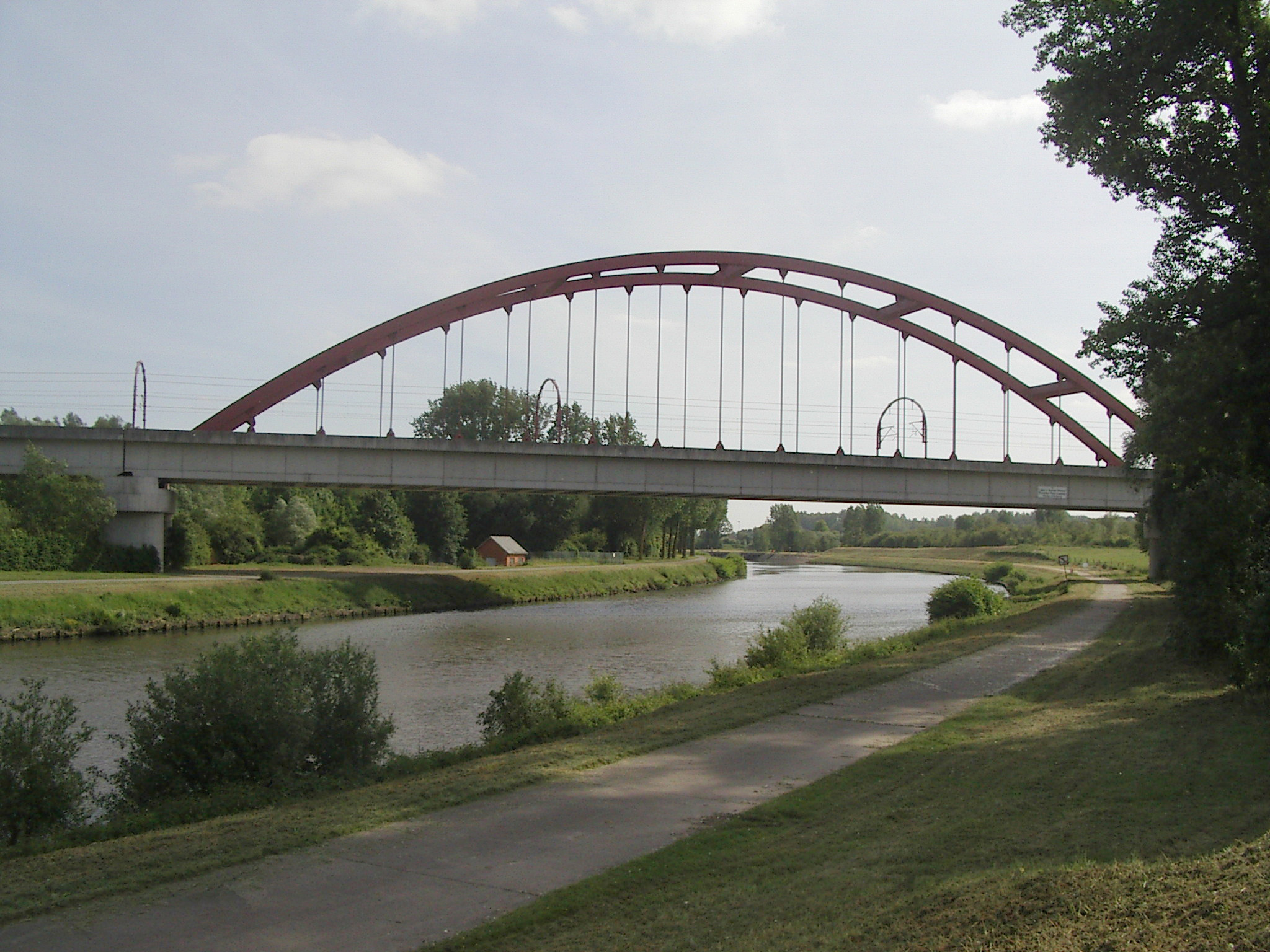
The bridge seen in 2011.

The Antoing Bridge is a railway bridge over the river Scheldt, located near Antoing, Belgium, on the HSL 1 line between Paris and Brussels.

== Technical Details ==
The bridge is made of U-shaped sections with multi-span simply supported prestressed concrete girders with spans of 50m. The bridge was built between 1993 and 1995 at a cost of €10.00 million.
