= Eigenbilzen =

- Village and former municipality
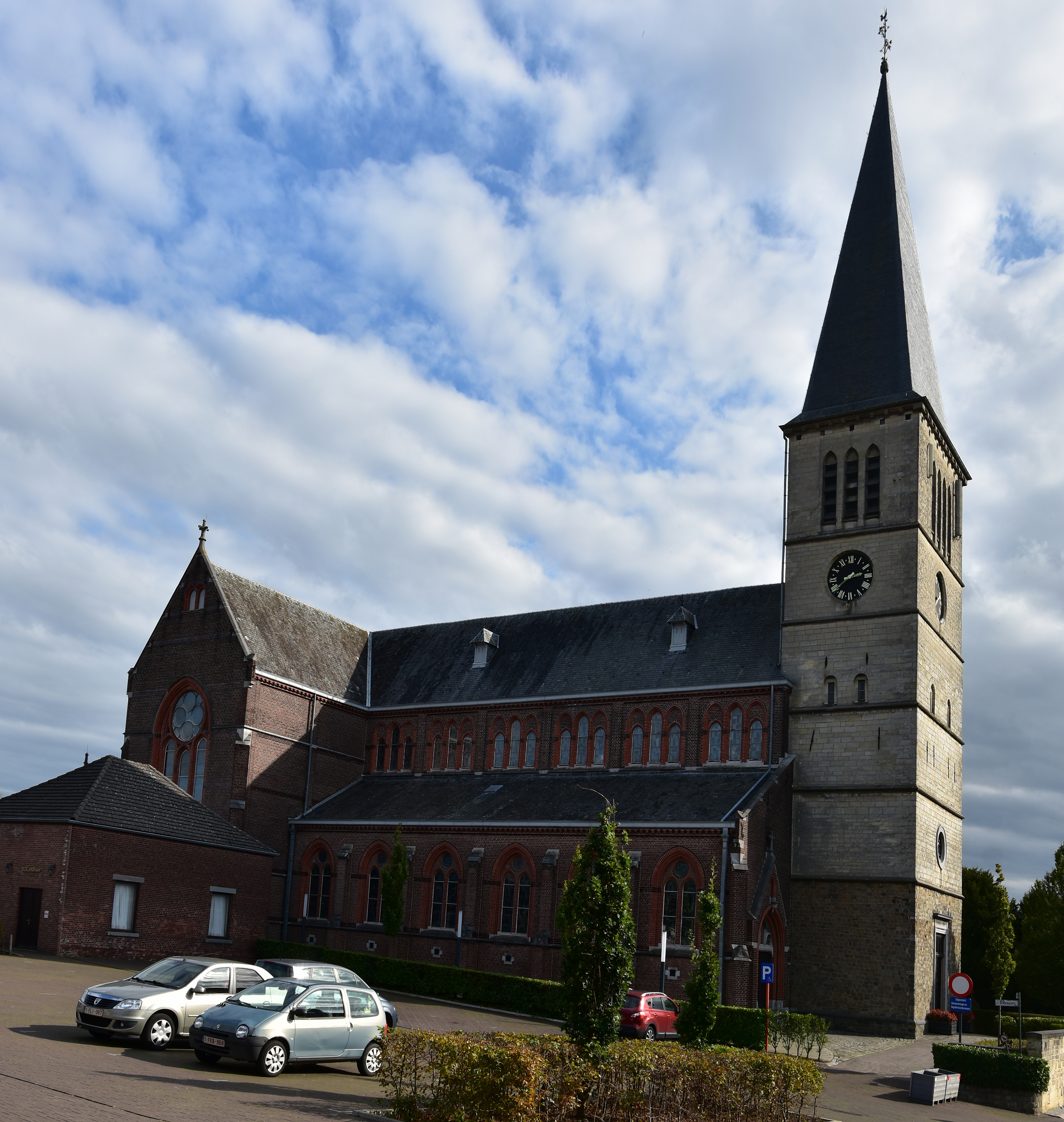
- Saint-Ursula Church

- Location in Belgium
- Coordinates: 50.875556°N 5.5750°E
- Country: Belgium
- Community: Flemish Community
- Province: Limburg
- Municipality: Bilzen

Area
  - Total: 8.23 km^{2} (3.18 sq mi)

Population (2013)
  - Total: 2,317
  - Density: 282/km^{2} (729/sq mi)
- Time zone: CET

Eigenbilzen is a village and former municipality in the Bilzen municipality of the Limburg province in the Flemish Community of Belgium. Eigenbilzen was an independent municipality until 1977 when it merged into Bilzen during the fusion of the Belgian municipalities.

== History ==
The village was first mentioned in 1096 as Eigenbilesen. Prehistoric and Roman remains have been discovered in the area. In 1871 a tumulus was discovered at the Kannesberg which dated from 400 B.C. Furthermore three Roman villas, and a Roman cemetery were discovered. The Roman road connecting Tongeren to Maastricht used to pass through the village.

Zangerheide Castle was built in 1423. In 1680, the family of de Heusch de Zangerye became manor of the village, and resided in the castle. The castle was torn down in the early 19th century.

In 1864, the Hasselt-Maastricht railway was opened with a station for Eigenbilzen. The railway line was closed for passengers in 1954, and goods in 1992. In 1977, the municipality merged into Bilzen.

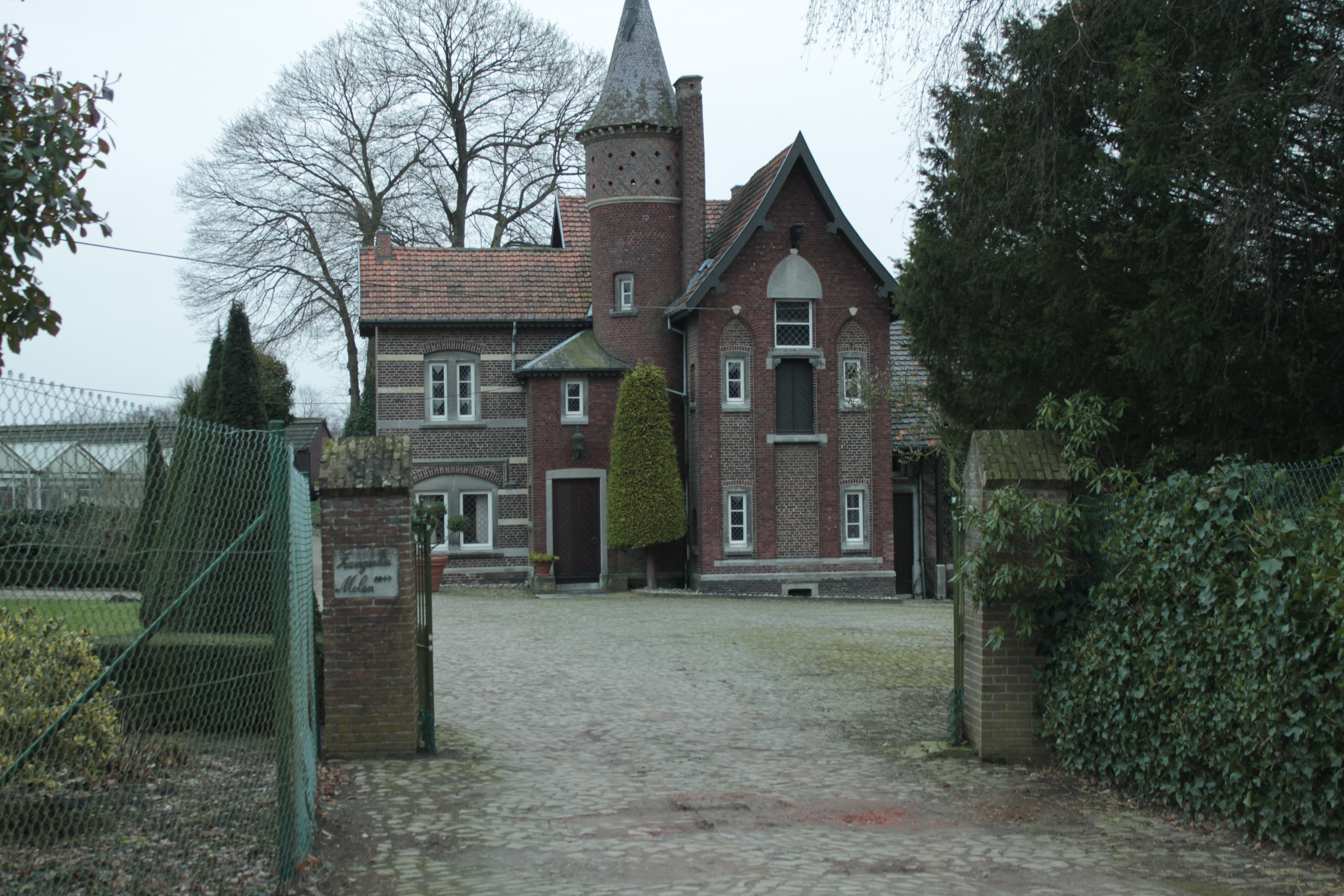
Zangerheimolen

Near the village is the Zangerheimolen, a former overshot water mill. The original mill dated from before 1390. The mill was in use as a gristmill and sawing mill. The current building dates from 1865, and was transformed into a residential house in 1925.

== Nature ==
Eigenbilzen is located on the edge of the Campine region. About half the area used to be covered in heath, but in the early 19th century much of the heath turned into a forest. De Hoefaert is a nature reserve north of the Albert Canal and an important habit for songbirds and birds of prey.

== Notable people ==
- Guido Brepoels (1961), football player
- Gerty Christoffels (1958-2020), television presenter
- Guy Swennen (1956), politician and former Senator
