= Bilzen =

- City and municipality
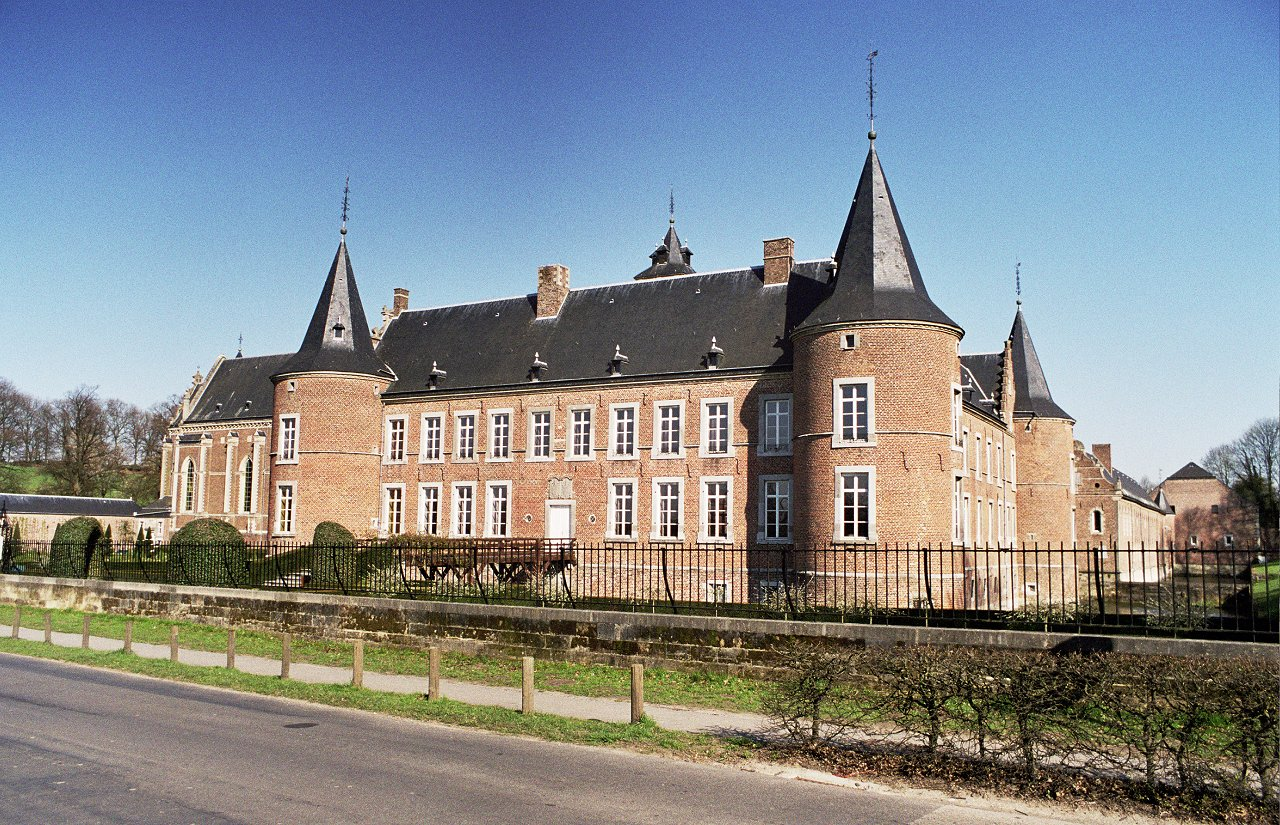
- Alden Biesen Castle

- Flag Coat of arms

- Location of Bilzen in Limburg
- Interactive map of Bilzen
- Location in Belgium
- Coordinates: 50°52′N 05°31′E
- Country: Belgium
- Community: Flemish Community
- Region: Flemish Region
- Province: Limburg
- Arrondissement: Tongeren

Government
  - Mayor: Bruno Steegen (Open VLD, Beter Bilzen)
  - Governing parties: Beter Bilzen, TOB (CD&V)

Population (2018-01-01)
  - Total: 32,318
- Postal codes: 3740, 3742, 3746
- NIS code: 73006
- Area codes: 089
- Website: www.bilzen.be

Bilzen (Dutch pronunciation: [ˈbɪlzə(n)]) is a former municipality and city located in the Belgian province of Limburg. On 1 January 2025, the municipality merged with Hoeselt to form the new municipality Bilzen-Hoeselt.

In 2021, Bilzen had a total population of 32,536. The total area is 75.90 km^{2} which gives a population density of 426 inhabitants per km^{2}.

Bilzen consists of the city of Bilzen and the following villages: Beverst, Eigenbilzen, Grote-Spouwen, Hees, Hoelbeek, Kleine-Spouwen, Martenslinde, Mopertingen, Munsterbilzen, Rijkhoven, Rosmeer, and Waltwilder. In 1977 they all became part of the municipality Bilzen because of the fusion of municipalities.

Cities in Bilzen's neighbourhood are all within a distance of some 10 to 15 kilometers: to its north is Genk, to its east Maastricht (Netherlands), to its south Tongeren, and to its north-west Diepenbeek.

From 1965 to 1981 Bilzen hosted Jazz Bilzen, an annual multi-day open air jazz and rock festival. In its time Jazz Bilzen was the most important Belgian festival. Artists that performed, among many others, included: Humble Pie, The Moody Blues, Deep Purple, Black Sabbath, Humble Pie, The Kinks, The Troggs, Procol Harum, Golden Earring, Rod Stewart, Status Quo, Lou Reed, Aerosmith, AC/DC, The Cure, Toots Thielemans, Keith Jarrett and John McLaughlin. From the 1980s onwards, the festival was superseded by Torhout-Werchter, which has now become Rock Werchter.

== History ==
For over 300 years, Bilzen was part of the County of Loon (French: comté de Looz).

== Places of interest ==
- Alden Biesen Castle in the village of Rijkhoven.
- Munsterbilzen Abbey

== Born in Bilzen ==
- Bert Appermont (born 1973), composer, conductor
- Elke Clijsters (born 1985), tennis player and younger sister of Kim Clijsters.
- Kim Clijsters (born 1983), tennis player.
- Valérie Courtois (born 1990), volleyball player
- Lisa del Bo (born 1961), singer
- Camille Huysmans (1871–1968), politician, Prime Minister (August 1946 – 1947); mayor of Antwerp (1933–1946).
- Jelle Vossen (born 1989), football player
- Thibaut Courtois (born 1992) football player

== Gallery ==
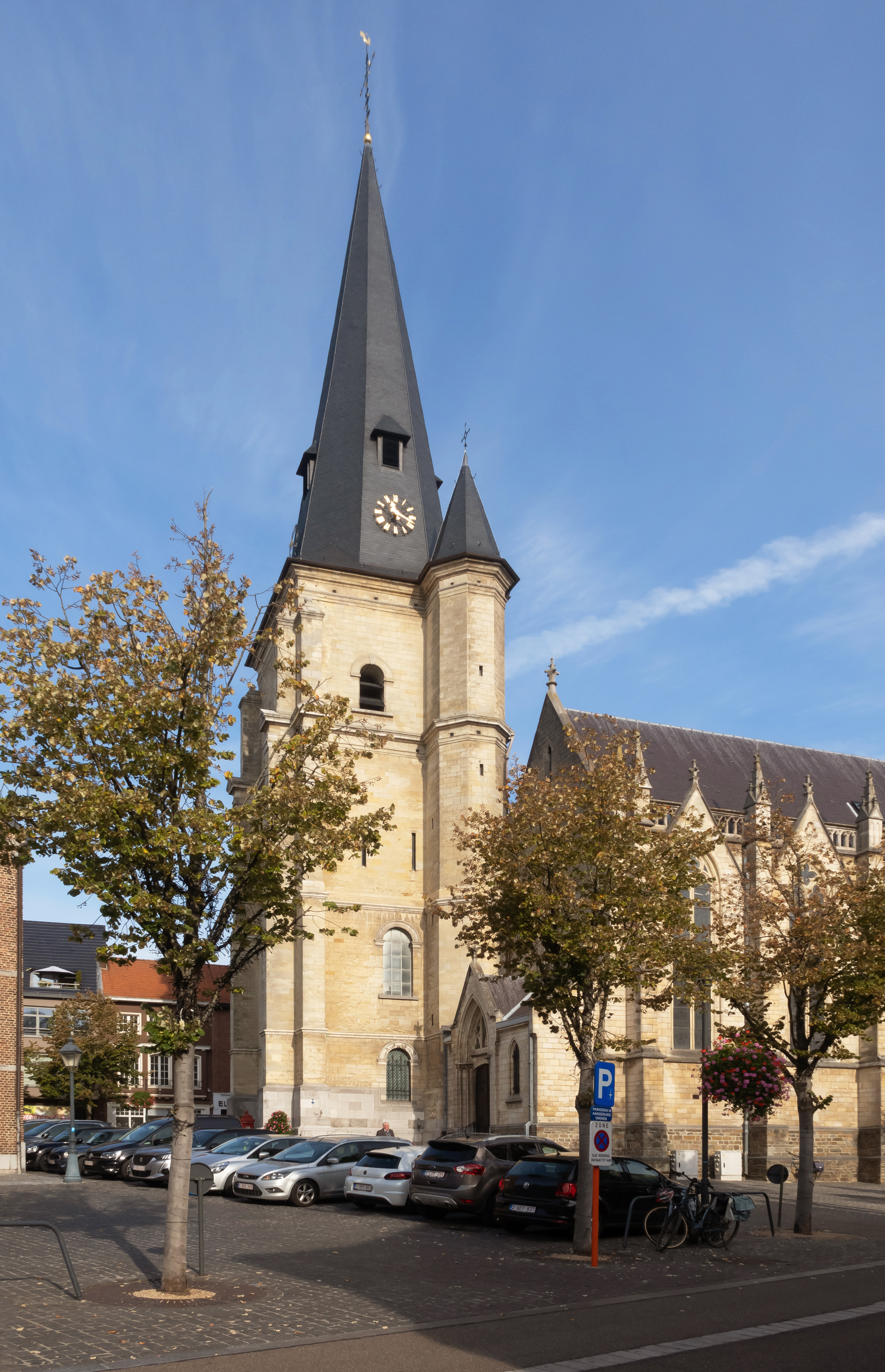
Bilzen, church: parochiekerk Sint-Mauritius

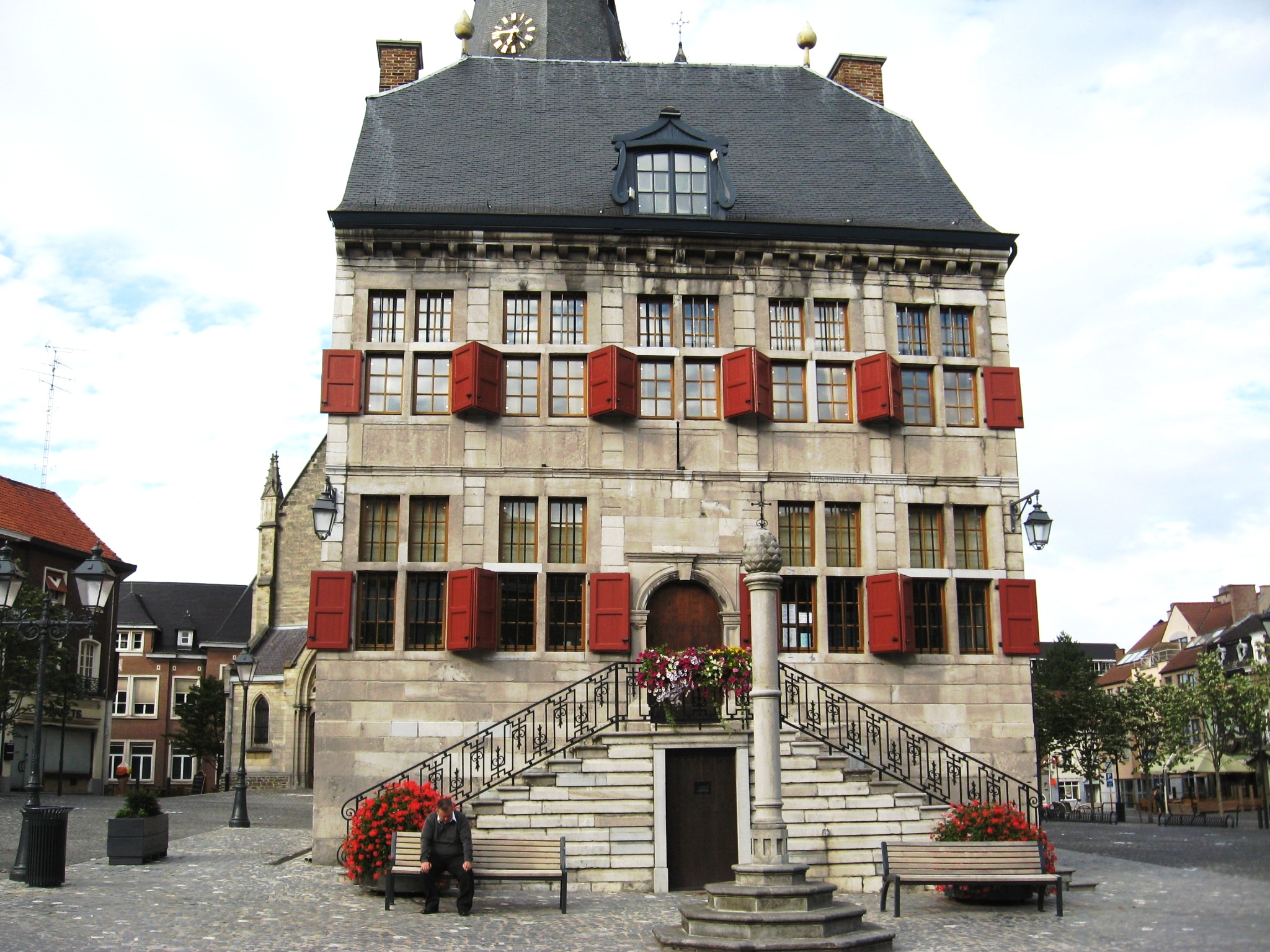
Bilzen, townhall

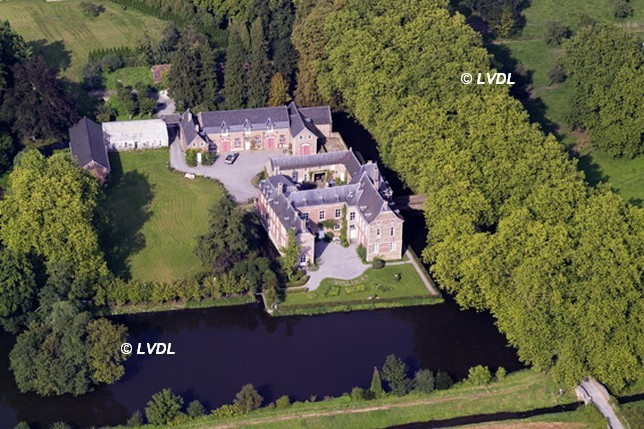
Beverst, Schoonbeek castle

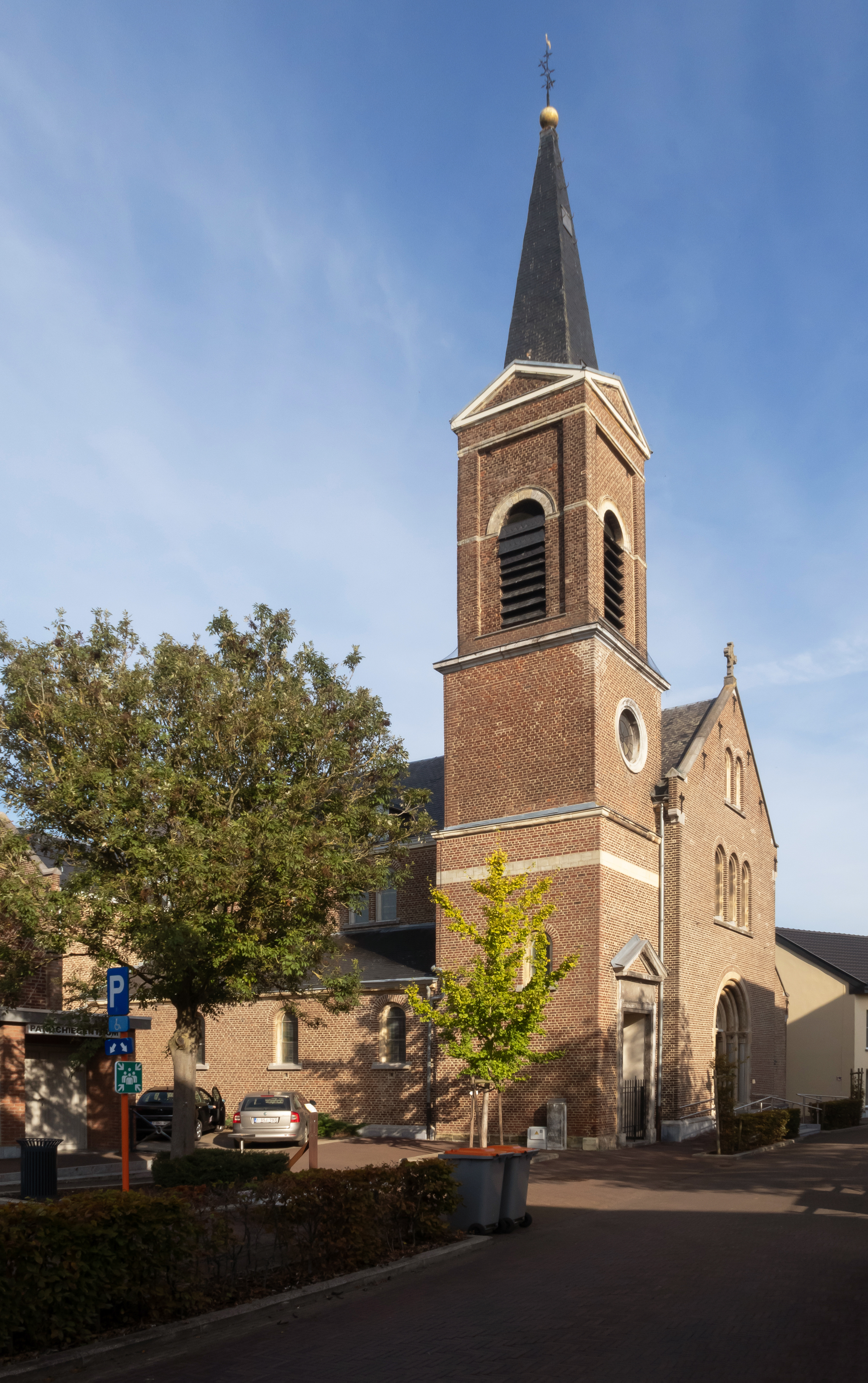
Mopertingen, church: parochiekerk Sint-Catharina

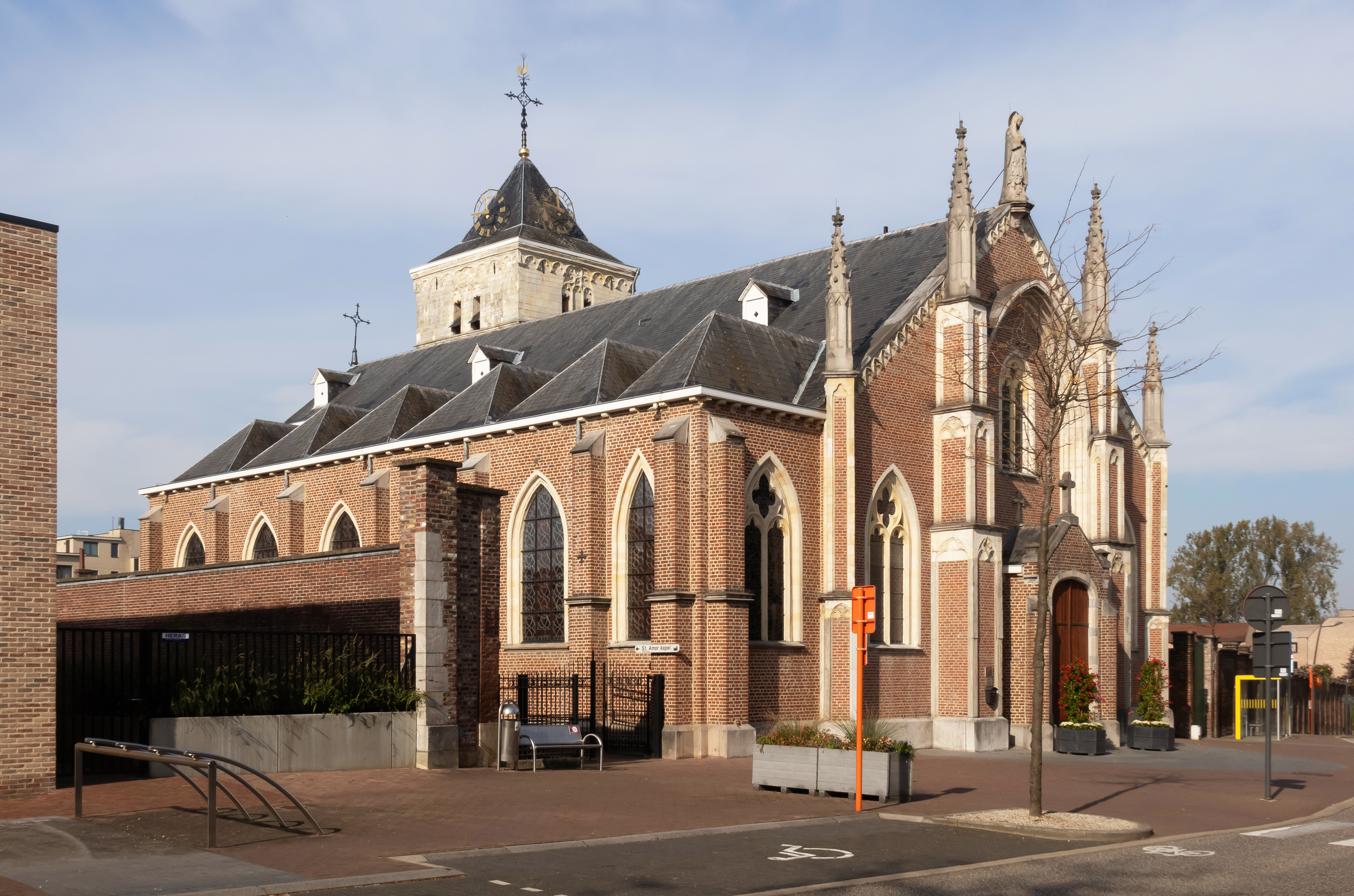
Munsterbilzen, church: parochiekerk Onze-Lieve-Vrouw-ten-Hemelopneming

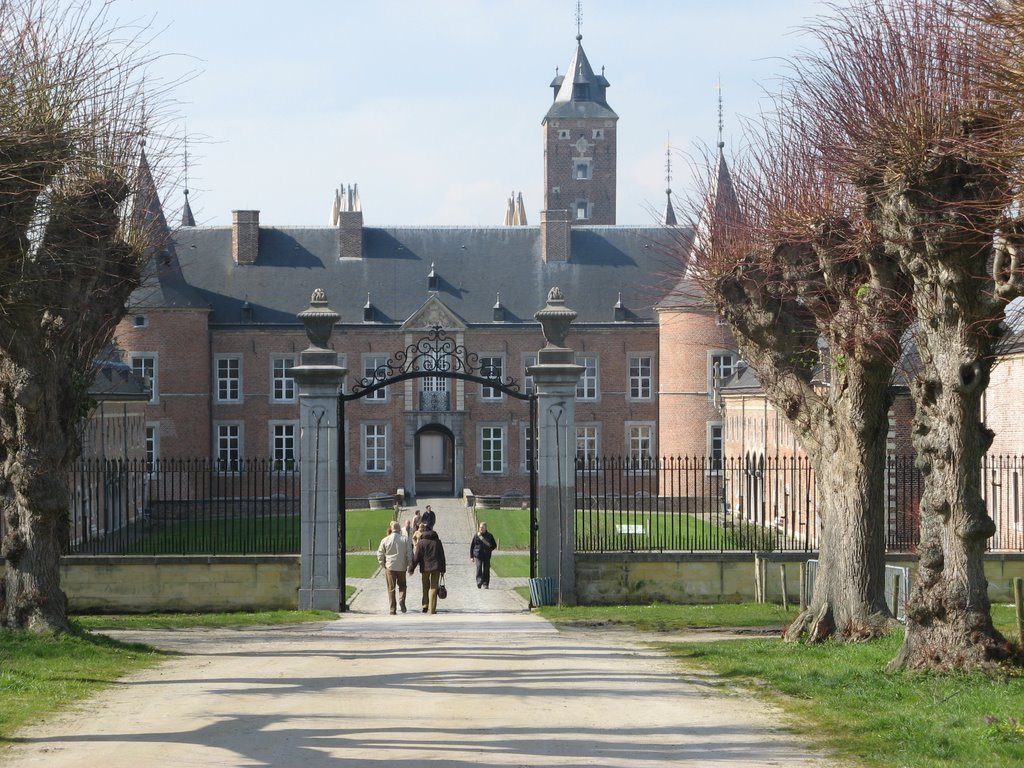
Rijkhoven, Alden Biesen commandry
