= N2 road (Belgium) =

Road in Belgium

Coordinates: 50.94677°N 4.98225°E

National Route 2
- Dutch: Nationale Weg 2 French: Route nationale 2
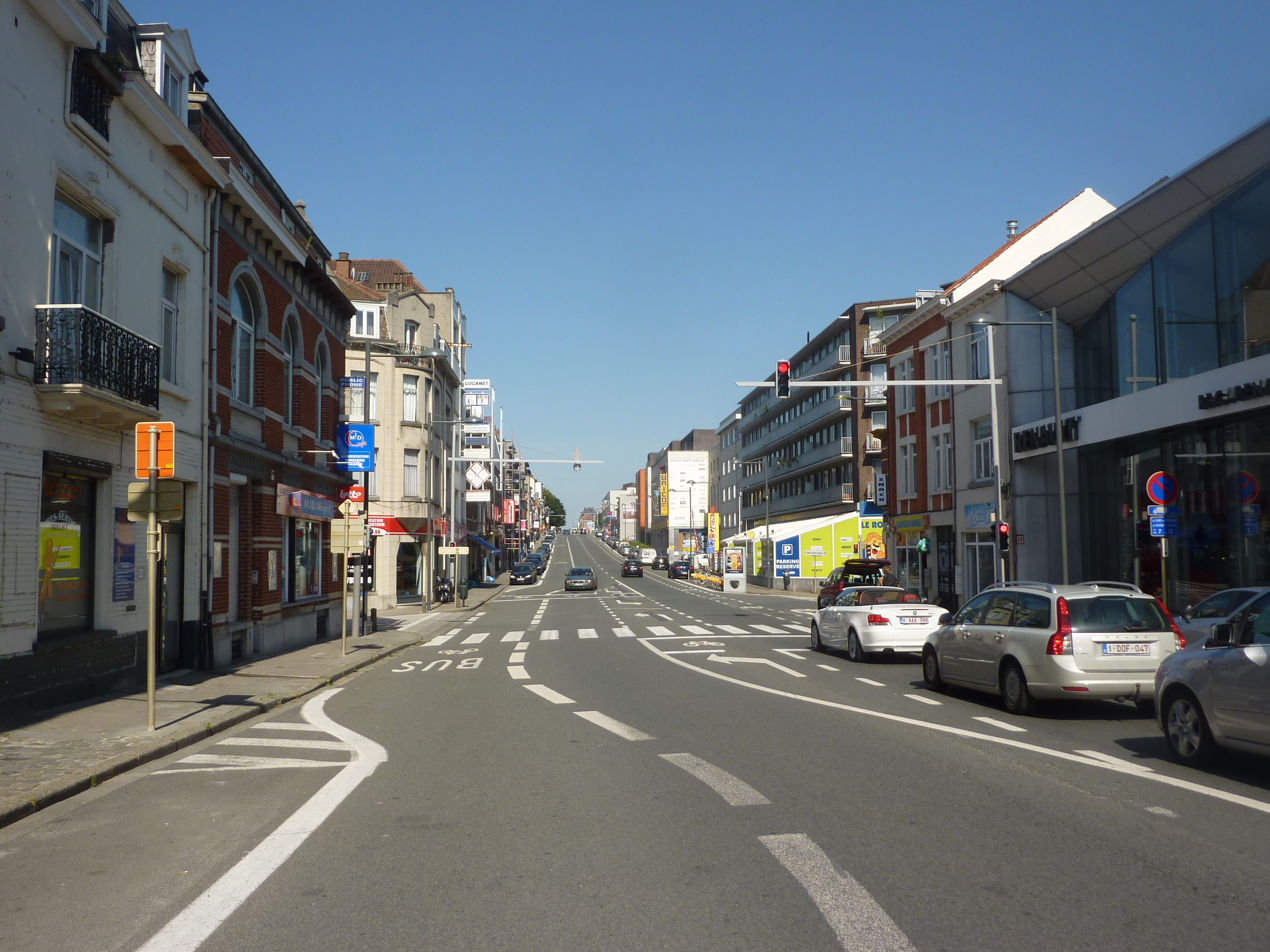
- The Chaussée de Louvain in Schaerbeek.

Route information
- Length: 95.079 km (59.079 mi)

Major junctions
- South end: R20 in Brussels
- North end: P 589 to Maastricht

Location
- Country: Belgium
- Regions: Brussels, Flanders
- Major cities: Brussels, Leuven, Diest, Hasselt, Bilzen

Highway system
- Highways of Belgium; Motorways; National Roads

The N2 road in Belgium is a road connecting Brussels and Maastricht passing Leuven, Diest and Hasselt. It starts in Brussels at the Madou crossroad on the small ring, heading northeast as the Chaussée de Louvain/Leuvensesteenweg, which crosses the municipalities of Saint-Josse-ten-Noode, City of Brussels, Schaerbeek, Evere and Woluwe-Saint-Lambert in Brussels, and then enters Flanders via the municipality of Zaventem, Flemish Brabant.

When the road enters the municipality of Herent it is named Brusselsesteenweg up to Leuven. When it leaves Leuven, the road is named Diestsesteenweg as it leads to Diest. It is then named successively Staatsbaan, Leuvensesteenweg, Diestsesteenweg, Staatsbaan, Leuvensesteenweg and Eduard Robeynslaan. When leaving Diest and entering Halen, the road enters the province of Limburg. At this point, the road (named Halensebaan) crosses the European route E314. The subsequent names of the road are: Staatsbaan, Grote Baan, Diestsesteenweg, Steenweg, Diestersteenweg, Kuringersteenweg. Just before entering Hasselt, the road crosses the European route E313. When leaving Hasselt, it is named Diepenbekerweg, then Steenweg, Kapelstraat, Wijkstraat, Grendelbaan, Tipstraat, Beverststraat, Holt, Hasseltstestraat, Brugstraat, Maastrichterstraat, Bilzerbaan and Tweede Carabinierslaan. It then enters the Netherlands.

The road crosses in total 19 municipalities. 5 in the Brussels-capital Region, 8 in the province of Flemish Brabant and 6 in the province of Limburg. Full municipality list is available below, main municipalities are in bold.

Regions	Provinces	Municipalities	Population	Length of N2 (km)
Brussels Capital Region	/	**City of Brussels**	188737	0.5
Brussels Capital Region	/	Saint-Josse-ten-Noode	26965	1.1
Brussels Capital Region	/	Schaerbeek	130690	1.8
Brussels Capital Region	/	Evere	43608	1.4
Brussels Capital Region	/	Woluwe-Saint-Lambert	58541	0.3
Flanders	Flemish Brabant	Zaventem	35916	6.7
Flanders	Flemish Brabant	Kortenberg	20462	5.8
Flanders	Flemish Brabant	Herent	22430	5.4
Flanders	Flemish Brabant	**Leuven**	102236	7.4
Flanders	Flemish Brabant	Lubbeek	14776	7.3
Flanders	Flemish Brabant	Tielt-Winge	11037	7.9
Flanders	Flemish Brabant	Bekkevoort	6459	6.2
Flanders	Flemish Brabant	**Diest**	24516	5.5
Flanders	Limburg	Halen	9475	3.3
Flanders	Limburg	Herk-de-Stad	12756	7.1
Flanders	Limburg	**Hasselt**	79524	12.2
Flanders	Limburg	Diepenbeek	19241	6.2
Flanders	Limburg	**Bilzen**	32455	12.1
Flanders	Limburg	Lanaken	26172	3.2

== Junction list ==
Province	Municipality	Section	Junction	Eastbound destinations	Westbound destinations
(European Union) (Belgium) Brussels capital region	City of Brussels	Brussels - Woluwe-Saint-Lambert	Brussels (188.737 inh.) R20 Brussels inner ring road	Leuven	Brussels
(European Union) (Belgium) Brussels capital region	Saint-Josse-ten-Noode	Brussels - Woluwe-Saint-Lambert	Saint-Josse-ten-Noode (26.965 inh.)	Leuven	Brussels
(European Union) (Belgium) Brussels capital region	Schaerbeek	Brussels - Woluwe-Saint-Lambert	R21 Atomium, Schaerbeek, Evere, Etterbeek	Leuven	Brussels
(European Union) (Belgium) Brussels capital region	Evere	Brussels - Woluwe-Saint-Lambert	/	Leuven	Brussels
(European Union) (Belgium) Brussels capital region	Woluwe-Saint-Lambert	Brussels - Woluwe-Saint-Lambert	/	Leuven	Brussels
(European Union) (Belgium) Flanders Flemish Brabant	Zaventem	Zaventem - Leuven	Sint-Stevens-Woluwe (9.432 inh.) R22 Zaventem, Brussels Airport, Auderghem, Brussels Ring road N262 Zaventem, Brussels Airport Nossegem (3.282 inh.) N227 Wezembeek-Oppem, Steenokkerzeel, Mechelen	Leuven	Brussels
(European Union) (Belgium) Flanders Flemish Brabant	Kortenberg	Zaventem - Leuven	Kortenberg (20.462 inh.) Schoonaarde	Leuven	Brussels
(European Union) (Belgium) Flanders Flemish Brabant	Herent	Zaventem - Leuven	Veltem-Beisem (4.754 inh.) Winksele (4.757 inh.) 17 (Winksele) E314 Leuven, Brussels (E40), Hasselt, Genk, Liège (E40), Germany (Aachen)	Leuven	Brussels
(European Union) (Belgium) Flanders Flemish Brabant	Leuven	Leuven	R23, Leuven ring road Leuven, Brussels, Tervuren, Wavre, Namur, Tienen, Diest, Aarschot, Mechelen Start of concurrency with R23 N26 Herent, Mechelen Leuven-Mechelen Canal N19 Rotselaar, Aarschot Leuven (102.236 inh.) End of concurrency with R23 R23, Leuven ring road Leuven, Brussels, Tervuren, Wavre, Namur, Tienen, Diest, Aarschot, Mechelen N292 Tienen Kessel-Lo (30.402 inh.)	Diest Hasselt	Brussels
(European Union) (Belgium) Flanders Flemish Brabant	Lubbeek	Leuven - Diest	Linden (5.106 inh.)	Diest Hasselt	Leuven Brussels
(European Union) (Belgium) Flanders Flemish Brabant	Tielt-Winge	Leuven - Diest	N223 Aarschot, Tienen Sint-Joris-Winge (2.960 inh.)	Diest Hasselt	Leuven Brussels
(European Union) (Belgium) Flanders Flemish Brabant	Bekkevoort	Leuven - Diest	Bekkevoort (6.459 inh.) N29 Glabbeek, Tienen 24 (Bekkevoort) E314 Leuven, Brussels(E40), Hasselt, Genk, Germany (Aachen) Assent (1.630 inh.)	Diest Hasselt	Leuven Brussels
(European Union) (Belgium) Flanders Flemish Brabant	Diest	Leuven - Diest	R26, Diest ring road Diest, Aarschot, Laakdal, Tessenderlo, Beringen, Hasselt, Leuven Start of concurrency with R26 N10 Scherpenheuvel-Zichem, Aarschot Diest (24.516 inh.) End of concurrency with R26 R26, Diest ring road Diest, Aarschot, Laakdal, Tessenderlo, Beringen, Hasselt, Leuven Webbekom (2.480 inh.)	Hasselt	Leuven Brussels
(European Union) (Belgium) Flanders Limburg	Halen	Halen - Hasselt	25 (Halen) E314 Leuven, Brussels(E40), Hasselt, Genk, Antwerp (E313), Liège (E313), Germany (Aachen) Zelk (895 inh.) N2c Halen-center Halen (9.475 inh.) N2c Halen-center Gete	Hasselt	Diest Leuven
(European Union) (Belgium) Flanders Limburg	Herk-de-Stad	Halen - Hasselt	N2d, N716 Herk-de-Stad-center, Nieuwerkerken, Sint-Truiden Herk-de-Stad (12.756 inh.) N2d, N754 Herk-de-Stad-center, Alken N717 Schulen, Lummen, Beringen Berbroek (1.678 inh.)	Hasselt	Diest Leuven
(European Union) (Belgium) Flanders Limburg	Hasselt	Hasselt	Spalbeek (2.155 inh.) Kermt (4.573 inh.) N725 Lummen N729 Heusden-Zolder 27 (Hasselt-West) E313 Hasselt, Liège, Antwerp, Genk (E314), Leuven (E314), Brussels (E314), Germany (Aachen) (E314) Kuringen (11.478 inh.) R71, Hasselt ring road Hasselt, Diest, Sint-Truiden, Tongeren, Liège, Bilzen, Genk, Lommel, Beringen, Netherlands (Maastricht) Hasselt (79.524 inh.) R70 Hasselt innen ring Start of concurrency with R70 N80 Alken, Sint-Truiden N20 Kortessem, Tongeren, Liège R70 Hasselt innen ring End of concurrency with R70 R71, Hasselt ring road Hasselt, Diest, Sint-Truiden, Tongeren, Liège, Bilzen, Genk, Lommel, Beringen, Netherlands (Maastricht)	Bilzen Netherlands (Maastricht)	Diest Leuven
(European Union) (Belgium) Flanders Limburg	Diepenbeek	Diepenbeek - Lanaken	Diepenbeek (19.241 inh.) N76d Diepenbeek-center N76 Genk, Bree, Borgloon	Bilzen Netherlands (Maastricht)	Hasselt
(European Union) (Belgium) Flanders Limburg	Bilzen	Diepenbeek - Lanaken	Beverst (5.468 inh.) Bilzen (32.455 inh.) N730 Zutendaal, Genk, Hoeselt, Tongeren N745 Groot-Spouwen, Riemst N700 Groot-Spouwen, Hoeselt, Bilzen-South Waltwilder (1.259 inh.) Mopertingen (1.243 inh.) N758 Groot-Spouwen, Tongeren	Netherlands (Maastricht)	Bilzen Hasselt
(European Union) (Belgium) Flanders Limburg	Lanaken	Diepenbeek - Lanaken	N78 Lanaken-center, Maasmechelen, Riemst Veldwezelt (3.930 inh.) Albert Canal	Netherlands (Maastricht)	Bilzen Hasselt
(European Union) (Netherlands) (Limburg (Netherlands))	Continuation by Via Regio towards Maastricht				

== See also ==
- Transport in Belgium
