= A2 motorway (Belgium) =

Motorway in Belgium

A2
- Dutch: Autosnelweg 2 French: Autoroute 2

Route information
- Maintained by the Roads and Traffic Agency of the Flemish government
- Length: 88 km (55 mi)

Major junctions
- West end: Leuven junction E40 / A3
- 15 Leuven N264; 16 Gasthuisberg; 17 Leuven N2; 18 Herent N26 / N26a; 20 Wilsele N19; 21 Holsbeek N229; 22 Aarschot N223; 23 Tielt-Winge N258; 24 Bekkevoort N2 / N29; 25 Halen N2; 26 Lummen-Centrum N717 / N717b; Lummen junction E313 / A13; 27 Circuit Zolder N729; 28 Zolder N72; 29 Houthalen-Helchteren N74 / N715 / N715a; 30 Park Midden-Limburg N726; 31 Genk-Centrum N76; 32 Genk-Oost N75 / N744; 33 Maasmelechen N78
- East end: E314 / A 76 at Dutch border

Location
- Country: Belgium

Highway system
- Highways of Belgium; Motorways; National Roads

The A2 is a Belgian motorway that coincides completely with the Belgian part of the European route E314. It starts in Leuven, at the junction with the A3/E40 in the province of Flemish Brabant. Then it goes through the province of Limburg, where it crosses the A13/E313 in Lummen. It ends at the Dutch border, where it became the Dutch A76.

== Pictures ==
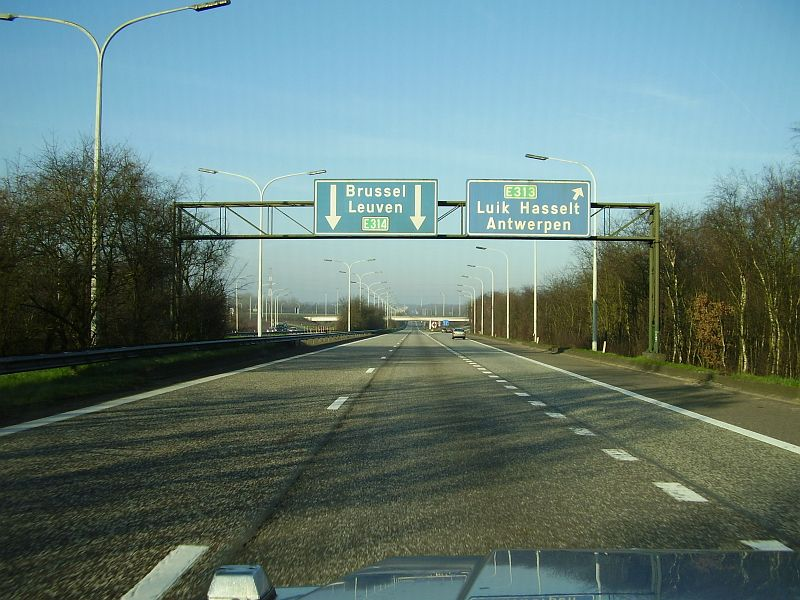
Near the Lummen junction

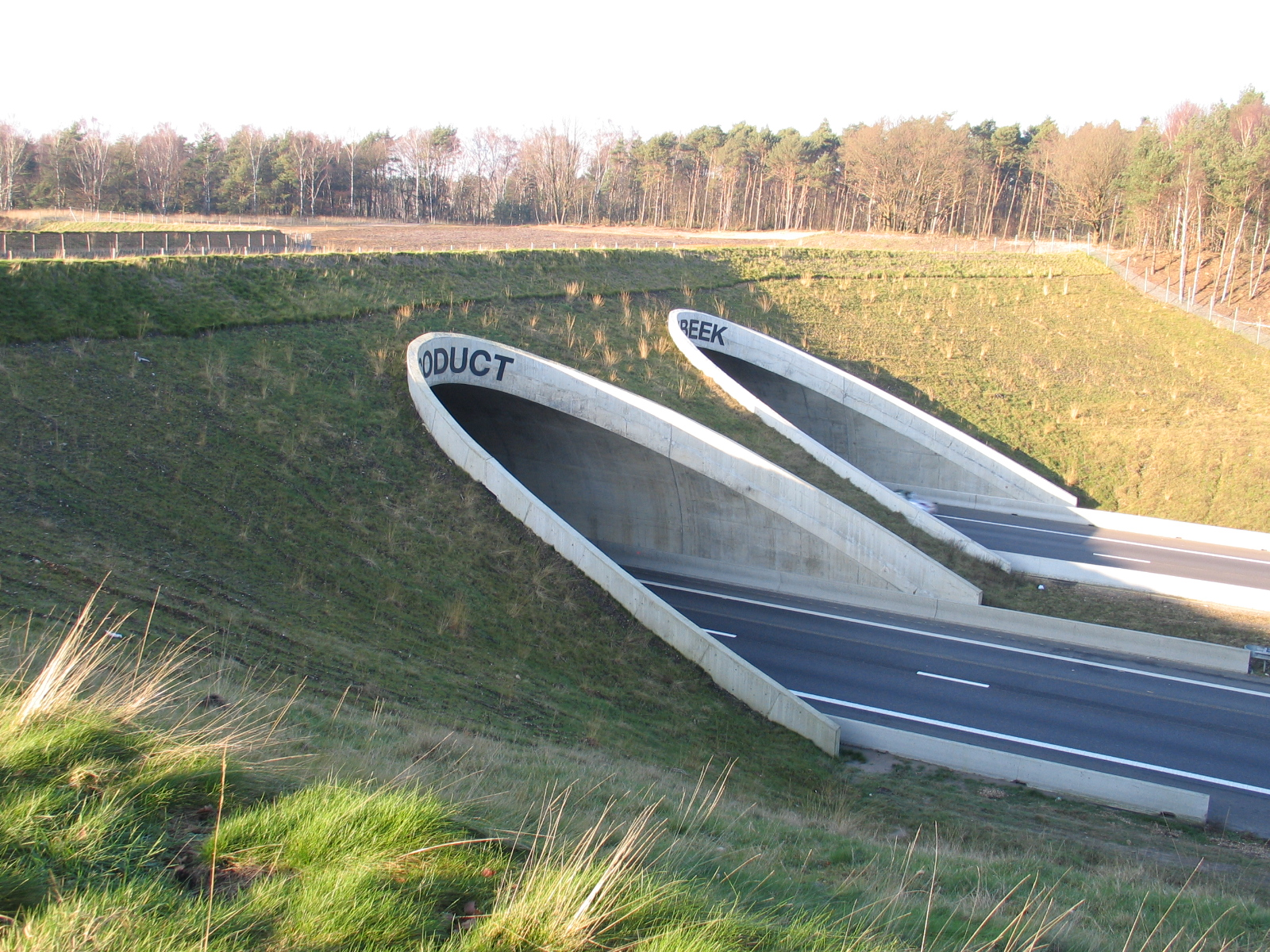
Wildlife crossing Ecoduct Kikbeek

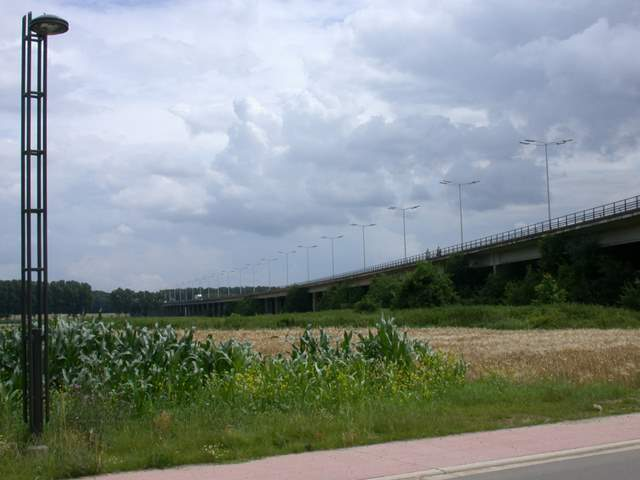
Scharbergbrug over the River Meuse
