= Winge =

Winge is a surname. It can be a short form of Germanic personal names starting with wini-, "friend"; a habitational name originating in Sint-Joris-Winge; a variant of Van (der) Winden, a habitational name from Overwinden or Neerwinden, Belgium; or an ornamental name from vinge, "wing". Notable people with the surname include:

- Axel Winge (1827–1893), Norwegian businessman and politician
- Hanna Winge (1838–1896), Swedish painter
- Herluf Winge (1857–1923), Danish zoologist
- Mårten Eskil Winge (1825–1896), Swedish artist
- Øjvind Winge (1886–1964), Danish biologist and a pioneer in yeast genetics
- Oluf Winge (1855–1889), Danish zoologist
- Per Winge (1858–1935), Norwegian conductor, pianist and composer
- Ralph M. Winge (1925–2020), American politician
- Sigurd Winge (1909–1970), Norwegian painter and visual artist
- Stein Winge (born 1940), Norwegian stage producer, theatre director and actor
- Viktoria Winge (born 1980), Norwegian actress

== See also ==
- Stephan Schulz-Winge (born 1974), German footballer
