= European route E314 in the Netherlands =

European route E 314
- Europese weg E314
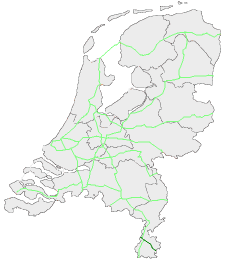
- European routes in the Netherlands with E 314 in dark green

Route information
- Maintained by Rijkswaterstaat

Major junctions
- West end: E314 / A2 at Belgium border
- E25 / A 2 in Stein; A 79 in Heerlen
- East end: E314 / A 4 at Germany border

Location
- Country: Kingdom of the Netherlands
- Constituent country: Netherlands
- Provinces: Limburg

Highway system
- International E-road network; A Class; B Class

European route E 314 (E 314) is a west–east European route, running from Leuven in Belgium, through the Netherlands, to Aachen in Germany.

The highway is maintained by Rijkswaterstaat.

== Exit list ==
The entire route is in Limburg Province.

Municipality	km	mi	Exit	Name	Destinations	Notes
Stein	0.1	0.062	—	—	E314 / A2 west – Brussels, Antwerp	Continuation into Belgium; west end of A76 overlap
Stein	0.6	0.37	1	Stein	Heerstraat-Centrum / Heerstraat-Zuid	Eastbound exit and westbound entrance only
Sittard-Geleen	2.7	1.7	—	Kerensheide Interchange	E25 / A 2 – Maastricht, Amsterdam, Eindhoven	
Sittard-Geleen	2.7	1.7	1a	Stein	Kerenshofweg	Westbound exit only
Sittard-Geleen	4.9	3.0	2	Geleen	Prins Mauritslaan / Rijksweg Zuid	
Beek	7.3	4.5	3	Spaubeek	Zandstraat / Op Het Veldje	Westbound entrance missing
Schinnen	9.7	6.0	4	Schinnen	Nutherweg / Hettekensweg / Breinder / Nagelbeek	
Nuth	12.0	7.5	5	Nuth	N 298 (Van Eynattenweg / Naanhofsweg) / Daelderweg / Stationsplein / Spoorstraat	
Voerendaal	14.5	9.0	—	Ten Esschen Interchange	N 281 south – Landgraaf, Heerlen	Eastbound exit and westbound entrance only
Voerendaal	16.2	10.1	6	Voerendaal	Beersdalweg	Westbound exit only
Heerlen	18.9	11.7	—	Kunderberg Interchange	A 79 west / Welterlaan – Maastricht, Valkenburg aan de Geul, Voerendaal	Missing ramps to and from Welterlaan
Simpelveld	25.0	15.5	7	Simpelveld	N 281 – Simpelveld, Kerkrade, Heerlen, Landgraaf	
Simpelveld	27.1	16.8	—	—	E314 / A 4 southeast	Continuation into Germany; east end of A76 overlap
1.000 mi = 1.609 km; 1.000 km = 0.621 mi: Concurrency terminus; Incomplete access

== See also ==
European route E314
Previous country: Belgium	Netherlands	Next country: Germany
