= Kari Onstad =

Norwegian actress (1941–2020)

Kari Onstad (24 February 1941 – 24 March 2020) was a Norwegian singer and actress.

She began her career in the choir of the Norwegian Opera and Ballet, but then took up acting in 1968. She was employed at Trøndelag Teater from 1968 to 1972 and at Den Nationale Scene from 1976 to 1980. She then worked as a freelancer. In 1991 she portrayed Gina Ekdal in Ibsen's The Wild Duck at the National Theatre.

She was the wife of Stein Winge, daughter-in-law of Sigurd Winge and mother of Viktoria Winge.
