= A76 motorway (Netherlands) =

Motorway in the Netherlands

A76 motorway
- Rijksweg 76
- Location of the A76 motorway

Route information
- Length: 27 km (17 mi)

Major junctions
- West end: Stein; A2 border with Belgium
- East end: Simpelveld; A 4 border with Germany

Location
- Country: Kingdom of the Netherlands
- Constituent country: Netherlands
- Provinces: Limburg

Highway system
- Roads in the Netherlands; Motorways; E-roads; Provincial; City routes

The A76 motorway is a motorway in the Netherlands. It is located entirely in the Dutch province of Limburg.

== Overview ==
The motorway, 27 km long, connects the Belgian border (A2/E314 road) near Stein with Geleen, Heerlen and the German border (A4 road) near Simpelveld. Along the entire stretch of the motorway, the European route E314 travels along the A76.

The A76 features a number of incomplete connections and interchanges. At interchange Ten Esschen, only traffic to and from the western part of the A76 can reach the connecting N281 road. Exit 6, located approximately 1 km to the east, covers traffic from the eastern part of the A76 towards the N281 but not the other way around.

It is mostly two lanes each way. Between Kunderberg and Simpelveld eastbound there is a climbing lane.

== Exit list ==
The entire route is in Limburg Province.

Municipality	km	mi	Exit	Name	Destinations	Notes
Stein	0	0.0	—	—	E314 / A2 southwest	Border with Belgium; this road continues as the Belgian A2; west end of E 314 overlap
Stein	1	0.62	1	Stein	Heerstraat-Centrum / Heerstraat-Zuid	Eastbound exit and westbound entrance only
Stein	8	5.0	—	Interchange Kerensheide	E25 / A 2	
Sittard-Geleen	5	3.1	2	Geleen	Prins Mauritslaan	
Beek	7	4.3	3	Spaubeek	Zandstraat / Op Het Veldje	No westbound entrance
Schinnen	10	6.2	4	Schinnen	Nutherweg / Hettekensweg / Breinder / Nagelbeek	
Nuth	12	7.5	5	Nuth	N 300 (Van Eynattenweg / Naanhofsweg) / Daelderweg / Stationsplein / Spoorstraat	Buitenring Parkstad Limburg
Voerendaal	15	9.3	—	Interchange Ten Esschen	N 281 southeast	Eastbound exit and westbound entrance only
Voerendaal	16	9.9	6	Voerendaal	Putterweg / Beersdalweg	Westbound exit only
Heerlen	19	12	—	Interchange Kunderberg	A 79 west / Welterlaan	
Simpelveld	25	16	7	Simpelveld	N 281	
Simpelveld	27	17	—	Bocholtz	Stevensweg / Bohr	Westbound exit only; only end of westbound exit on Dutch soil, other parts on German soil
Simpelveld			—		E314 / A 4 southeast	Border with Germany; this road continues as the German A4; east end of E 314 overlap
1.000 mi = 1.609 km; 1.000 km = 0.621 mi: Concurrency terminus; Incomplete access
