= European route E314 =

Road in trans-European E-road network

E314

- For most of its length the route of the E314 runs through north-east Belgium

Route information
- Length: 119 km (74 mi)

Major junctions
- From: Leuven (Belgium)
- To: Aachen (Germany)

Location
- Countries: Belgium; Netherlands; Germany

Highway system
- International E-road network; A Class; B Class

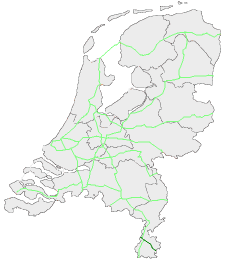
European routes in the Netherlands with E314 in dark green

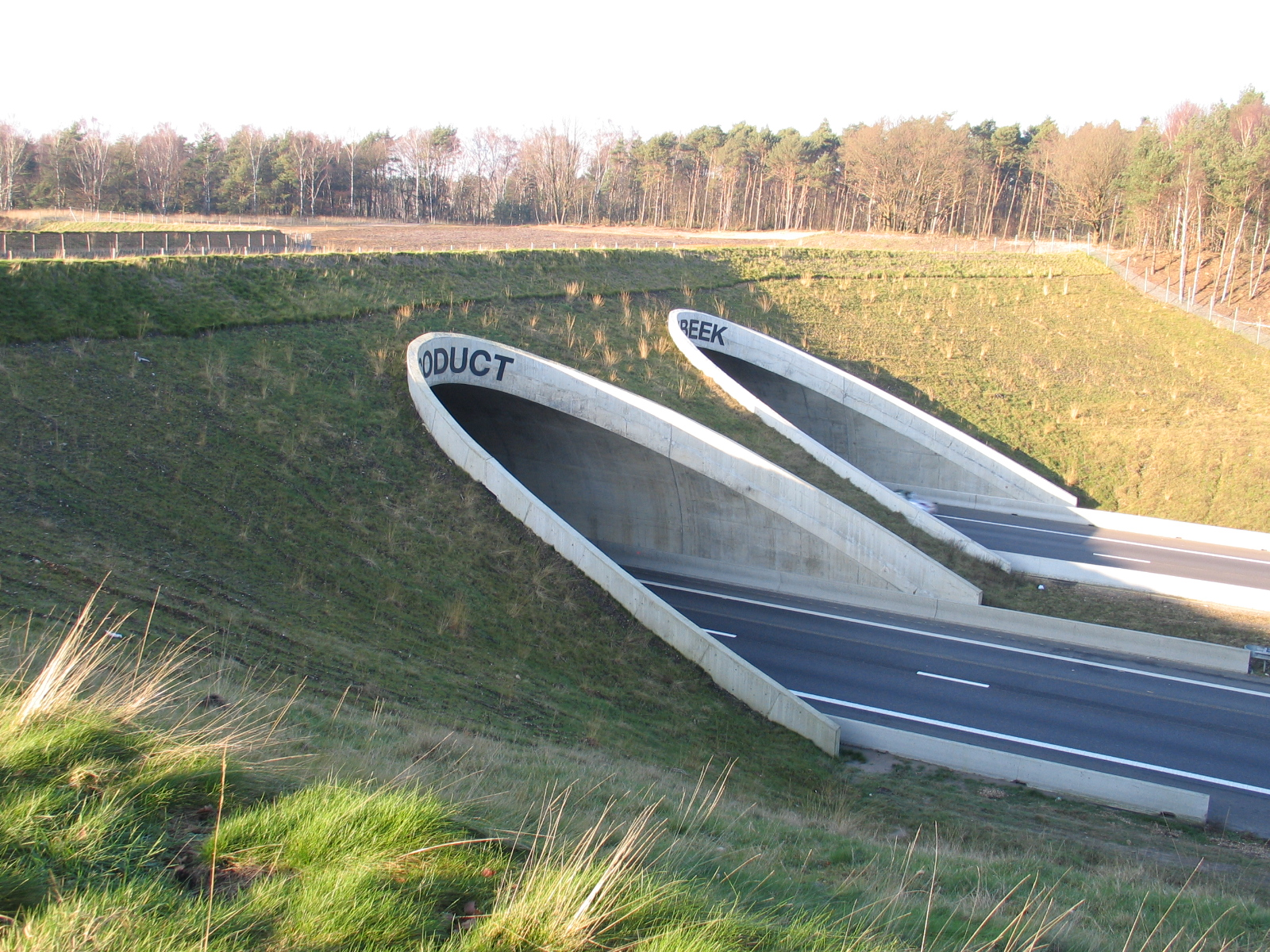
The Kikbeek Ecoduct (wild life crossing point) near Genk was opened to animals in 2005.

The European route E314 is a road in Europe and a part of the United Nations International E-road network. Approximately 125 kilometers (78 mi) long, it connects the Belgian university city of Leuven with Aachen, Charlemagne's capital during the early ninth century, and today a bustling commercial centre in Germany's North Rhine-Westphalia.

== Three Nations ==
For most of its length the E314 is in Belgium where it tracks the A2. It then crosses briefly into Dutch Limburg, the most southerly province of The Netherlands before an even briefer stretch between the Dutch-German frontier and Aachen: the German section tracks the start of the Autobahn A 4, which continues beyond Aachen all the way to Görlitz.

In Belgium the road is of standard autoroute quality with two lanes in each direction. The Dutch section includes a short six lane section but also the only part of the E314 of sub-autoroute quality, though even here the road uses a dual carriageway lay-out.

== Highlights of the route ==
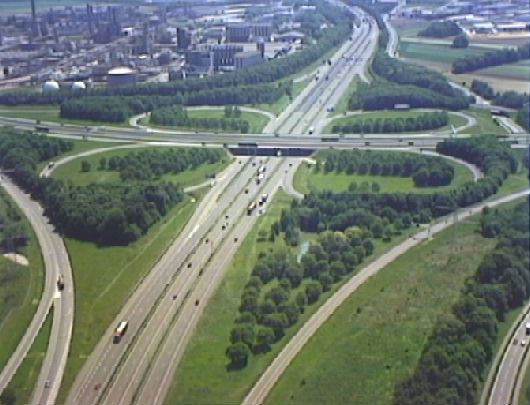
The junction with the north-south A2 Highway (here doubling with the E25) connecting Maastricht with Amsterdam is a cloverleaf junction.

Between the end points, the road also serves the industrial city of Genk where Ford once built their Mondeo model. The Belgian section continues through the Hoge Kempen National Park: in 2005 the Kikbeek Ecoduct was opened here, whereby the road runs through a short tunnel section above which wild life has space to cross the road in relative safety.

The Dutch section is noteworthy for the sight of a large chemical plant shortly after crossing the frontier from Belgium. In the Netherlands, near to Heerlen, the E414 also crosses the Dutch A2 Highway, a major artery of the Dutch roadway network, connecting nearby Maastricht with the heart of the country and Amsterdam.

== Language changes ==
The area covered by this road has historically been at the border of three different linguistic regions. Place names on the E314 will be known to English speakers by different names according to when it was adopted into English language. Most known at the eastern end of the road is Aachen still known to English speakers (and in their nineteenth century literature) by its French name as "Aix" or "Aix-la-Chapelle", while road signs in Belgian Limburg eventually still mention the Dutch name "Aken".

At the western end of the road Leuven is located in the Dutch speaking region, although in foreign (French, English, German ...) maps or literature "Louvain" (which has never been the city's official name) may still appear.

== The route ==
E 314 Leuven (Louvain) - Aachen (Aken, Aix la Chapelle)
State	National; Road; Number	Section	Junction (national numbering)	Pan European road connections
......Province				
Brabant (Flemish) Limburg	A2	Leuven - Lummen	A 2 Heverlee; A 2 15 Leuven; A 2 16 Gasthuisberg; A 2 17 Winksele; A 2 18 Herent; A 2 19 (Exit closed); A 2 20 Wilsele; A 2 21 Holsbeek; A 2 Wezemaal; A 2 22 Aarschot; A 2 23 Tielt-Winge; A 2 24 Bekkevoort; A 2 25 Halen; A 2 26 Lummen centre A 2 Lummen	E40 E313
Limburg	A2	Lummen - Maasmechelen	A 2 27 Zolder-Terlaemen; A 2 28 Zolder; A 2 29 Houthalen-Helchteren; A 2 30 Park Midden-Limburg; A 2 31 Genk centre A 2 32 Genk east A 2 33 Maasmechelen	
......Province				
Limburg	A76	Maasmechelen - Kerensheide	A 76 1 Stein; A 76 Kerensheide	E25
Limburg	A76	Kerensheide - Simpelveld	A 76 2 Geleen; A 76 3 Spaubeek; A 76 4 Schinnen; A 76 5 Nuth; A 76 Ten Esschen; A 76 6 Voerendaal; A 76 Kunderberg; A 76 7 Simpelveld	
Limburg	A76	Simpelveld - Bocholtz	A 76 Bocholtz	
...District (Kreis)				
AC	A 4	Bocholtz - Aachen	A 4 Bocholtz; A 4 2 Aachen-Laurensberg; A 4 3 Aachen centre A 4 4 Kreuz Aachen	E40
