= E314 =

E314 or E-314 may be:

- Guaiacum, a food additive
- European route E314, a European route class B road connecting the Belgian city of Leuven with the German city of Aachen
