= Kasteel Lagendal =

Country house in Lummen, in the province of Limburg, Belgium

Coordinates: 50.9763°N 5.23461°E

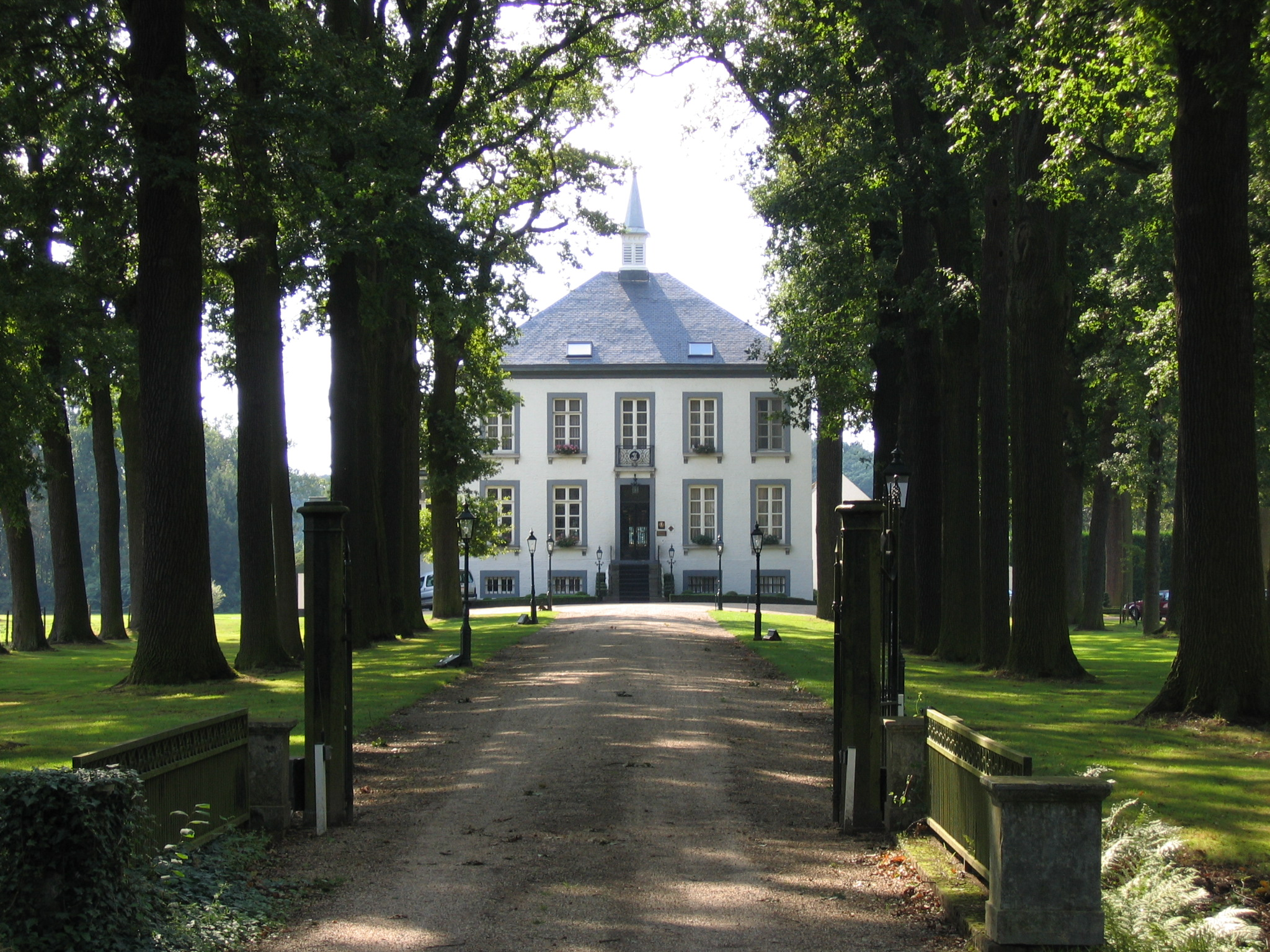
Kasteel Lagendal, Lummen

Kasteel Lagendal is a country house in Lummen, in the province of Limburg, Belgium. It was built in 1850 in a vernacular late classical style as a shooting box commissioned by Paul Jacobs-Stellingwerff of Hasselt. Its name comes from its site on the longest point of the Lummen. Until 2005, renamed Kasteel Saint-Paul, it housed an up-market French restaurant.

== See also ==
- List of castles in Belgium
