= Stein Winge =

Norwegian actor, stage producer and theatre director (1940–2024)

- Born: 10 November 1940; Oslo, German-occupied Norway
- Died: 26 February 2024 (aged 83)
- Occupation(s): Actor, stage producer and theatre director
- Spouse: Kari Onstad
- Children: Viktoria Winge
- Father: Sigurd Winge

Stein Winge (10 November 1940 – 26 February 2024) was a Norwegian stage producer, theatre director and International Emmy-Nominated actor.

== Biography ==
Winge produced numerous plays and operas, and was theatre director at the National Theatre from 1990 to 1992. He was decorated as a Knight, First Class of the Royal Norwegian Order of St. Olav in 2001. He was the son of Sigurd Winge, husband of Kari Onstad and father of Viktoria Winge. On 16 August 2008, the opera Tosca premiered at OscarsborgOpera with Stein Winge as director.

Winge portrayed industrialist Axel Aubert in the 2015 television series The Heavy Water War.

Winge died on 26 February 2024, at the age of 83.

Cultural offices
Preceded by Ellen Horn; Ole-Jørgen Nilsen; Sverre Rødahl	Director of the National Theatre; 1990–1992	Succeeded by Ellen Horn
