= Wiehltal bridge =

Motorway bridge in Germany

Wiehltal Bridge Wiehltalbrücke
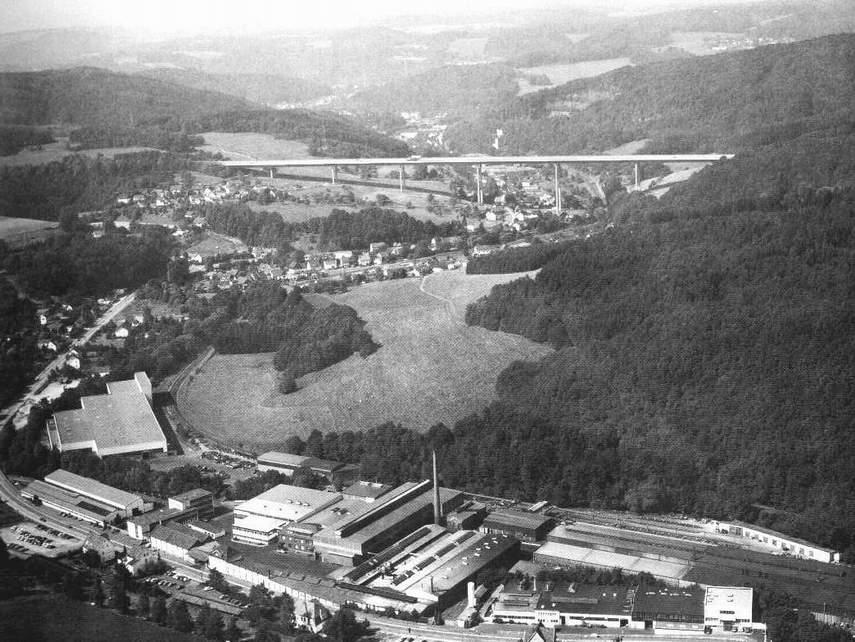
- Coordinates: 50°58′29″N 7°29′25″E
- Carries: Bundesautobahn A 4
- Crosses: River Wiehl
- Locale: Weiershagen, Wiehl, North Rhine-Westphalia

Characteristics
- Total length: 705 m
- Width: 30.25 m
- Height: 60 m

History
- Construction end: 1971

Location
- Interactive map of Wiehltal Bridge

The Wiehltal Bridge is a highway bridge on the A 4 motorway between Cologne and Olpe over the Wiehltal valley at Engelskirchen (Oberbergischer Kreis), North Rhine-Westphalia, Germany.

== Overview ==
The bridge is 30.25 m wide, 705 m long and has a bridge surface of 21,326 m^{2}. The highest point above ground is 60 m. It consists completely of a steelwork construction, whose rolling-element bearing rests on concrete pillars. In contrast to similar bridges, the roadways of both driving directions are carried by continuous elements. Construction of the bridge was completed in 1971.

== Damage and closure ==
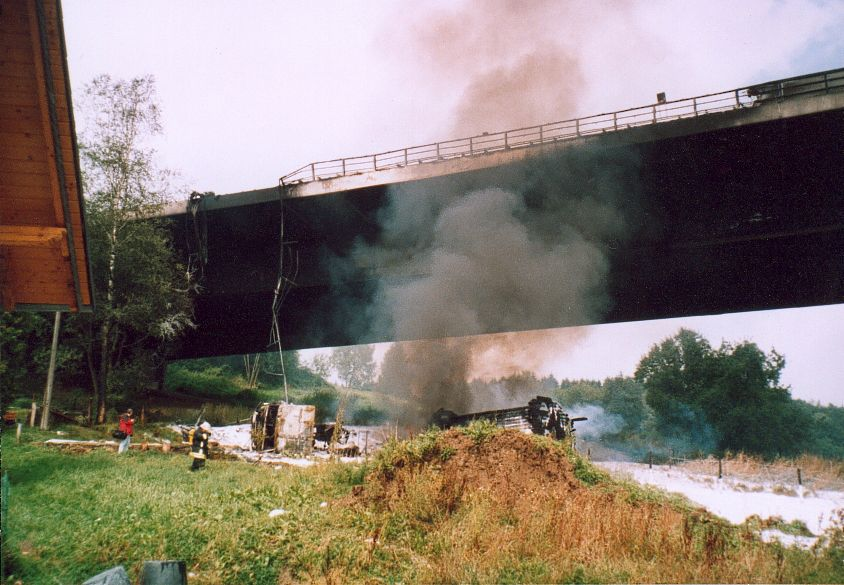
The burning remains of the tanker under the bridge

At 10:40 on 26 August 2004 a car, whose driver was not holding a license, collided with a tanker truck containing 32,000 liters of fuel on the Wiehltal Bridge. The guard rails were designed only to stop vehicles up to 13 tons and were unable to hold the truck, which fell 30 meters off the A 4 Autobahn and exploded. The truck driver was killed; the heat damage destroyed the load-bearing ability of the bridge and it had to be closed to traffic.

Provisional repairs were made in autumn 2004. Plans for a replacement bridge were expected to be formulated in the spring of 2005. Repairs are estimated at €32 million and replacement could cost up to €250 million, including the cost for disposing of the waste. This was by far the most expensive accident in the history of the Federal Republic of Germany.

== Repair and reopening ==
The bridge was repaired and re-opened to traffic on 18 October 2007.

== See also ==
- List of road accidents
