= Tessenderlo Group =

Chemicals manufacturer (e. 1919)

- Company type: Public company
- Founded: 1919
- Headquarters: Tessenderlo, Belgium
- Key people: Stefaan Haspeslagh (Chairman of the board of directors), Luk Tack (CEO
- Industry: Chemicals
- Revenue: ▲€1,657.3 billion (2017)
- Employees: 4,547 (end 2017)
- Website: tessenderlo.com
- Commercial: Yes

Tessenderlo Group is a multinational industrial group that was founded in Tessenderlo, Belgium, in 1919 as Produits Chimiques de Tessenderloo. The group's areas of business include the production, trading and marketing of crop nutrients and crop protection products, animal by-product processing, and industrial services. Tessenderlo Group is traded on the Euronext Brussels stock exchange.

== History ==
On Wednesday, 29 April 1942, an enormous explosion of ammonium nitrate destroyed the entire Produits Chimiques de Tessenderloo factory and much of the surrounding town of Tessenderlo. In the incident, 189 people died and more than 900 were injured. The factory was later rebuilt in the same place, a very controversial decision.

In 2015, Tessenderlo merged with Picanol.
