= A79 motorway (Netherlands) =

Highway in the Netherlands

A79 motorway
- Rijksweg 79
- Location of the A79 motorway

Route information
- Length: 17 km (11 mi)

Major junctions
- West end: A2 in Meerssen
- East end: A76 in Heerlen

Location
- Country: Kingdom of the Netherlands
- Constituent country: Netherlands
- Provinces: Limburg

Highway system
- Roads in the Netherlands; Motorways; E-roads; Provincial; City routes

The A79 motorway is a motorway in the Netherlands. It is located entirely in the Dutch province of Limburg.

== Overview ==
The motorway, 17 km long and entirely two lanes, connects the A2 motorway at the interchange Kruisdonk with Valkenburg, the A76 motorway at interchange Kunderberg, and the city of Heerlen.

The Kruisdonk interchange can be used only by traffic between the A79 and the southern part of the A2. Traffic from and to the northern part of the A2 must local roads.

No European routes follow the A79 motorway.

== Exit list ==
The entire route is in Limburg Province.

| Municipality | km | mi | Exit | Name | Destinations | Notes |
|---|---|---|---|---|---|---|
| Meerssen | 0 | 0.0 | — | Interchange Kruisdonk | E25 / A 2 | No entrance or exit from southward A2 / E 25 |
| Meerssen | 1 | 0.62 | 1 | Bunde | Ambyerweg | No westbound entrance |
| Meerssen | 4 | 2.5 | 2 | Meerssen | Provinciale Weg Vroenhof / Houthemerweg / Eigenweg / Meerssenderweg / Vroenhofweg / Eijsendaalweg | |
| Valkenburg aan de Geul | 6 | 3.7 | 3 | Valkenburg | Breedenweg / Beekstraat / De Valkenberg | |
| Nuth | 9 | 5.6 | 4 | Hulsberg | N 298 north (Hulsbergerweg) / Emmaberg | |
| Voerendaal | 11 | 6.8 | 5 | Klimmen | Klimmenerweg / Waakheuvelsweg / Kalfshofweg | Eastbound exit and westbound entrance only |
| Voerendaal | 13 | 8.1 | 5 | Klimmen | Steinweg / Barrierweg | Westbound exit and eastbound entrance only |
| Voerendaal | 14 | 8.7 | 6 | Voerendaal | Valkenburgerweg | Eastbound exit and westbound entrance only |
| Voerendaal | 17 | 11 | 6 | Voerendaal | Kunderberg / Welterweg | Westbound exit and eastbound entrance only |
| Heerlen | 17 | 11 | — | Interchange Kunderberg | E314 / A 76 | |
| Heerlen | 18 | 11 | 7 | Heerlen-Centrum | Welterlaan / John F. Kennedylaan | Westbound entrance and eastbound exit only |
| Heerlen | 19 | 12 | — | Heerlen | N 281 (Antwerpseweg) / | |
1.000 mi = 1.609 km; 1.000 km = 0.621 mi: Incomplete access
