= Tessenderlo =

- Municipality
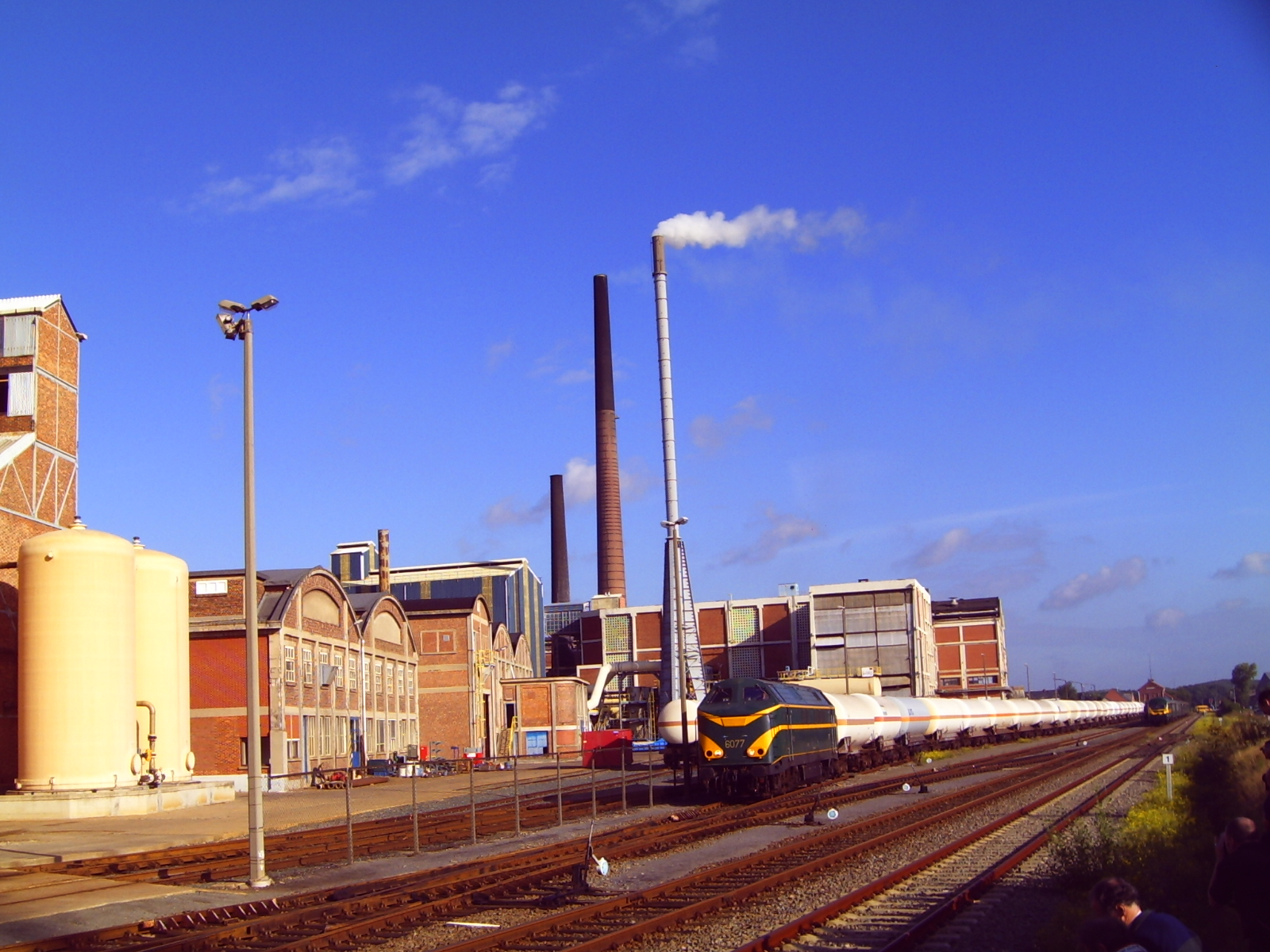
- Chemical plant and rail yard in Tessenderlo

- Flag Coat of arms

- Location of Tessenderlo in Limburg
- Interactive map of Tessenderlo
- Location in Belgium
- Coordinates: 51°04′N 05°05′E
- Country: Belgium
- Community: Flemish Community
- Region: Flemish Region
- Province: Limburg
- Arrondissement: Hasselt

Government
  - Mayor: Karolien Eens (Vooruit-SPiL)
  - Governing parties: Vooruit-SPiL, CD&V

Population (2018-01-01)
  - Total: 18,514
- Postal codes: 3980
- NIS code: 71057
- Area codes: 013
- Website: www.tessenderlo.be

Tessenderlo (Dutch pronunciation: [təˈsɛndərˌloː]; Limburgish: Loei) is a former municipality in the Belgian province of Limburg. It is where the three Belgian provinces of Limburg, Flemish Brabant and Antwerp meet at the front gate of the Averbode Abbey. The municipality Tessenderlo encompasses the villages of Tessenderlo proper, Schoot, Engsbergen, Hulst and Berg. On January 1, 2006, Tessenderlo had a total population of 16,811. The total area is 51.35 km^{2} which gives a population density of 327 inhabitants per km^{2}. The name Tessenderlo means "(the open place in) the forest of the Taxandrians".

It is along the Albert Canal and the European route E313, the highway between Antwerp and Liège, one of the reasons it was the place for the first Belgian "Industrial Zone of National Importance" in the 1960s.

Tessenderlo was the scene of an infamous industrial disaster during World War II, when a stock of 150 tonnes of ammonium nitrate at the chemical plant of Produits Chimiques de Tessenderloo (now Tessenderlo Group) - located near the centre of town - exploded on April 29, 1942, killing 189 people at the plant and in the town.

Tessenderlo is part of a small western zone of Limburg where the local dialect is not the Limburgian dialect, but Brabantic.

== Notable people ==
- Kate Ryan, Belgian singer
- Chantal Calin, Belgian singer
- Tia Hellebaut, Olympic Champion 2008 Highjump
- Minus van Looi, writer
