= OscarsborgOpera =

Coordinates: 59.6735°N 10.6070°E

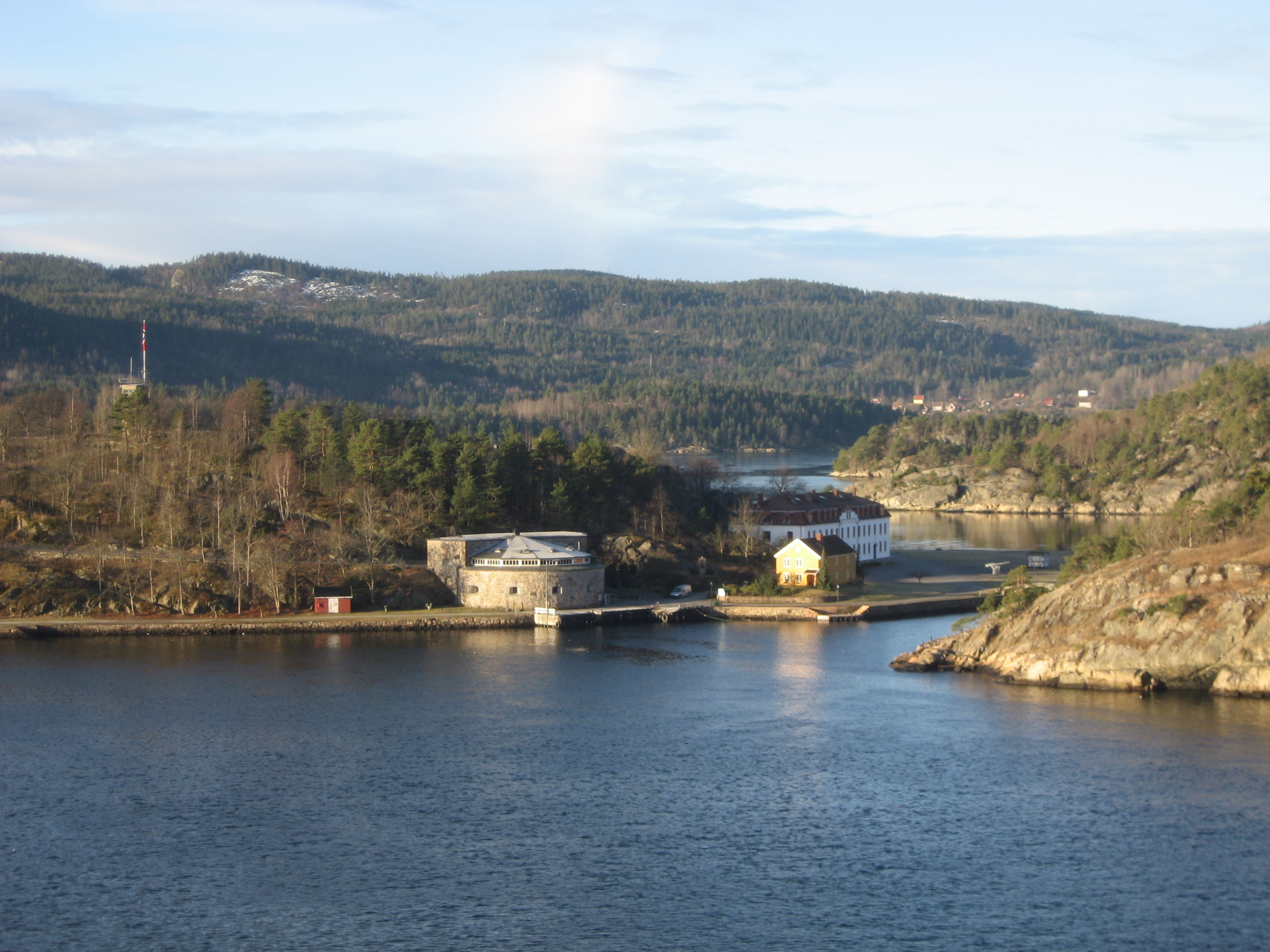
Oscarsborg Fortress in Drøbaksundet

OscarsborgOpera (Norwegian: OscarsborgOperaen) is a non-profit foundation that produces opera performances for performance in the courtyard of Oscarsborg Fortress during the summer, usually in August.

The horseshoe-shaped and relatively small courtyard at Oscarsborg has good acoustics for an outdoor venue, and performances can take place without microphones and electrically amplified sound.

== History ==
Oslofjord Opera Festival was founded in 1998 with general manager / opera director Anne Felberg as one of four initiators. In 2007 the name was changed to OscarsborgOpera.

After a financially difficult time, OscarsborgOpera received state support from 2010, and as a district opera has a fixed item in the state budget. In addition, it receives support from Akershus County, Frogn Municipality, and some private operators. Ticket sales account for 50% of the foundation's income.

== Productions ==
- 2023: Kommandanten
- 2017: Carmina Burana
- 2016: Madama Butterfly
- 2015: Die Fledermaus
- 2014: Rigoletto
- 2013: L'elisir d'amore
- 2010: Aida
- 2009: La bohème
- 2008: Tosca
- 2003: The Magic Flute
- 1998: The Magic Flute
