= Spalbeek =

Sub-municipality of the city of Hasselt, Belgium

- Sub-municipality of Hasselt
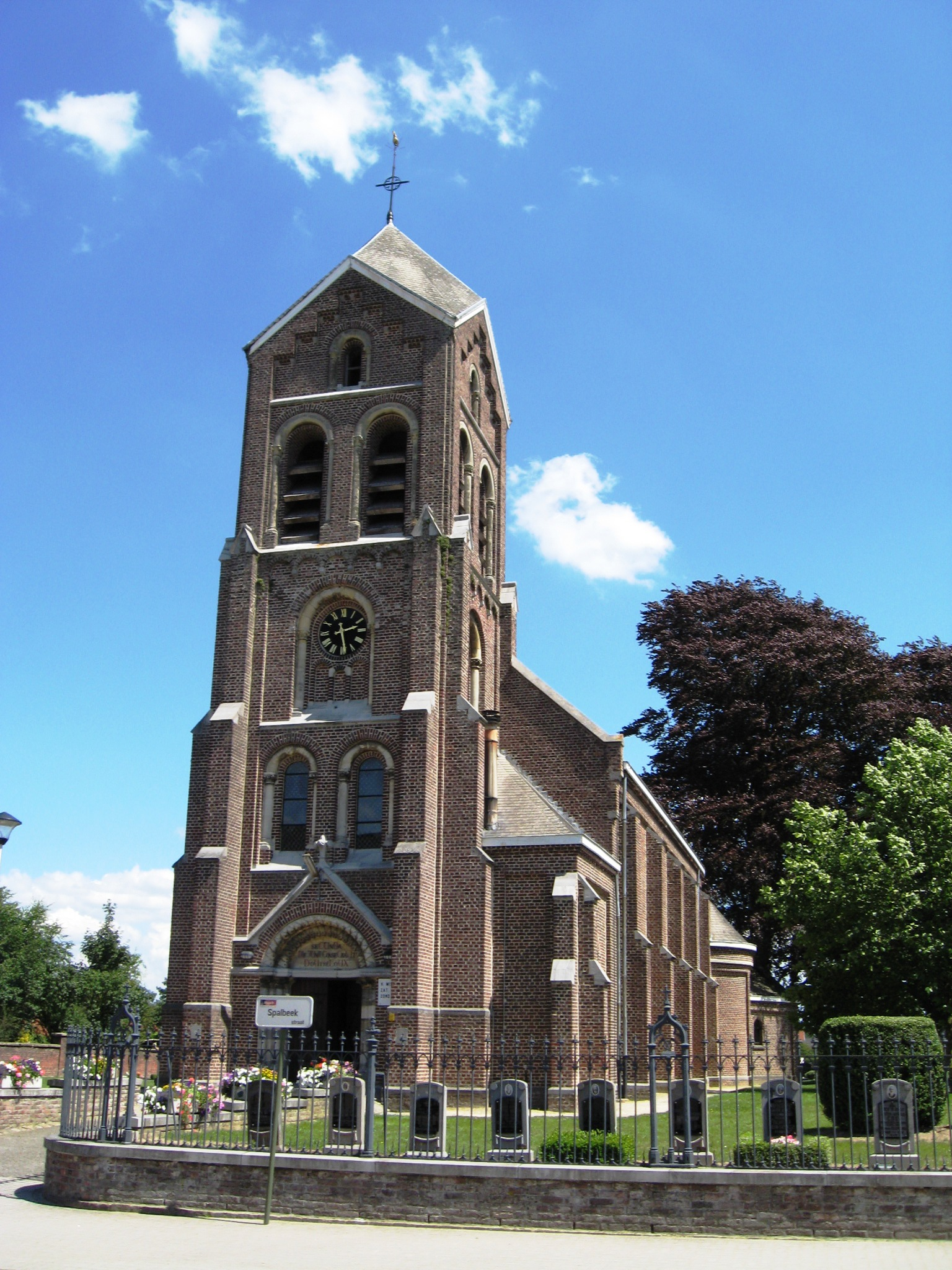
- Church of the Annunciation
- Interactive map of Spalbeek
- Location within Belgium Location within Limburg (Belgium)
- Coordinates: 50°57′00″N 5°14′00″E
- Country: Belgium
- Community: Flemish Community
- Region: Flemish Region
- Province: Limburg
- Arrondissement: Hasselt
- Municipality: Hasselt

Area
  - Total: 4.75 km^{2} (1.83 sq mi)

Population (2020-01-01)
  - Total: 2,135
  - Density: 449/km^{2} (1,160/sq mi)
- Postal codes: 3510
- Area codes: 011
- Website: spalbeek2.be

Spalbeek (Dutch pronunciation: [ˈspɑlbeːk]) is a sub-municipality of the city of Hasselt located in the province of Limburg, Flemish Region, Belgium. It was a separate municipality until 1971. In 1971, it was merged into Kermt. On 1 January 1977, Kermt was merged into Hasselt.
