= European route E313 =

Road in trans-European E-road network

E313

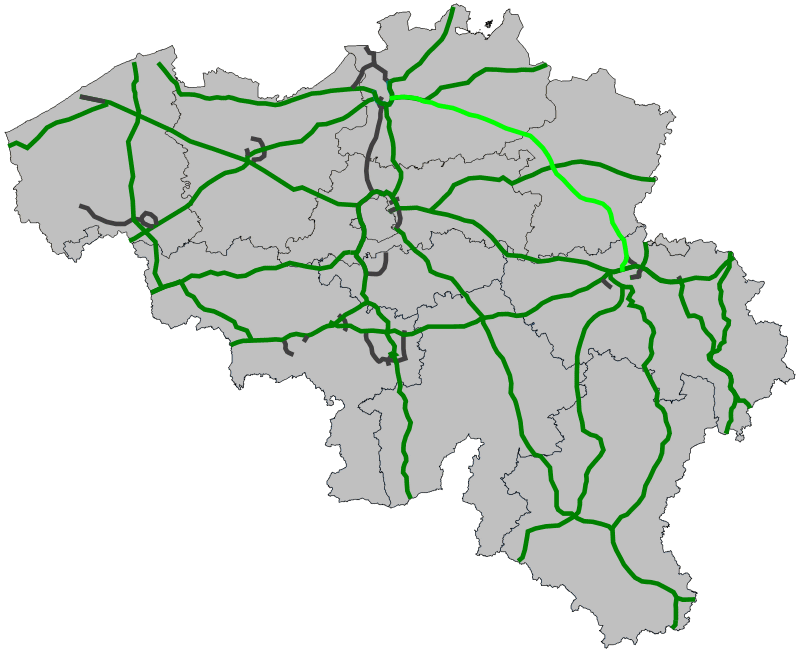
- European routes in Belgium with E313 in bright green

Route information
- Length: 130 km (81 mi)

Major junctions
- From: Antwerp
- To: Liège

Location
- Countries: Belgium

Highway system
- International E-road network; A Class; B Class

The European route E 313 is a road in Europe and a part of the United Nations International E-road network. Approximately 112 kilometers (70 mi) long, it connects the Belgian port city of Antwerp to Liège, the commercial and industrial centre of Wallonia. It runs thus entirely within Belgium: however, it does cross the language frontier within Belgium between the Dutch speaking Flanders and the French speaking Wallonia which affects the roadside route signs and safety-message posters. From the junction at Ranst where it splits from the E34, it follows the Belgian A13.

It also serves the same industrial belt as the Albert Canal, the route of which generally runs close to the E 313. For much of the western end of the road the width of the strip of land between the road and the waterway is too narrow for residential use, and the land has instead been put to good use for industrial developments, notably in the area of Herentals. The other major city served by the E 313 is Hasselt, the capital of the Belgian province of Limburg.

Characterised at the end of the 20th century by its poor surface, much of the road was renovated at the start of the 21st century. The E 313 is an autoroute quality road, though east of the split with the E 34 it still has only two lanes in each direction.

== The route ==
E 313 Antwerp (Antwerpen, Anvers) - Liège (Luik, Lüttich)
State	National; Road; Number	Section	Junction (national numbering)	Pan European road connections
......Province				
Antwerp	A13	Antwerp east - Ranst	A 13 Antwerp east towards, Antwerp, Brussels, Ghent, Bruges, Netherlands (Bergen op Zoom and Breda); A 13 18 Wommelgem; A 13 Ranst; A 13 Ranst east towards Netherlands (Eindhoven)	E 19 & doubling with E 34
Antwerp Limburg	A13	Ranst - Lummen	A 13 19 Massenhoven; A 13 20 Herentals west A 13 21 Herentals Industrial zone A 13 22 Herentals east A 13 23 Geel west A 13 24 Geel east A 13 25 Ham; A 13 25a Tessenderlo; A 13 Tessenderlo; A 13 26 Beringen; A 13 Lummen towards Brussels, Leuven, Genk and Netherlands (Heerlen)	E 314
Limburg	A13	Lummen - Tongeren (Tongres)	A 13 26bis Lummen & Zolder; A 13 27 Hasselt west A 13 28 Hasselt south A 13 29 Hasselt east A 13 30 Diepenbeek west A 13 31 Bilzen & Hoeselt; A 13 32 Tongeren (Tongres)	
Europe Belgium Wallonia				
Liège	A13	Tongres (Tongeren) - Vottem	A 13 33 Boirs; A 13 Fexhe-Slins; A 13 34 Liers; A 13 Vottem towards Brussels Leuven, Namur, Charleroi, Luxembourg (Luxembourg City), Netherlands (Maastricht), Eupen, Verviers and Germany (Aachen and Trier); A 13 35 Vottem	E 25, E 40, E 42
