= Bundesautobahn 4 =

Federal motorway in Germany

A 4
- Bundesautobahn 4

Route information
- Length: 616 km (383 mi)
- Existed: 1934–present

Major junctions
- East end: Autostrada A4 at the German-Polish border in Görlitz, Saxony
- West end: A76 Motorway at the German-Dutch border in Aachen, North Rhine-Westphalia

Location
- Country: Germany
- States: North Rhine-Westphalia, Hesse, Saxony, Thuringia

Highway system
- Roads in Germany; Autobahns; List; Federal; List; State; E-roads
← A 3	→ A 5

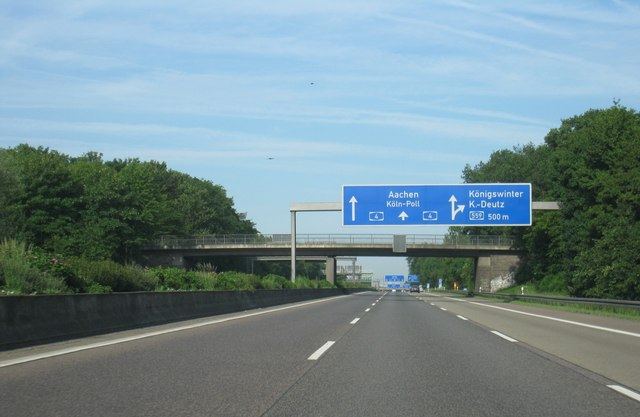
A 4 heading towards Aachen at inter-section with A 559 on the Cologne Beltway

Bundesautobahn 4 (translates from German as Federal Motorway 4, short form Autobahn 4, abbreviated as BAB 4 or A 4) is an autobahn in two discontinuous segments that crosses Germany in a west–east direction. The western segment has a length of 156 km (97 mi), while the part in the east is 429 km (267 mi) long.

== Route ==
The A 4 west of Cologne

The western A 4 starts north-west of Aachen, where the Dutch A76 enters Germany. Initially it is 2 lanes each way with no speed limit. From Kreuz Aachen to Düren and from Kerpen to Refrath (between Refrath and Köln-Merheim) westbound the hard shoulder becomes the third lane at peak times. Between Kreuz Köln-West and Kreuz Heumar it forms the southern part of the Cologne Beltway (Kölner Autobahnring). The rest of the section between Kreuz Aachen and Kreuz Köln-West has a variable speed limit. Between Merzenich and Elsdorf, the speed limit is 130 km/h. Between Kreuz Köln-West and Kreuz Heumar the speed limit is 120 km/h. From Kreuz Köln-Ost to Refrath the maximum speed is 100 km/h. The westbound section between Köln-Merheim and Kreuz Köln-Ost is restricted to 80 km/h. The section between Refrath and the terminus at Krombach has no speed limit. Between Untereschbach and Refrath westbound the limit is 100 km/h weekdays. It is mostly 2 lanes each way, but between Untereschbach and Wiehl, several climbing lanes operate in both directions.

The eastern part starts at the Kirchheim intersection (with the A 7) and goes through Eisenach, Gotha, Erfurt, Weimar, Jena, Gera, Chemnitz, Dresden and Bautzen to Görlitz, where it crosses to Poland and continues as A4.

The westernmost 11 kilometers of the A4 form the most easterly stretch of the European route E314: continuing east from the Aachen interchange (Kreuz Aachen), the A4 is part of European route E40. European routes don't have gaps and E 40 follows A 45 and A 5, which is a suitable route past the gap of A4.

== History ==
In 1927, the first ideas planned connections between Aachen and Cologne, and additional connections between Erfurt and Breslau (Silesia). The first sections were built from 1934 to 1937 (between Chemnitz and Dresden).

Just west of Eisenach was the Wartha-Herleshausen border checkpoint between East and West Germany. Eight kilometers down the road, after the Wommen interchange, the road crosses back into the former East Germany into Gerstungen (today in Thuringia) for seven kilometers before crossing back to the former West Germany at Wildeck. Because of that, the section between Wommen and Wildeck-Obersuhl interchanges was closed and fell into decay during the Cold War. It was bypassed by B 400. Ironically, that section, built in 1943, was the last Reichsautobahn section built before the end of World War II.

The Wildeck-Obersuhl interchange was built only after the war, due to the Gerstungen interchange being exactly on the border. Repairs of those parts were scheduled to be completed in 2007.

In 1999, the new tunnel at Königshain Hills (near Görlitz) was opened. In 2014, the section of A 4 between Cologne and Aachen was rerouted on a new 17 km highway section near Kerpen. The abandonment of the old route was due to the expansion of coal mining in the Hambach open-pit mine.

Reconstruction of the last section in Thuringia between Eisenach and Gotha near the former Inner German Border began in 2007 and required building 25 km (16 mi) of new road.

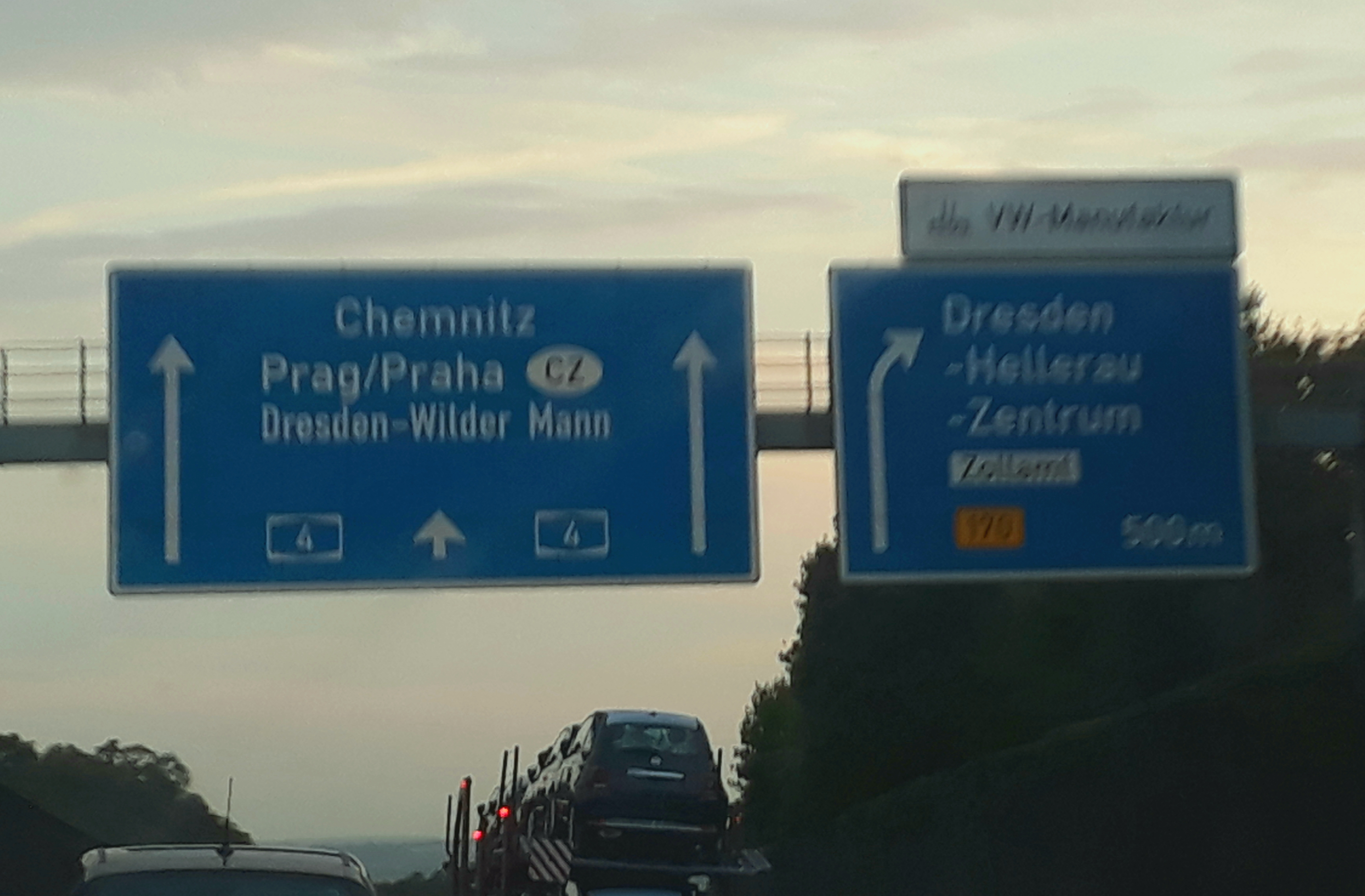
A 4 near Dresden, Saxony.

== Wiehltalbrücke accident ==
The "Wiehltalbrücke" is a bridge that carries the A4 across the valley of the river Wiehl. The A4 near Gummersbach, North Rhine-Westphalia was the site of the then-most expensive traffic accident in German history: On 26 August 2004, a BMW M3, whose driver had no driving license and was later found to be driving under the influence, collided with a truck carrying 33,000 litres of gasoline. The truck crashed through a guardrail, fell off the Wiehltalbrücke and exploded, killing the driver. The subsequent fire caused severe structural damage to the bridge. The BMW driver was jailed for 22 months.

The bridge was closed for weeks until temporary repairs were completed. Permanent repairs finished on 22 August 2006, using a method never before used in Germany. Among other things a 20 m × 31 m segment was replaced while the bridge was closed. The repairs cost €7.2 million.
