= Viktoria Winge =

Norwegian actress (born 1980)

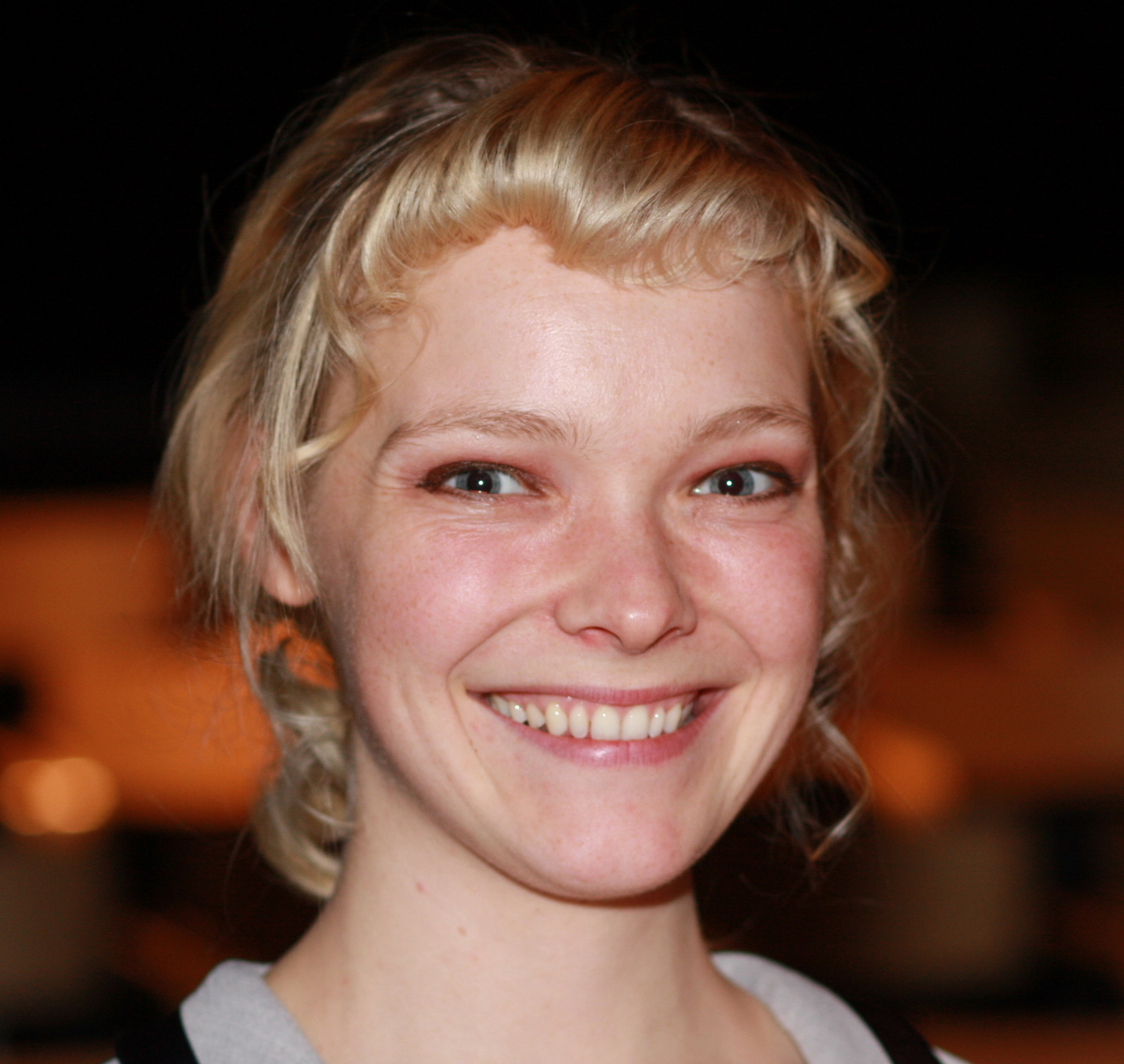
- Born: 5 March 1980 (age 45); Oslo, Norway
- Occupation: Actress

Viktoria Winge (born 5 March 1980) is a Norwegian actress. She is the daughter of actor and director Stein Winge and actress and singer Kari Onstad.

She also led a band called Moviestar.

== Selected filmography ==
Film
Year	Title	Role	Notes
2013	Lilyhammer	Tiril	
2010	Scratch	Lena	
2008	Max Manus	Solveig Johnsrud	
2006	Cold Prey	Ingunn	
2006	Reprise	Kari	
