= Wilsele =

Sub-municipality of the city of Leuven, Belgium

- Sub-municipality of Leuven
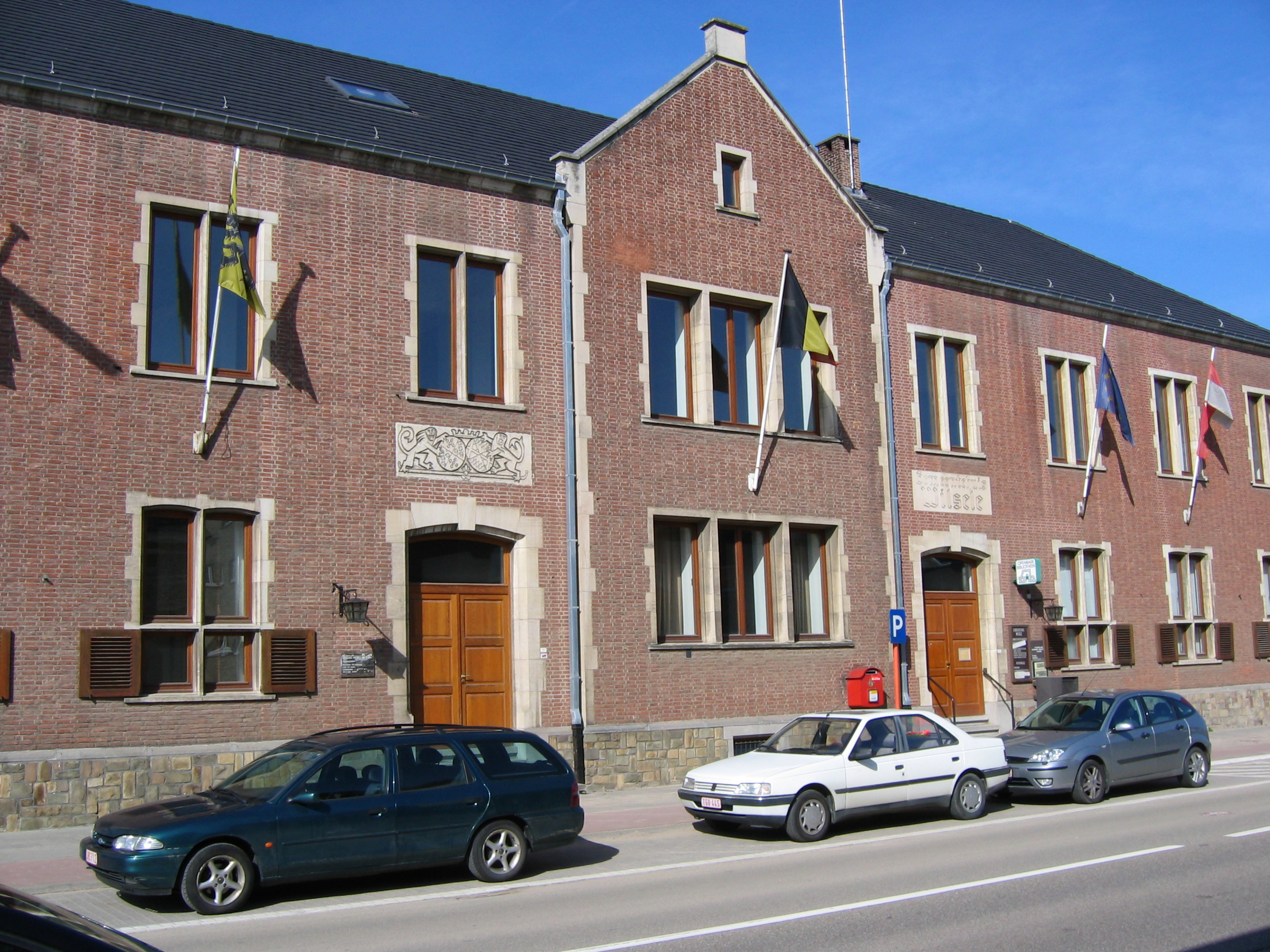
- Former town hall

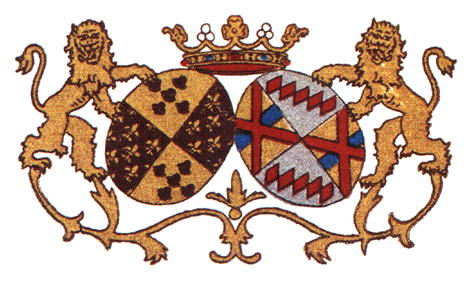
- Coat of arms
- Interactive map of Wilsele
- Location within Belgium Location within Flemish Brabant
- Coordinates: 50°54′00″N 4°42′00″E
- Country: Belgium
- Community: Flemish Community
- Region: Flemish Region
- Province: Flemish Brabant
- Arrondissement: Leuven
- Municipality: Leuven

Area
  - Total: 8.94 km^{2} (3.45 sq mi)

Population (2020-01-01)
  - Total: 9,892
  - Density: 1,110/km^{2} (2,870/sq mi)
- Postal codes: 3012
- Area codes: 016

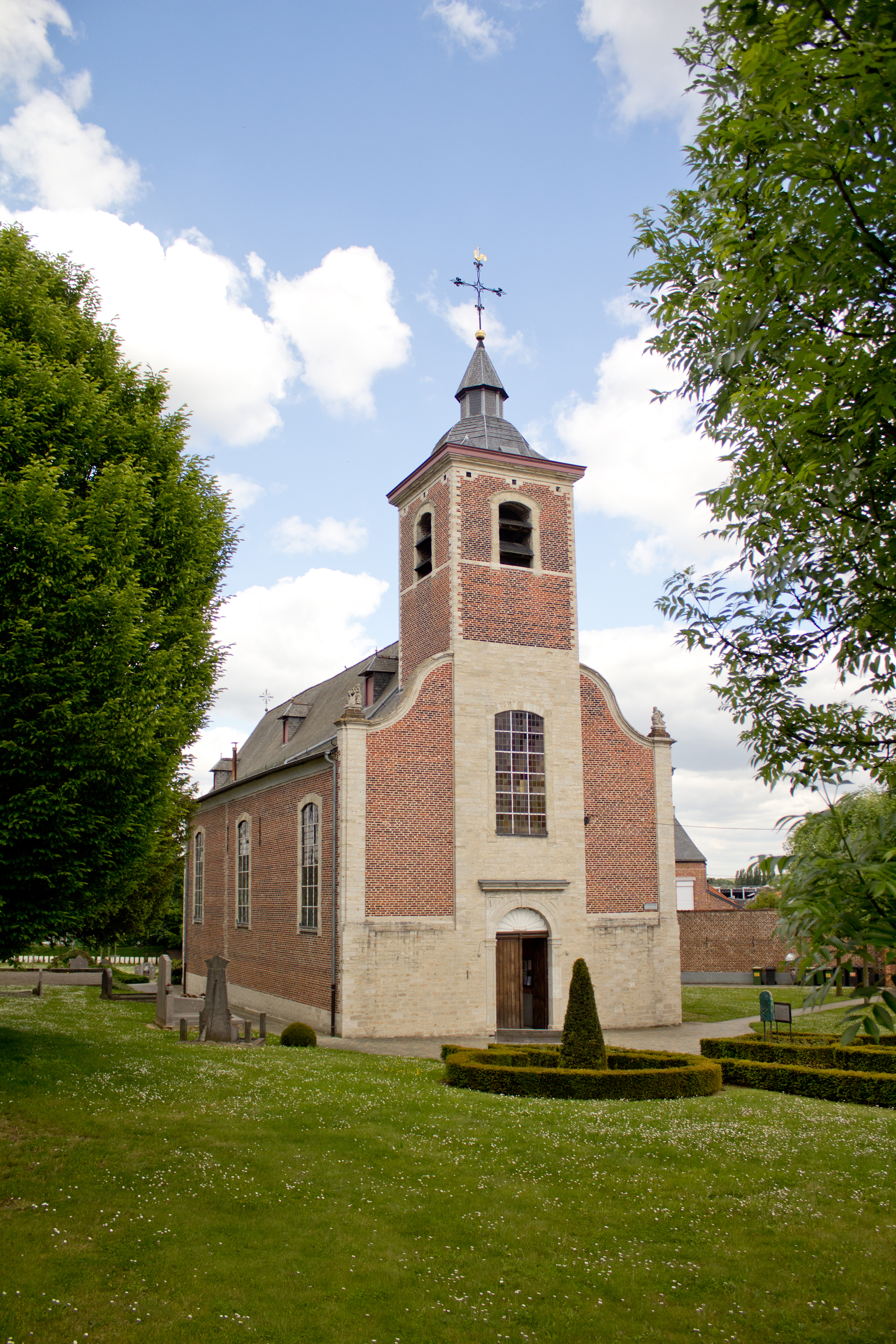
Saint-Martinus church in Wilsele

Wilsele (Dutch pronunciation: [ˈʋɪlsələ]) is a sub-municipality of the city of Leuven located in the province of Flemish Brabant, Flemish Region, Belgium. It was a separate municipality until 1977. On 1 January 1977, it was merged into Leuven.

The Canal Leuven-Dijle which runs from Leuven to Mechelen passes through Wilsele and separates this part of Leuven into two parts: Wilsele-Dorp (Wilsele-Village) and Wilsele-Putkapel. Due to the physical separation, both parts have gone their own way for many years. Only recently Leuven has opened a bridge over the canal.

The central area of Wilsele is situated between Wilsele-Dorp and Wilsele-Putkapel. There is a partial town hall, subsidiary site of the city library and police, as well as a sports and cultural centre. Also the presence of the Centrumstraat (Centre Street) opposite to the town hall is a witness of the past of this part as the village centre.

Part of Wilsele is located on the Keizersberg ("Emperor's Hill") or Boellenberg. The Keizersberg is the site of a beautiful abbey. The abbey houses many students from Leuven.
