= Sigurd Winge =

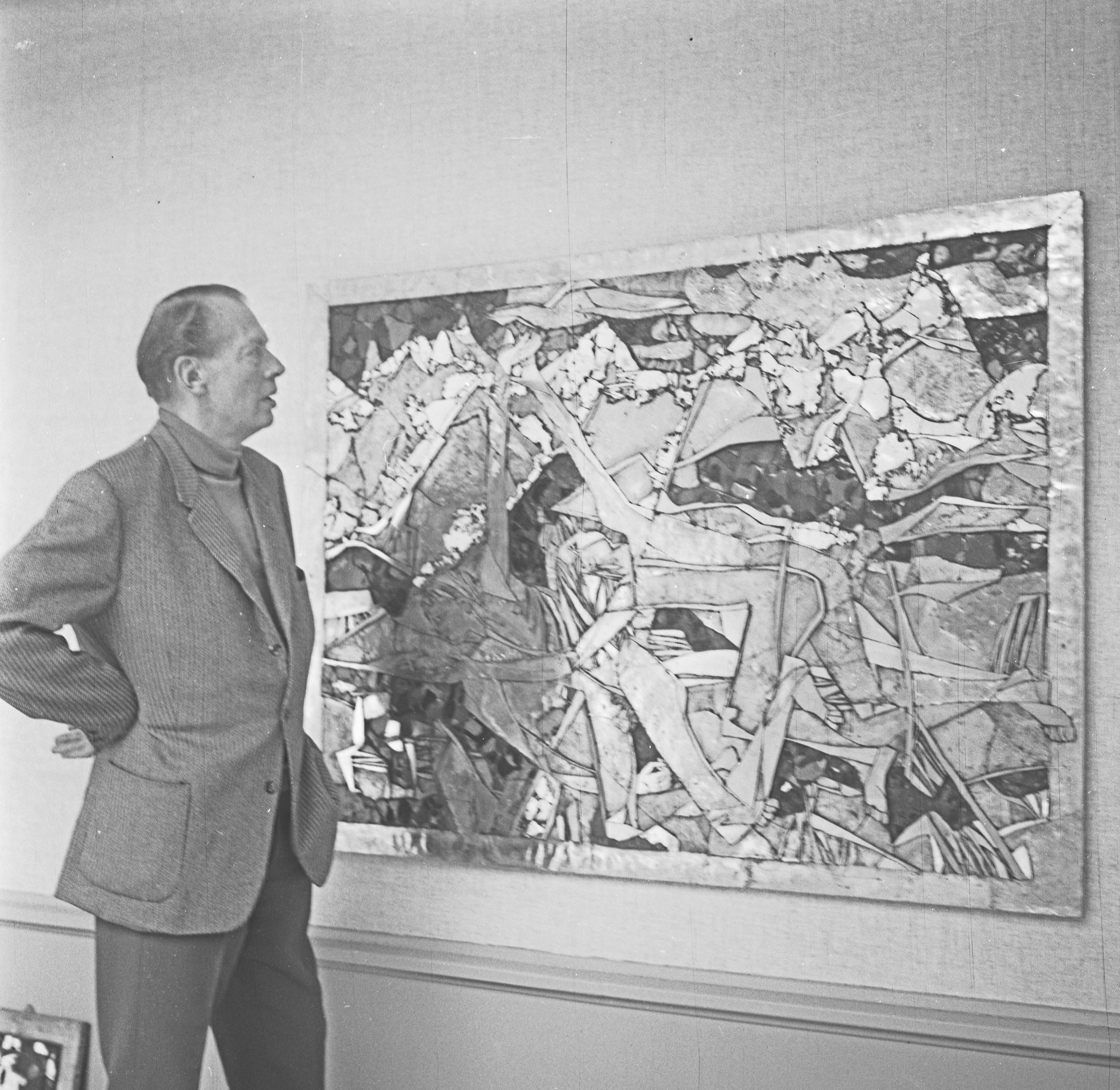
Sigurd Winge in 1969

Sigurd Winge (14 March 1909 – 22 January 1970) was a Norwegian painter and visual artist who worked with various media. He was born in Germany, and the father of actor Stein Winge. Among his works are Terror from 1942 and Kvinnehode (Flyalarm) from 1944/1945. He was a professor at the Norwegian National Academy of Fine Arts from 1969 to 1970.
