= Tielt-Winge =

- Municipality
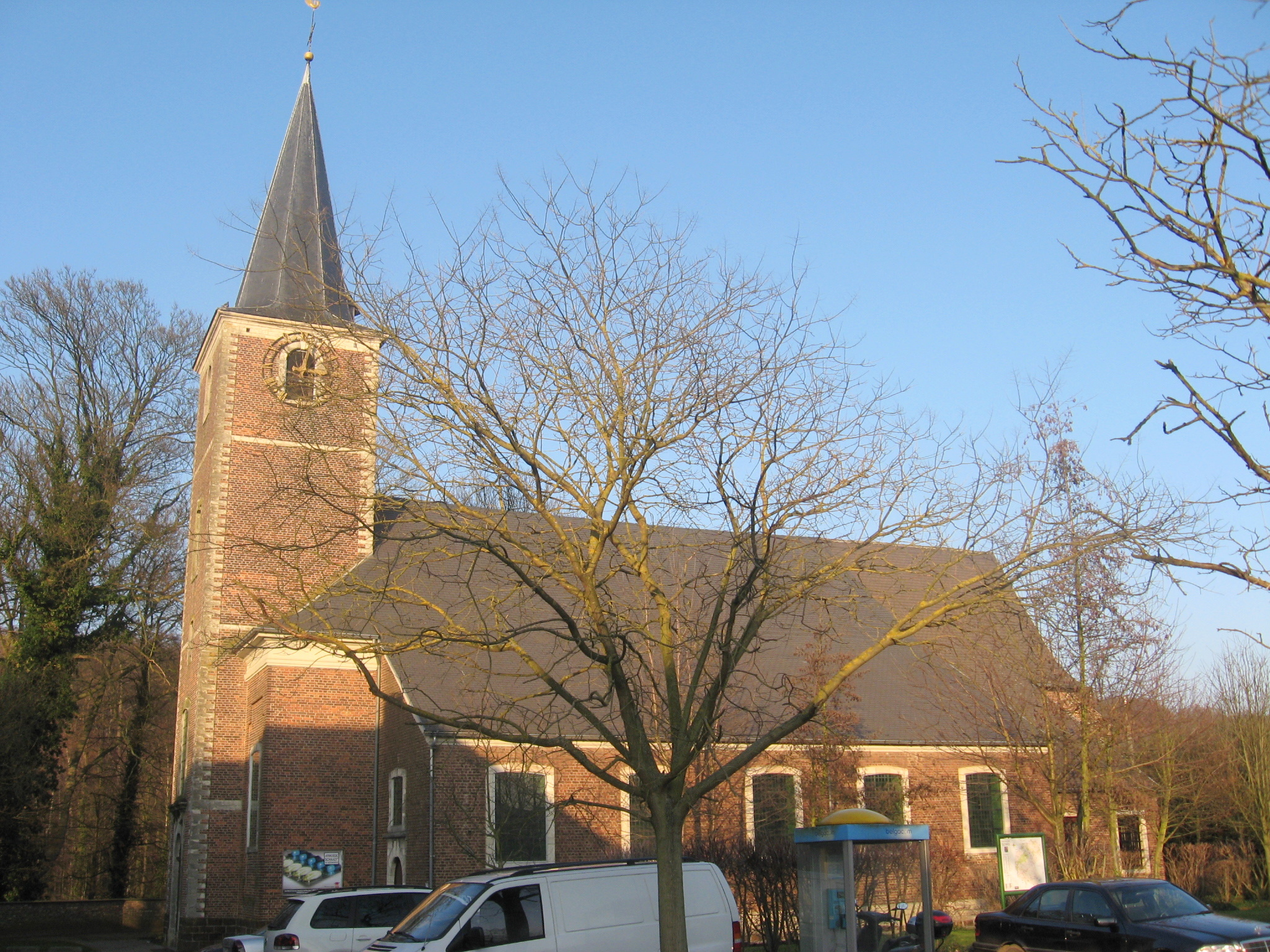

- Flag Coat of arms

- Location of Tielt-Winge in Flemish Brabant
- Interactive map of Tielt-Winge
- Location in Belgium
- Coordinates: 50°55′N 04°54′E
- Country: Belgium
- Community: Flemish Community
- Region: Flemish Region
- Province: Flemish Brabant
- Arrondissement: Leuven

Government
  - Mayor: Katrien Houtmeyers (N-VA)
  - Governing parties: N-VA, CD&V+Groen, Vooruit

Area
  - Total: 44.52 km^{2} (17.19 sq mi)

Population (2018-01-01)
  - Total: 10,707
  - Density: 240.5/km^{2} (622.9/sq mi)
- Postal codes: 3390, 3391
- NIS code: 24135
- Area codes: 016
- Website: www.tielt-winge.be

Tielt-Winge (Dutch pronunciation: [ˌtiltˈʋɪŋə]) is a municipality located in the Belgian province of Flemish Brabant. The municipality comprises the towns of Houwaart, Meensel-Kiezegem, Sint-Joris-Winge and Tielt. On 1 January 2006, Tielt-Winge had a total population of 11,604. The total area is 44.16 km² which gives a population density of 227 inhabitants per square kilometre.

== Villages ==
=== Sint-Joris-Winge ===
Sint-Joris-Winge is a village in Tielt-Winge, which as of 2003, had 2,870 inhabitants.

It is one source of the last name Winge, which is a habitational name derived from the village's name.

== Gallery ==
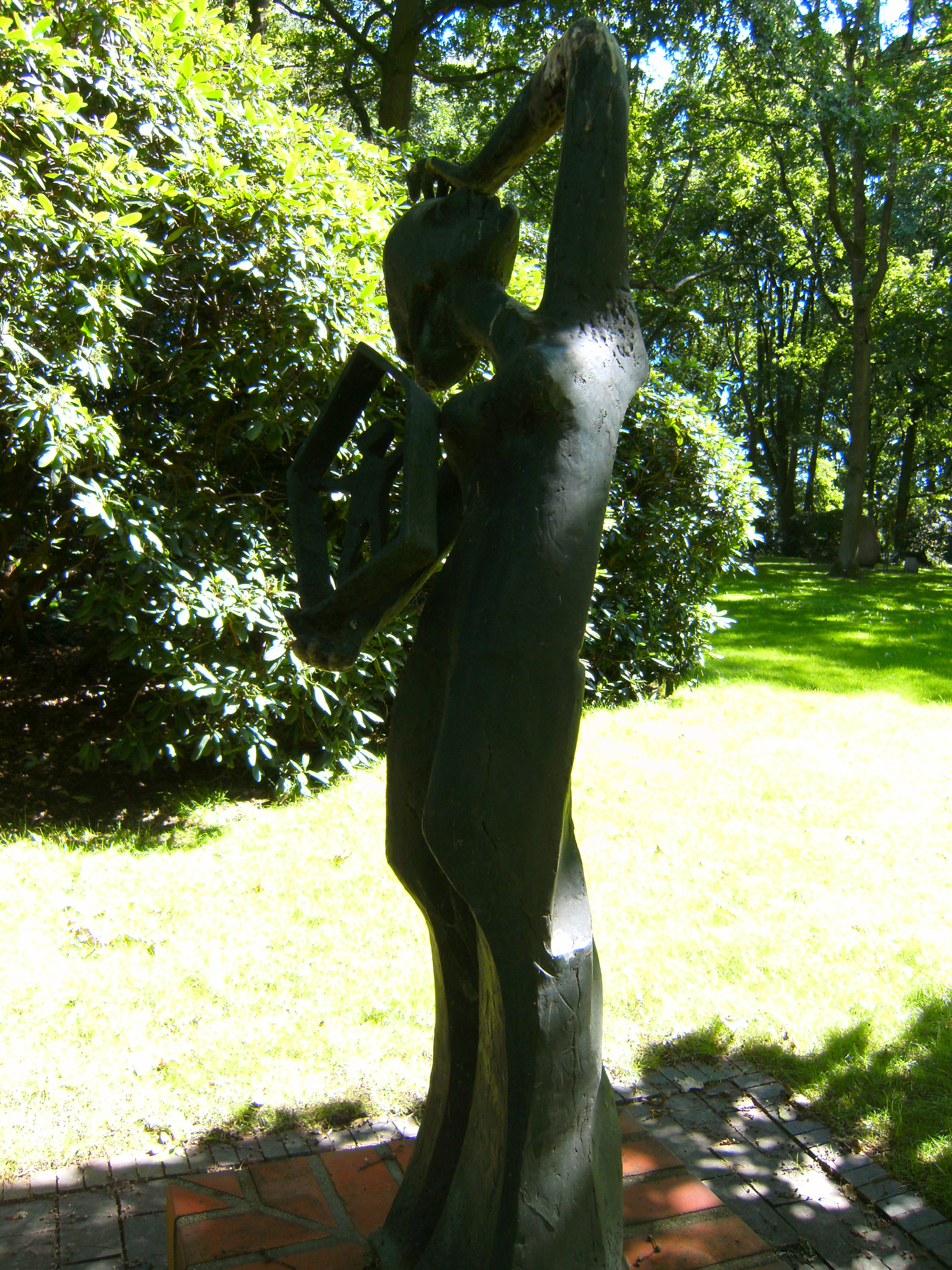
Hamburg, Memorial of Neuengamme concentration camp: memorial area, statue desperation of Meenzel-Kiezegem. In memory of the victims of the deportation 1944.
