= Bekkevoort =

- Municipality
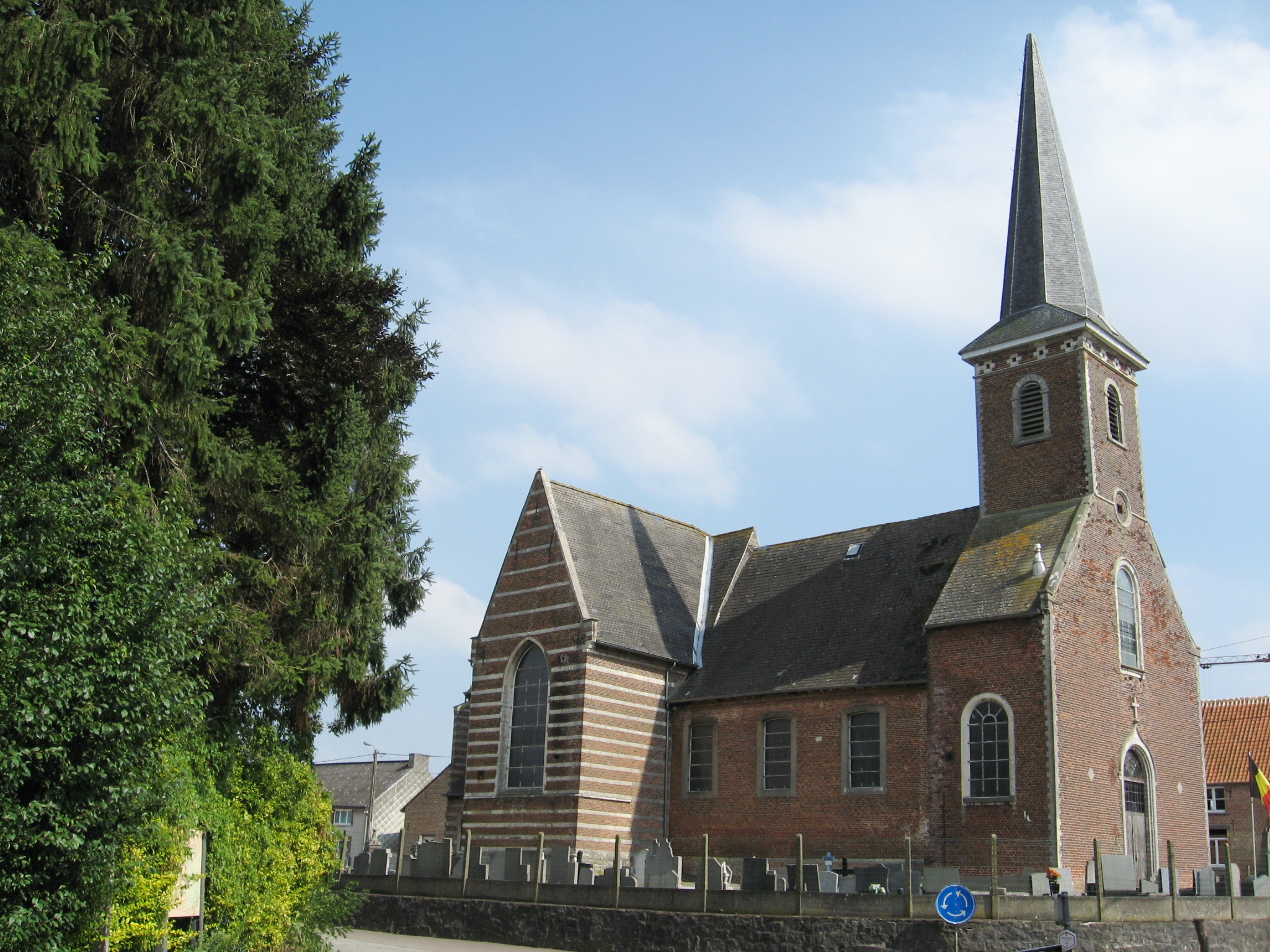

- Flag Coat of arms

- Location of Bekkevoort in Flemish Brabant
- Interactive map of Bekkevoort
- Location in Belgium
- Coordinates: 50°57′N 04°58′E
- Country: Belgium
- Community: Flemish Community
- Region: Flemish Region
- Province: Flemish Brabant
- Arrondissement: Leuven

Government
  - Mayor: Hans Vandenberg (CD&V)
  - Governing parties: CD&V, Ons Dorp

Area
  - Total: 37.28 km^{2} (14.39 sq mi)

Population (2018-01-01)
  - Total: 6,274
  - Density: 168.3/km^{2} (435.9/sq mi)
- Postal codes: 3460, 3461
- NIS code: 24008
- Area codes: 013, 016
- Website: www.bekkevoort.be

Bekkevoort (Dutch pronunciation: [ˈbɛkəvoːrt]) is a municipality located in the Belgian province of Flemish Brabant. The municipality comprises the towns of Assent, Bekkevoort proper and Molenbeek-Wersbeek. On January 1, 2006, Bekkevoort had a total population of 5,826. The total area is 37.17 km^{2} which gives a population density of 157 inhabitants per km^{2}.

It gains its name from the Germanic name "Baco" and the word "voorde" (which means a place of ferriage, where one can easily cross a stream via a place where the waters are lower), thus roughly meaning "Baco's wade". This ferriage formed the historical center of the town and is nowadays known as the road Steenberg, from Bekkevoort to Zichem and Scherpenheuvel.
