= Herent =

- Municipality
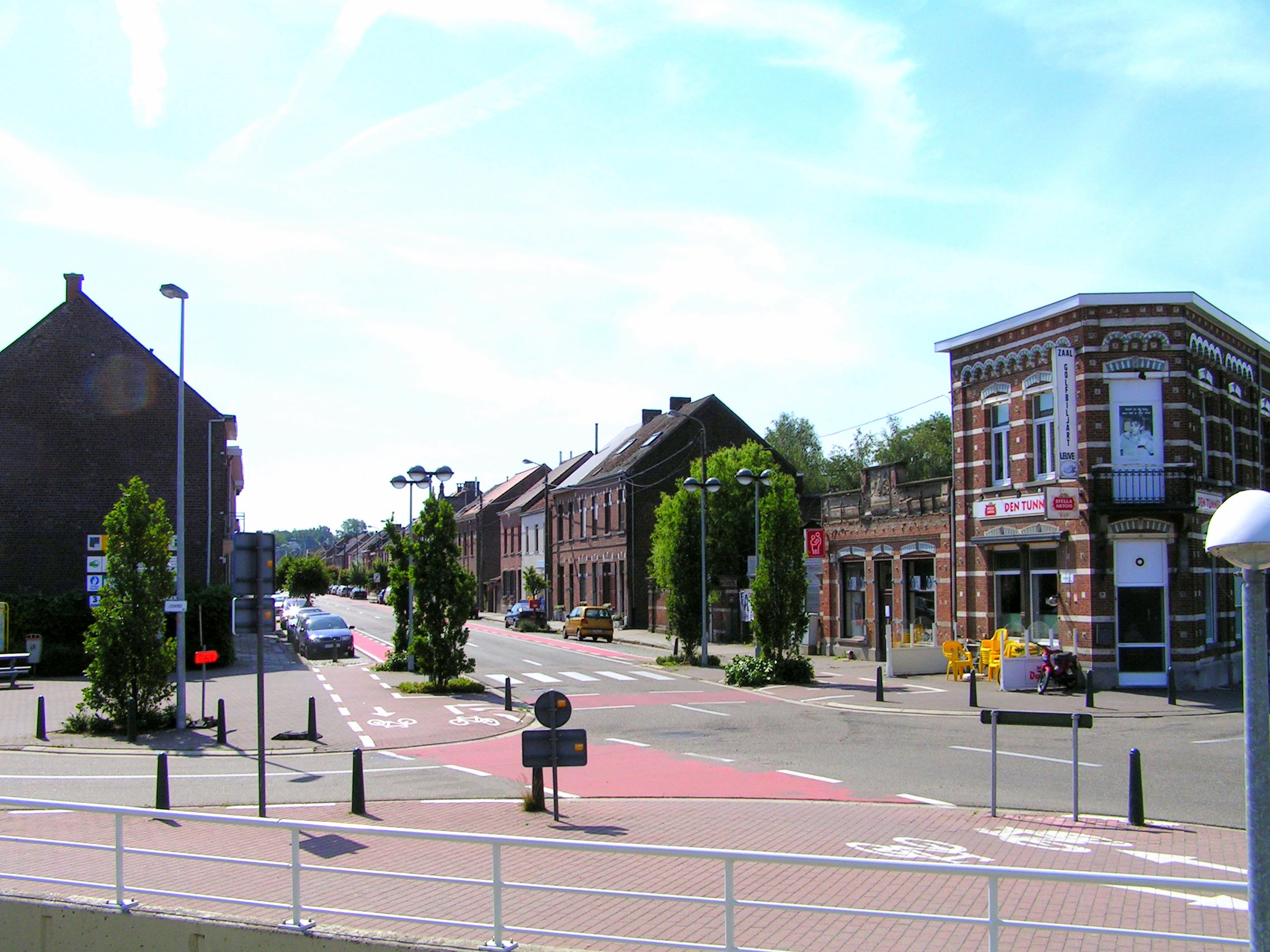

- Flag Coat of arms

- Location of Herent in Flemish Brabant
- Interactive map of Herent
- Location in Belgium
- Coordinates: 50°54′N 04°40′E
- Country: Belgium
- Community: Flemish Community
- Region: Flemish Region
- Province: Flemish Brabant
- Arrondissement: Leuven

Government
  - Mayor: Luk Draye (Pact 3020)
  - Governing party: Pact3020 (Groen–Vooruit coalition) CD&V+

Area
  - Total: 32.74 km^{2} (12.64 sq mi)

Population (2018-01-01)
  - Total: 21,632
  - Density: 660.7/km^{2} (1,711/sq mi)
- Postal codes: 3020
- NIS code: 24038
- Area codes: 016, 02
- Website: www.herent.be

Herent (Dutch pronunciation: [ˈɦeːrənt]) is a municipality located in the Belgian province of Flemish Brabant. The municipality comprises the villages and former municipalities of Herent proper, Veltem-Beisem and Winksele. On January 1, 2025, Herent had a total population of 23,081. The total area is 32.73 km² resulting in a population density of 705,08 inhabitants per km². The current mayor (as of 2024) is Luk Draye (Pact3020).

== Tabel ==
#	Naam	Opp. (km²)	Inwoners (2020)	Inwoners per km²	NIS-code
1	Herent	12,33	12.462	1.011	24038A
2	Veltem-Beisem	9,74	4.752	488	24038C
3	Winksele	10,66	4.702	441	24038B

== Culture and significant landmarks ==
- Kasteel d'Hoogvorst
- Onze-Lieve-Vrouwekerk
- Klooster van Betlehem

== Schools ==
- Catholic schools: De Kraal & Pastoor De Clerckschool
- Public Schools: De Bijenkorf (Flemish Community) & Toverveld (municipal)

== Image gallery ==
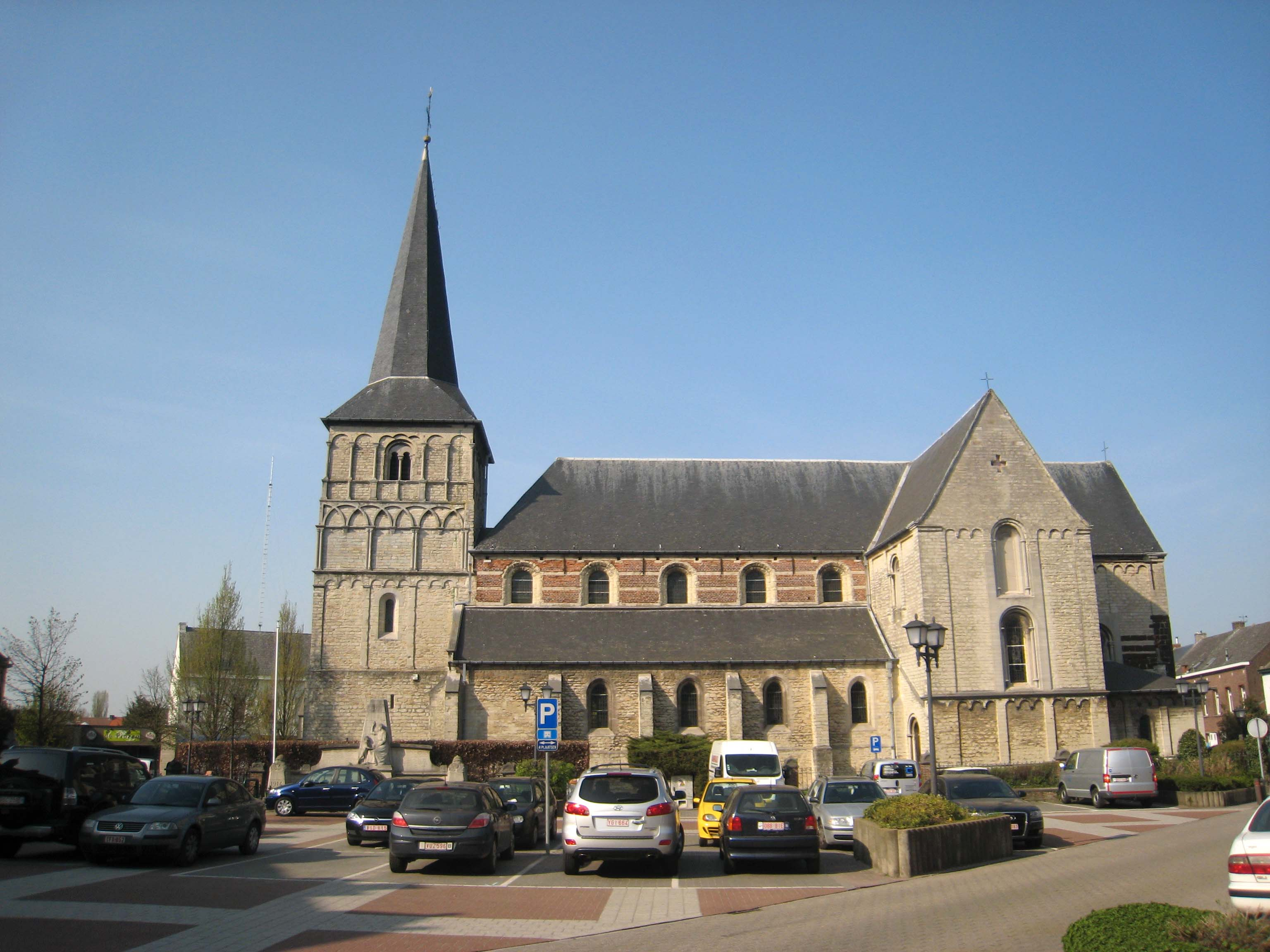
Church in the centre of Herent

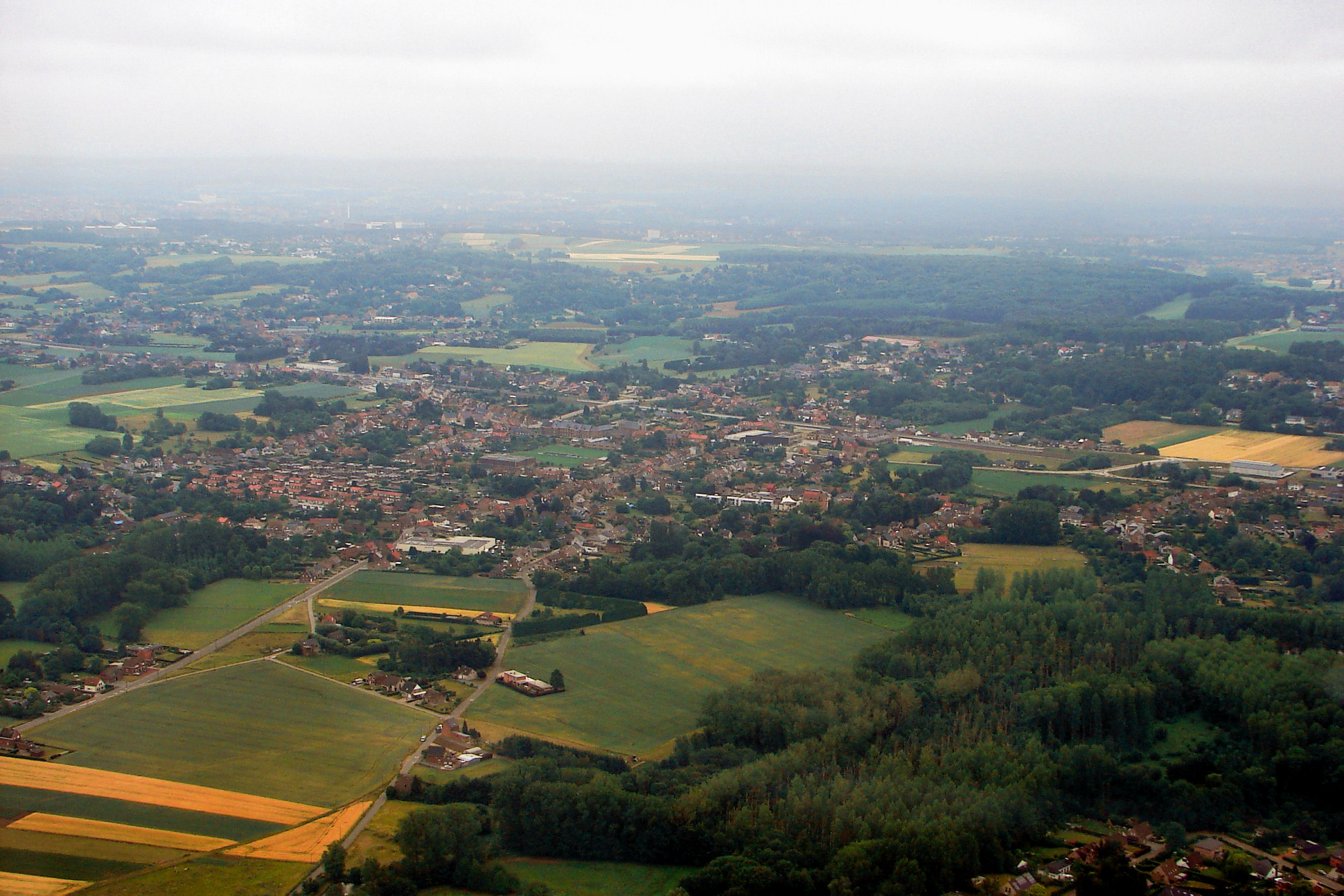
Aerial view of Veltem-Beisem

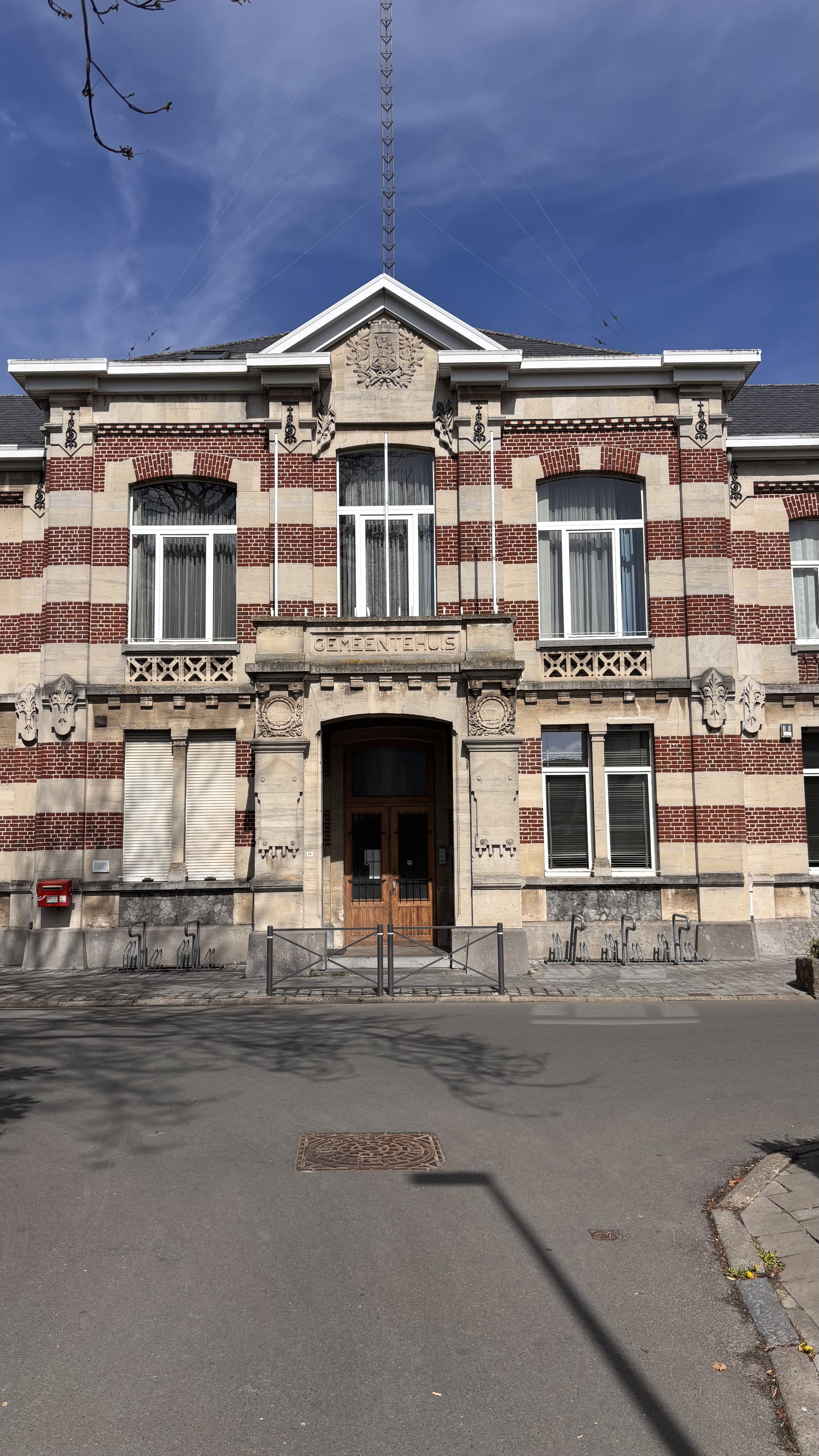
The old town hall of Herent
