= Lummen =

- Municipality
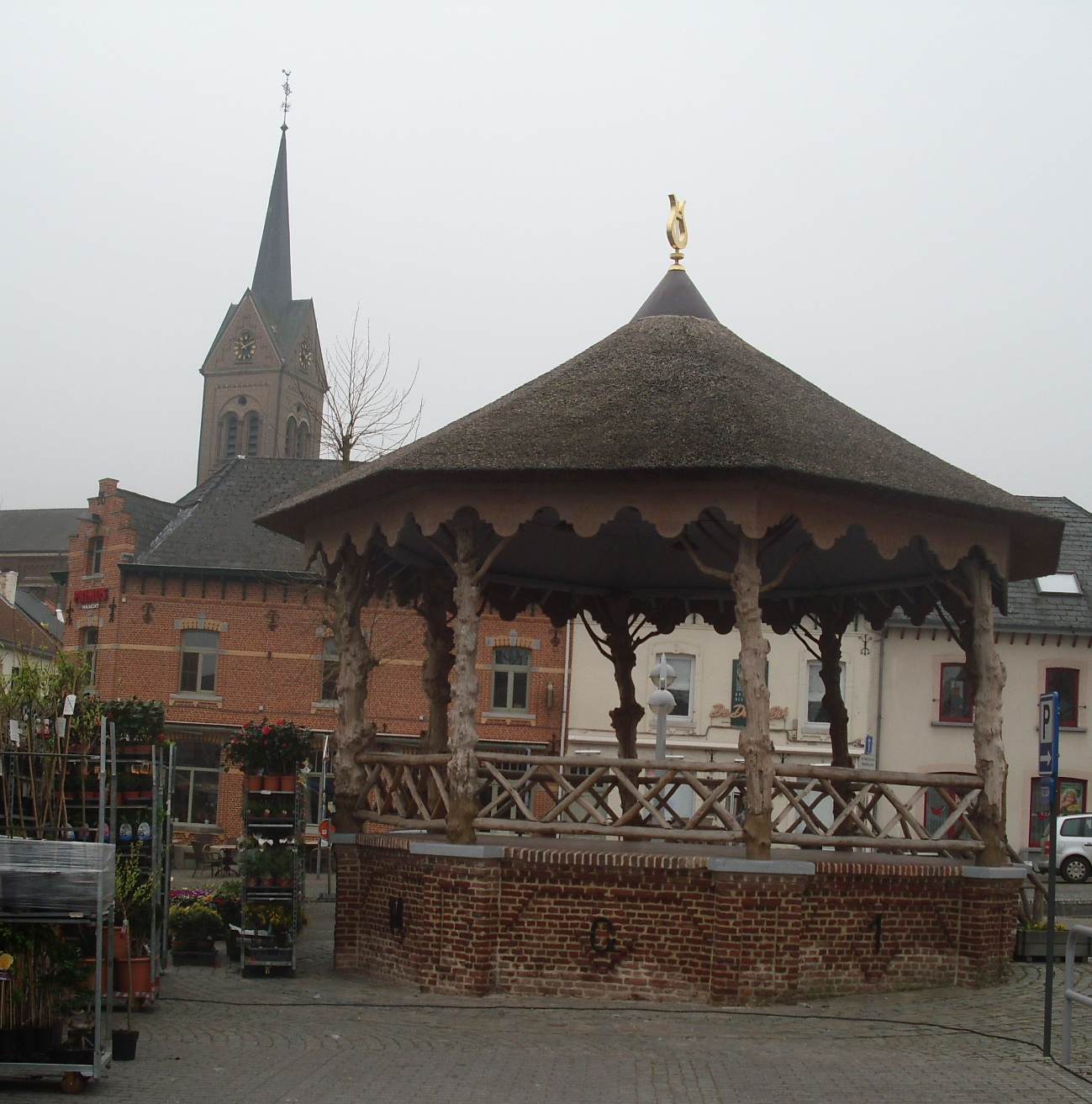

- Flag Coat of arms

- Location of Lummen in Limburg
- Interactive map of Lummen
- Location in Belgium
- Coordinates: 50°59′N 05°12′E
- Country: Belgium
- Community: Flemish Community
- Region: Flemish Region
- Province: Limburg
- Arrondissement: Hasselt

Government
  - Mayor: Luc Wouters (CD&V)
  - Governing parties: CD&V, N-VA

Area
  - Total: 53.7 km^{2} (20.7 sq mi)

Population (2018-01-01)
  - Total: 14,762
  - Density: 275/km^{2} (712/sq mi)
- Postal codes: 3560
- NIS code: 71037
- Area codes: 013, 011
- Website: www.lummen.be

Lummen (Dutch pronunciation: [ˈlʏmə(n)]; Limburgish: Leume [ˈløːmə] or Lumme [ˈlʏmə]) is a municipality located in the Belgian province of Limburg near Hasselt. On January 1, 2006, Lummen had a total population of 13,691. The total area is 53.38 km^{2} which gives a population density of 256 inhabitants per km^{2}.

The municipality consists of the following sub-municipalities: Lummen proper, Meldert en Linkhout. In addition, it includes the following hamlets: Geneiken, Genenbos, Gestel, Goeslaar, Groenlaren, Laren, Mellaer, Molem, Oostereinde, Rekhoven, Schalbroek, and Thiewinkel.

Kasteel Lagendal is situated in this municipality.

The historic coat of arms features the crests of the Houses of Arenberg, La Marck and Arrazola de Oñate. In 2008 however, the municipality chose to use a new logo on its official documents instead.

Originally this was an estate ("villa") of the Prince Bishop of Liège. The core of this (Lummen-Koersel) was one parish until 1180. From the 10th to the 12th centuries, the County of Loon expanded in a northerly direction and seized the villa and the Counts founded an allodium, but in 1203 this area was again transferred to the Prince Bishop and taken on loan. It was given to Lodewijk van Walcourt afterwards. In 1350 Lummen came into possession of the Huis van der Mark-Arenberg. This family remained in possession of the glory until the French period (1794). However, the Dukes of Brabant also claimed to be entitled to a part of Lummen, while the (Loon) lords of Lummen sometimes attempted to found a free state in the area, whereby the Dukes of Brabant tried to sell their rights to these Loon lords several times. . The Heren van Lummen also owned the patronage rights of the parishes in their area, which also included Linkhout and Koersel, and from 1260 also Schulen.

On August 17, 1943, a German fighter plane downed an American B17 bomber of the 94th bomber group over Lummen. The debris of the aircraft ended up in the area of the current Kanadastraat. Six crew members died, two were taken to Germany as prisoners of war and two escaped. A memorial was unveiled on 17 August 2013 in the parking lot of the Oosterhof, near the crash. On February 21, 1945, an Avro Lancaster bomber of the Royal Australian Air Force crashed in the Goeren in Linkhout after being shot by a German night fighter. There was only 1 survivor of the 7 crew members, namely Alex Jenkins, the pilot. There is now a memorial at the site of the crash.

== Etymology ==
The first mention of Lummen dates back to 1200, as Lumm. This originates from the Germanic word lom, which means moist.

== Geography ==
Lummen is situated at the intersection of various regions: geographically, Lummen exhibits characteristics of the Hageland, Haspengouw, and primarily the Kempen. Throughout the municipality of Lummen, flow the rivers Demer, Mangelbeek, and Zwarte Beek.

== Notable people ==
- Hilde Quintens, cyclist
