= N3 road (Belgium) =

Road in Belgium

Coordinates: 50.77754°N 5.24751°E

National Route 3
- Dutch: Nationale Weg 3 French: Route nationale 3
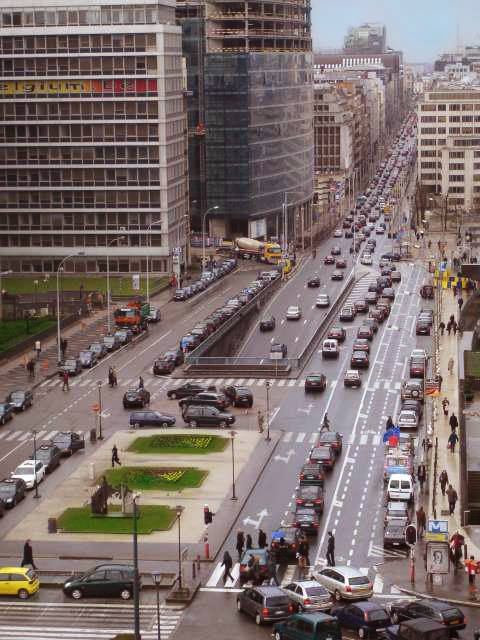
- The Rue de la Loi / Wetstraat in Brussels

Route information
- Length: 136 km (85 mi)

Major junctions
- From: Brussels
- To: Kelmis

Location
- Country: Belgium
- Regions: Brussels-Capital Region; Flemish Brabant; Limburg; Liège
- Major cities: Brussels, Leuven, Tienen, Sint-Truiden, Liège

Highway system
- Highways of Belgium; Motorways; National Roads

The N3 road in Belgium is a national road connecting the capital city Brussels to Aachen in Germany via Leuven, Tienen, Sint-Truiden and Liège. Its course is quite similar to that of European route E40 between Brussels and Aachen, which it intersects 3 times. The road runs through the 3 Belgian regions (Brussels, Flanders and Wallonia) and the 3 communities (Dutch-speaking, French-speaking and German-speaking).

Starting at the small Brussels ring road crossroad Arts-Loi in the City of Brussels, the road is first named Rue de la Loi (direction Brussels centrum) or Rue Belliard (direction Aachen), then enters the Belliard tunnel under the Cinquantenaire park before it becomes the Avenue de Tervueren/Tervurenlaan past the Tervuren gate in Etterbeek. The Avenue de Tervueren then crosses the municipality of Woluwe-Saint-Pierre from the Montgomery Place, passes along the Woluwe and Parmentier parks before it joins the Chaussée de Tervueren/Tervuursesteenweg in Auderghem. Past this intersection, the N3 road comes back to Woluwe-Saint-Pierre where it crosses the Brussels Ring after which it leaves the region of Brussels for Flanders in Tervuren, Flemish Brabant.

Before it arrives to Leuven where it joins the N2 road on the Leuven Ring, the road crosses highways E40 in Bertem and E314 in Heverlee, a borough of Leuven. Between Leuven and Tienen the N3 road runs parallel to the E40 and the railroad Leuven-Tienen. Arriving in Sint-Truiden, the road enters the province of Limburg and leaves it for the Walloon province of Liège at Oreye. It intersects the E40 highway again at Loncin and then runs through the city centre of Liège and crosses the river Meuse there. Going north-east the road intersects the E40 for the 3rd time in Soumagne. The N3 finally crosses 2 municipalities of the German-speaking community (Lontzen and Kelmis). From Kelmis the German city of Aachen can be joined via the German road B264.

The N3 crosses or borders 31 municipalities in the country. 4 of them are in the Brussels Capital Region, 12 in Flemish Brabant, 2 in Limburg and 14 in Liège. Full municipality list below, with main municipalities in bold.

Region	Province	Municipality	Population	Length of N3 (km)
Brussels Capital Region	/	**City of Brussels**	188737	1.9
Brussels Capital Region	/	Etterbeek	48535	0.8
Brussels Capital Region	/	Woluwe-Saint-Pierre	42216	5.2
Brussels Capital Region	/	Auderghem	34986	0.9
Flanders	Flemish Brabant	**Tervuren**	22852	8.4
Flanders	Flemish Brabant	Kraainem	13928	0.1
Flanders	Flemish Brabant	Wezembeek-Oppem	14488	0.3
Flanders	Flemish Brabant	Bertem	10258	6.7
Flanders	Flemish Brabant	**Leuven**	102236	8.1
Flanders	Flemish Brabant	Bierbeek	10277	4.9
Flanders	Flemish Brabant	Boutersem	8386	5.0
Flanders	Flemish Brabant	**Tienen**	35973	11.0
Flanders	Flemish Brabant	Linter	7276	4.7
Flanders	Flemish Brabant	Zoutleeuw	8591	4.4
Flanders	Limburg	**Sint-Truiden**	40845	11.4
Flanders	Limburg	Heers	7457	5.6
Wallonia	Liège	Oreye	4001	2.9
Wallonia	Liège	Crisnée	3517	4.7
Wallonia	Liège	Awans	9152	5.5
Wallonia	Liège	Ans	28625	4.8
Wallonia	Liège	**Liège**	195278	8.0
Wallonia	Liège	Beyne-Heusay	11948	2.5
Wallonia	Liège	Fléron	16235	3.3
Wallonia	Liège	Soumagne	17287	4.0
Wallonia	Liège	Herve	17674	5.9
Wallonia	Liège	Thimister-Clermont	5608	5.2
Wallonia	Liège	Welkenraedt	10428	6.2
Wallonia	Liège	Lontzen	5947	2.8
Wallonia	Liège	Plombières	10682	2.5
Wallonia	Liège	Kelmis	11229	4.6

== Junction list ==
Province	Municipality	Section	Junction	Eastbound destinations	Westbound destinations
(European Union) (Belgium) Brussels-capital Region	City of Brussels	Brussels- Auderghem	Brussels (188.737 inh.) R20 Brussels inner ring road N295 Merode, Woluwe-Saint-Lambert Belliard Tunnel N23, E40 Brussels Ring, Liège, Antwerp (E19), Leuven, Brussels Airport Cinquantenaire Tunnel	Tervuren Leuven	Brussels
(European Union) (Belgium) Brussels-capital Region	Etterbeek	Brussels- Auderghem	/	Tervuren Leuven	Brussels
(European Union) (Belgium) Brussels-capital Region	Woluwe-Saint-Pierre	Brussels- Auderghem	R21 Atomium, Schaerbeek, Evere, Etterbeek Tervurentunnel N226 Woluwe-Saint-Lambert Woluwe-Saint-Pierre (42.216 inh.) R22 Woluwe-Saint-Lambert, Auderghem, Watermael-Boitsfort, Kraainem, Zaventem, Brussels Airport	Tervuren Leuven	Brussels
(European Union) (Belgium) Brussels-capital Region	Auderghem	Brussels- Auderghem	N281 Auderghem	Tervuren Leuven	Brussels
(European Union) (Belgium) / Brussels-capital Region / Flanders Flemish Brabant	Woluwe-Saint-Pierre / Tervuren	Brussels- Auderghem	The N3 forms the border between Woluwe-Saint-Pierre and Tervuren and between the Brussels Capital Region and Flanders.	Tervuren Leuven	Brussels
(European Union) (Belgium) Flanders Flemish Brabant	Tervuren	Tervuren - Leuven	R0, Brussels Ring Waterloo, Brussels Airport, Liège (E40), Leuven (E40), Ghent (E40), Antwerp (E19), Charleroi (E19), Mons (E19), Namur (E411), Tournai (E429)	Leuven	Brussels
(European Union) (Belgium) Flanders Flemish Brabant	Kraainem	Tervuren - Leuven	/	Leuven	Brussels
(European Union) (Belgium) Flanders Flemish Brabant	Tervuren	Tervuren - Leuven	Tervuren (22.852 inh.)	Leuven	Brussels
(European Union) (Belgium) Flanders Flemish Brabant	Tervuren / Wezembeek-Oppem	Tervuren - Leuven	The N3 forms the border between Tervuren and Wezembeek-Oppem.	Leuven	Brussels
(European Union) (Belgium) Flanders Flemish Brabant	Tervuren	Tervuren - Leuven	Vossem (3.810 inh.)	Leuven	Brussels
(European Union) (Belgium) Flanders Flemish Brabant	Bertem	Tervuren - Leuven	Leefdaal (4.487 inh.) 22 (Bertem) E40 Brussels, Leuven, Liège, Genk (E314), Hasselt (E314) Bertem (10.258 inh.)	Leuven	Tervuren Brussels
(European Union) (Belgium) Flanders Flemish Brabant	Leuven	Leuven	N253 Egenhoven, Korbeek-Dijle, Huldenberg, Overijse Terbank R23, Leuven ring road Leuven, Brussels, Tervuren, Wavre, Namur, Tienen, Diest, Aarschot, Mechelen Start of concurrency with R23 Leuven (102.236 inh.) N264 Egenhoven, Brussels (E40), Genk (E314), Hasselt (E314) Dijle N251 Heverlee, Oud-Heverlee, Wavre (N25), Namur (N91) End of concurrency with R23 R23, Leuven ring road Leuven, Brussels, Tervuren, Wavre, Namur, Tienen, Diest, Aarschot, Mechelen N292 Leuven railway station, Diest N25 Haasrode, Oud-Heverlee, Wavre, Namur (N91)	Tienen Liège	Tervuren Brussels
(European Union) (Belgium) Flanders Flemish Brabant	Bierbeek	Leuven - Tienen	Korbeek-Lo (3.676 inh.) Lovenjoel (2.206 inh.)	Tienen Liège	Leuven Brussels
(European Union) (Belgium) Flanders Flemish Brabant	Boutersem	Leuven - Tienen	Boutersem (8.386 inh.) N234 Tielt-Winge, Opvelp, Beauvechain Roosbeek (1.892 inh.)	Sint-Truiden Liège	Leuven Brussels
(European Union) (Belgium) Flanders Flemish Brabant	Tienen	Tienen	Kumtich (2.913 inh.) R27 Sint-Truiden, Linter, Hoegaarden, Hannut, Charleroi, Namur Tienen (35.973 inh.) N223 Vissenaken, Lubbeek, Tielt-Winge, Aarschot N29 Glabbeek, Bekkevoort, Diest Start of concurrency with N29 End of concurrency with N29 N29 Hoegaarden, Jodoigne, Charleroi R27 Hoegaarden, Hannut, Charleroi, Leuven, Namur Hakendover (1.385 inh.)	Sint-Truiden Liège	Leuven Brussels
(European Union) (Belgium) Flanders Flemish Brabant	Linter	Tienen - Zoutleeuw	Orsmaal-Gussenhoven (915 inh.) N279, N283 Hélécine, Landen, Hannut	Sint-Truiden Liège	Tienen Leuven
(European Union) (Belgium) Flanders Flemish Brabant	Zoutleeuw	Tienen - Zoutleeuw	Dormaal (780 inh.) Halle-Booienhoven (1.943 inh.)	Sint-Truiden Liège	Tienen Leuven
(European Union) (Belgium) Flanders Limburg	Sint-Truiden	Sint-Truiden - Heers	Wilderen (1.464 inh.) N3e Sint-Truiden-Center Sint-Truiden (40.845 inh.) N80 Gingelom, Landen, Hannut, Namur, Hasselt N3e Sint-Truiden-Center Brustem (2.679 inh.) N759 Brustem, Zepperen N789 Aalst, Jeuk Engelmanshoven (409 inh.) Gelinden (1.492 inh.)	Liège	Tienen Leuven
(European Union) (Belgium) Flanders Limburg	Heers	Sint-Truiden - Heers	Klein-Gelmen (519 inh.) N743 Mechelen-Bovelingen, Waremme Heers (7.457 inh.) N784 Opheers, Veulen, Waremme, Borgloon	Liège	Sint-Truiden
(European Union) (Belgium) Wallonia Liège	Oreye	Oreye - Liège	N69 Tongeren, Waremme Oreye (4.001 inh.)	Liège	Sint-Truiden
(European Union) (Belgium) Wallonia Liège	Crisnée	Oreye - Liège	Crisnée (3.517 inh.) N614 Herstappe, Tongeren, Fexhe-le-Haut-Clocher, Saint-Georges-sur-Meuse	Liège	Sint-Truiden
(European Union) (Belgium) Wallonia Liège	Awans	Oreye - Liège	Villers-L'Évêque (1.796 inh.) Hognoul (1.294 inh.)	Liège	Sint-Truiden
(European Union) (Belgium) Wallonia Liège	Ans	Oreye - Liège	Loncin (3.060 inh.) Ans (28.625 inh.) N682 Saint-Nicolas	Liège	Sint-Truiden
(European Union) (Belgium) Wallonia Liège	Liège	Liège	Glain (3.075 inh.) N637 Glain, Saint-Nicolas, Grâce-Hollogne, Liège Airport N617a Liège-Center, Liège-Guillemins railway station, Seraing, Flémalle, Huy Liège (192.278 inh.) N671 Herstal, Liège-Center Meuse N610 Droixhe, Liège-Guillemins railway station Meuse N90 Visé, Verviers, Seraing, Huy, Namur Bressoux (12.214 inh.) Grivegnée (21.034 inh.) N665 Grivegnée, Chênée, Chaudfontaine	Germany (Aachen)	Sint-Truiden
(European Union) (Belgium) Wallonia Liège	Beyne-Heusay	Liège - Kelmis	Beyne-Heusay (11.948 inh.)	Germany (Aachen)	Liège
(European Union) (Belgium) Wallonia Liège	Fléron	Liège - Kelmis	N621 Romsée, Vaux-sous-Chèvremont, Chaudfontaine Fléron (16.235 inh.) N673 Trooz N621 Ayeneux, Olne, Soumagne-Bas	Germany (Aachen)	Liège
(European Union) (Belgium) Wallonia Liège	Soumagne	Liège - Kelmis	Micheroux (1.590 inh.) N604 Barchon, Visé Soumagne (17.287 inh.) 37 (Herve) E40, E42 Liège, Brussels, Verviers, Eupen, Germany (Aachen)	Germany (Aachen)	Liège
(European Union) (Belgium) Wallonia Liège	Herve	Liège - Kelmis	N621 Soumagne-Bas, Olne Herve (17.674 inh.) Battice (5.685 inh.) N627 Dison, Verviers, Visé N648 Aubel E42 Verviers, Malmedy, St. Vith, Germany (Trier, Saarbrücken)	Germany (Aachen)	Liège
(European Union) (Belgium) Wallonia Liège	Thimister-Clermont	Liège - Kelmis	Thimister (3.141 inh.) Clermont-sur-Berwinne (2.467 inh.)	Germany (Aachen)	Liège
(European Union) (Belgium) Wallonia Liège	Welkenraedt	Liège - Kelmis	Henri-Chapelle (2.780 inh.) N67 Welkenraedt-Center, Eupen	Germany (Aachen)	Liège
(European Union) (Belgium) Wallonia Liège	Welkenraedt / Lontzen	Liège - Kelmis	The N3 forms the border between Welkenraedt and Lontzen. Mützhagen	Germany (Aachen)	Liège
(European Union) (Belgium) Wallonia Liège	Plombières / Lontzen	Liège - Kelmis	The N3 forms the border between Plombières and Lontzen. Birken	Germany (Aachen)	Liège
(European Union) (Belgium) Wallonia Liège	Plombières / Kelmis	Liège - Kelmis	The N3 forms the border between Plombières and Kelmis. N613 Plombières, Moresnet	Germany (Aachen)	Liège
(European Union) (Belgium) Wallonia Liège	Kelmis	Liège - Kelmis	Kelmis (11.229 inh.) Neu-Moresnet (2.798 inh.)	Germany (Aachen)	Liège
(European Union) (Germany) (North Rhine-Westphalia)	Continuation by B264 towards Aachen				

== See also ==
- Transport in Belgium
