= List of motte-and-bailey castles in Belgium =

This list gives an overview of motte-and-bailey castles in Belgium with a motte that is still visible and that hasn't been completely levelled or disappeared. This list is not exhaustive.

List of motte castles in Belgium
Province	Location	Town	Name	Heritage	Coordinates	Image
Antwerp	Bornem	Bornem	Den Dulft	106091	51.09532°N 4.23001°E	
Antwerp	Brecht	Brecht	Waterhoeve		51.35048°N 4.64652°E	
Antwerp	Westmeerbeek	Hulshout	Oud Hof ter Borgt		51.06373°N 4.83740°E	
Antwerp	Kontich	Kontich	Motte bij Neerhoeve	13524	51.12256°N 4.44522°E	
Antwerp	Kontich	Kontich	Motte van Boutersem	140145	51.13617°N 4.46230°E	
Antwerp	Poederlee	Lille	Ouden Hofberg		51.21245°N 4.83844°E	
Antwerp	Ranst	Ranst	Zevenbergen		51.19505°N 4.55644°E	
Brussels	Boitsfort	Watermael-Boitsfort	Hondenberg		50.79729°N 4.41621°E	
East Flanders	Moorsel	Aalst	Hof te Eksel	307758	50.94354°N 4.09388°E	
East Flanders	Teralfene	Affligem	Alvinneberg		50.88974°N 4.09009°E	
East Flanders	Beveren-Waas	Beveren	Singelberg	8410	51.23531°N 4.24479°E	
East Flanders	Liedekerke	Denderleeuw	Kasteelberg		50.87239°N 4.07857°E	
East Flanders	Erpe	Erpe-Mere	Kasteelberg	95739	50.93515°N 3.97576°E	
East Flanders	Ertvelde	Evergem	Hoge Wal	10965	51.17093°N 3.74088°E	
East Flanders	Heldergem	Haaltert	Boonhof	307844	50.88556°N 3.94663°E	
East Flanders	Ressegem	Herzele	Motte De Wal	9251	50.89170°N 3.91194°E	
East Flanders	Munte	Merelbeke	Kalvarieberg	8709	50.94360°N 3.74175°E	
East Flanders	Bevere	Oudenaarde	Hof de Bruwaan		50.86144°N 3.58462°E	
East Flanders	Mullem	Oudenaarde	Klein Kasteeltje		50.89581°N 3.60319°E	
East Flanders	Kemzeke	Stekene	Alvinusberg		51.2221°N 4.0579°E	
East Flanders	Roborst	Zwalm	Motte van Roborst	11029	50.86424°N 3.75640°E	
Flemish Brabant	Bever	Bever	Burght		50.71992°N 3.91917°E	
Flemish Brabant	Butsel	Boutersem	Motte	122	50.84022°N 4.84785°E	
Flemish Brabant	Diest	Diest	Tafelrondemotte	553	50.98539°N 5.05819°E	
Flemish Brabant	Groot-Bijgaarden	Dilbeek	Donjon	1304	50.87331°N 4.26359°E	
Flemish Brabant	Geetbets	Geetbets	Motte		50.88851°N 5.11848°E	
Flemish Brabant	Borgt	Grimbergen	Senecaberg	43943	50.9280°N 4.4088°E	
Flemish Brabant	Sint-Agatha-Rode	Huldenberg	Motte		50.78644°N 4.63596°E	
Flemish Brabant	Waanrode	Kortenberg	Motte	134195	50.91314°N 4.99493°E	
Flemish Brabant	Landen	Landen	Hunsberg	1301	50.74817°N 5.06568°E	
Flemish Brabant	Landen	Landen	Tombe van Pepijn	1296	50.74716°N 5.06267°E	
Flemish Brabant	Rumsdorp	Landen	Motte van Rumsdorp	571	50.76788°N 5.07616°E	
Flemish Brabant	Wange	Landen	Motte van Wange	1340	50.78715°N 5.03003°E	
Flemish Brabant	Londerzeel	Londerzeel	Motte De Burcht	962	51.00180°N 4.30054°E	
Flemish Brabant	Lubbeek	Lubbeek	Hof ter Hove/Stakenberg		50.8860°N 4.8457°E	
Flemish Brabant	Sint-Brixius-Rode	Meise	De Borcht	45663	50.96047°N 4.33390°E	
Flemish Brabant	Merchtem	Merchtem	Hunsberg		50.95189°N 4.26528°E	
Flemish Brabant	Merchtem	Merchtem	Burcht	36014	50.95873°N 4.23470°E	
Flemish Brabant	Tielt	Tielt-Winge	Motte Butsberg		50.93797°N 4.91548°E	
Flemish Brabant	Zoutleeuw	Zoutleeuw	Castelberg		50.84355°N 5.12407°E	
Hainaut	Warneton	Comines-Warneton	Montagne du Château		50.75404°N 2.95432°E	
Hainaut	Enghien	Enghien	Motte de Brabant	55010-CLT-0016-01	50.69351°N 4.04242°E	
Hainaut	Labliau	Enghien	Motte		50.6652°N 3.9873°E	
Hainaut	Marcq	Enghien	Motte de Bornival		50.69414°N 4.01614°E	
Hainaut	Petit-Engien	Enghien	Motte de Strihoux		50.70774°N 4.08567°E	
Hainaut	Nechin	Estaimpuis	Château de la Royère		50.67572°N 3.27587°E	
Hainaut	Quaregnon	Quaregnon	Catiau du Diable	53065-CLT-0004-01	50.4449°N 3.8634°E	
Hainaut	Hoves	Silly	Motte féodale	55039-CLT-0007-016	50.67056°N 4.03441°E	
Liège	Fooz	Awans	Motte féodale de Fooz	62006-INV-0010-01	50.67941°N 5.43842°E	
Liège	Ville-en-Hesbaye	Braives	Motte		50.61603°N 5.11549°E	
Liège	Haneffe	Donceel	Montagne du Maison forte		50.63873°N 5.31768°E	
Liège	Celles	Faimes	Motte féodale	64076-CLT-0001-01	50.66318°N 5.25993°E	
Liège	Les Waleffes	Faimes	Motte féodale		50.64010°N 5.21942°E	
Liège	Omal	Geer	Motte d’Omal	64029-CLT-0021-01	50.65812°N 5.19689°E	
Liège	Hannut	Hannut	Petit Bosquet	64034-CLT-0015-01	50.67058°N 5.07614°E	
Liège	Avin	Hannut	Motte d'Atrive		50.628802°N 5.075491°E	
Liège	Liers	Herstal	Motte féodale de Liers	62051-CLT-0006-01	50.69380°N 5.56490°E	
Liège	Lamine	Remicourt	Motte castrale de Lamine	64063-CLT-0004-01	50.68945°N 5.33610°E	
Liège	Fize-Fontaine	Villers-le-Bouillet	Motte		50.58605°N 5.27849°E	
Liège	Vieux-Waleffe	Villers-le-Bouillet	Motte féodale			
Liège	Warnant-Dreye	Villers-le-Bouillet	Ferme des Burettes		50.59605°N 5.23390°E	
Limburg	Terkoest	Alken	Mot	31701	50.89312°N 5.27891°E	
Limburg	Beverst	Bilzen	Schuylenborg mot		50.88753°N 5.46970°E	
Limburg	Grote-Spouwen	Bilzen	Heuvel		50.83362°N 5.55233°E	
Limburg	Borgloon	Borgloon	Burcht van Loon	1916	50.80089°N 5.34399°E	
Limburg	Waterschei	Genk	Motteruïne Stalengoed		50.98724°N 5.51510°E	
Limburg	Hasselt	Hasselt	Henegauw		50.89432°N 5.35076°E	
Limburg	Kuringen	Hasselt	Prinsenhof	20913	50.94437°N 5.30862°E	
Limburg	Stevoort	Hasselt	Asberg		50.90673°N 5.22867°E	
Limburg	Horpmaal	Heers	Motte hill	32110	50.75602°N 5.33628°E	
Limburg	Hoeselt	Hoeselt	Mot	3197	50.85178°N 5.48446°E	
Limburg	Romershoven	Hoeselt	Blokkes-motte		50.85718°N 5.46265°E	
Limburg	Werm	Hoeselt	Tom		50.83406°N 5.48007°E	
Limburg	Kessenich	Kinrooi	Motte of Kessenich	3206	51.15054°N 5.82430°E	
Limburg	Gellik	Lanaken	Motte in de Burg	3223	50.88067°N 5.60943°E	
Limburg	Millen	Riemst	Toem	3643	50.78689°N 5.56235°E	
Limburg	Brustem	Sint-Truiden	Torenburcht	3393	50.801667°N 5.2175°E	
Limburg	Zepperen	Sint-Truiden	Natenbampt		50.84662°N 5.25229°E	
Limburg	Kolmont	Tongeren	Burcht van Kolmont	37528	50.79931°N 5.42297°E	
Limburg	Mulken	Tongeren	Burchttoren van Mulken	37425	50.78984°N 5.44467°E	
Limburg	Rutten	Tongeren	Mot	2050	50.74600°N 5.44635°E	
Limburg	Wellen	Wellen	Mot		50.85304°N 5.34570°E	
Luxembourg	Heinstert	Attert	Burgknapp		49.75175°N 5.72640°E	
Luxembourg	Bouillon	Bouillon	Beaumont La ramonette		49.78941°N 5.06271°E	
Luxembourg	Buzenol	Étalle	Montauban-motte	85009-CLT-0001-01	49.62913°N 5.59415°E	
Luxembourg	Bodange	Fauvillers	Alt Schlass (Vieux Château)		49.8618°N 5.6904°E	
Luxembourg	Mellier	Léglise	Haut-de-la-Cour-motte	84033-CLT-0001-01	49.7683°N 5.5177°E	
Luxembourg	Marcourt	Rendeux	Motte de l'Ermitage Saint-Thibaut		50.20989°N 5.51676°E	
Luxembourg	Mirwart	Saint-Hubert	Mirwart Castle	84059-CLT-0006-01	50.05466°N 5.25784°E	
Namur	Aublain	Couvin	Motte féodale		50.06575°N 4.41386°E	
Namur	Liernu	Eghézée	Motte Del Rigadrie		50.58398°N 4.83313°E	
Namur	Haltinne	Gesves	Motte	92054-CLT-0014-01	50.45058°N 5.07512°E	
Namur	Petite-Hour	Houyet	Château de Hour	91072-INV-0226-01	50.17048°N 5.02739°E	
Namur	Sugny	Vresse-sur-Semois	Tchesté de la Rotche		49.83156°N 4.89923°E	
Walloon Brabant	Braine-le-Château	Braine-le-Château	Les Monts	25015-CLT-0013-01	50.68670°N 4.26038°E	
Walloon Brabant	Nethen	Grez-Doiceau	Motte de Nethen	25037-CLT-0013-01	50.78429°N 4.67566°E	
Walloon Brabant	Lasne	Lasne	Motte		50.6857°N 4.4894°E	
West Flanders	Dudzele	Bruges	Schottenhof	74577	51.27511°N 3.23415°E	
West Flanders	Oostkerke	Damme	Hof van Lembeke		51.26920°N 3.30458°E	
West Flanders	Oostkerke	Damme	Ten Doele	69603	51.29799°N 3.30083°E	
West Flanders	Oostkerke	Damme	Motte ‘t Wallant	30605	51.28548°N 3.28797°E	
West Flanders	Gistel	Gistel	Godelievemotte	52002	51.15045°N 2.92647°E	
West Flanders	Loker	Heuvelland	Galooie-Mote	12394	50.77767°N 2.77043°E	
West Flanders	Merkem	Houthulst	Hoge Mote	28583	50.95826°N 2.89410°E	
West Flanders	Werken	Kortemark	Hogen Andjoen	11772	51.02876°N 2.96168°E	
West Flanders	Werken	Kortemark	Vrouwhillewal	49443	51.04863°N 2.98346°E	
West Flanders	Reningelst	Poperinge	Motte van kasteel van Reningelst	13466	50.81659°N 2.7648°E	
West Flanders	Spiere	Spiere-Helkijn	Cave aux diables	13109	50.72809°N 3.34906°E	
West Flanders	Veurne	Veurne	Warandemotte		51.07231°N 2.66040°E	
