= A3 motorway (Belgium) =

Motorway in Belgium

A3
- Dutch: Autosnelweg 3 French: Autoroute 3
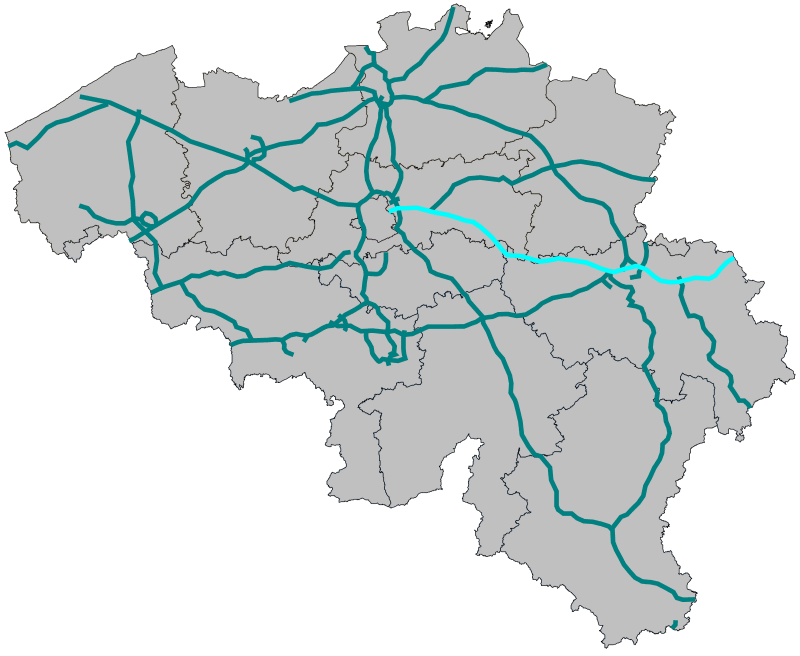

Route information
- Part of E25 E40 E42
- Maintained by the Roads and Traffic Agency of the Brussels-Capital Region, Flemish government and Walloon Government
- Length: 134 km (83 mi)

Major junctions
- West end: R21 / N23 in Brussels
- 19 Evere N294 20 Kraainem R22; Sint.-Stevens-Woluwe junction R0; 21 Steenokkerzeel/Sterrebeek N227; 22 Tervuren N3; Leuven junction E314 / A2; 23 Haasrode-Blanden/Waver N25; 24 Boutersem N234; 25 Tienen N29; 26 Jodoigne/Orp-Jauche N222 / N279; 27 Huy/Lincent N64; 28 Hannuit/St-Truiden N80; 28a Geer N615; 29 Waremme N69; 30 St-Georges-s/M N614; 31; Loncin junction E25 / A602 / E42 / A15; 32 Alleur; 33 Rocourt/Tongres N20; Vottem junction E313 / A13 / N655; A601 / E313 / A13; 34 Hermée; 35 Oupeye N671; Cheratte junction E25 / A25; 36 Blégny N604 / N642; 37 Herve N3; Battice junction E42 / A27 / N3 / N648; 37bis Thimister-Clermont; 37t East Belgium Park; 38 Eupen/Welkenraedt N67; 39 Aachen-Süd/Eynatten N68 40 Lichtenbusch
- East end: A 44 at German border near Aachen

Location
- Country: Belgium

Highway system
- Highways of Belgium; Motorways; National Roads

The A3 is a Belgian motorway (mainly classified as the E40) extending from the east of Brussels (Boulevard Reyers), through Leuven, onwards to Liège. Just past the ring of Liège, the motorway continues to Verviers, Eupen and the German border.

The section between Liège (intersection of Hauts-Sarts) and the German border is part of the King Baudouin Motorway (Baldwin König Autobahn in German and Koning Boudewijnsnelweg in Dutch). Crossing the Hesbaye (French) or Haspengouw (Dutch), the Walloon section between Leuven and Liège is named the Hesbignonne.

== Pictures ==
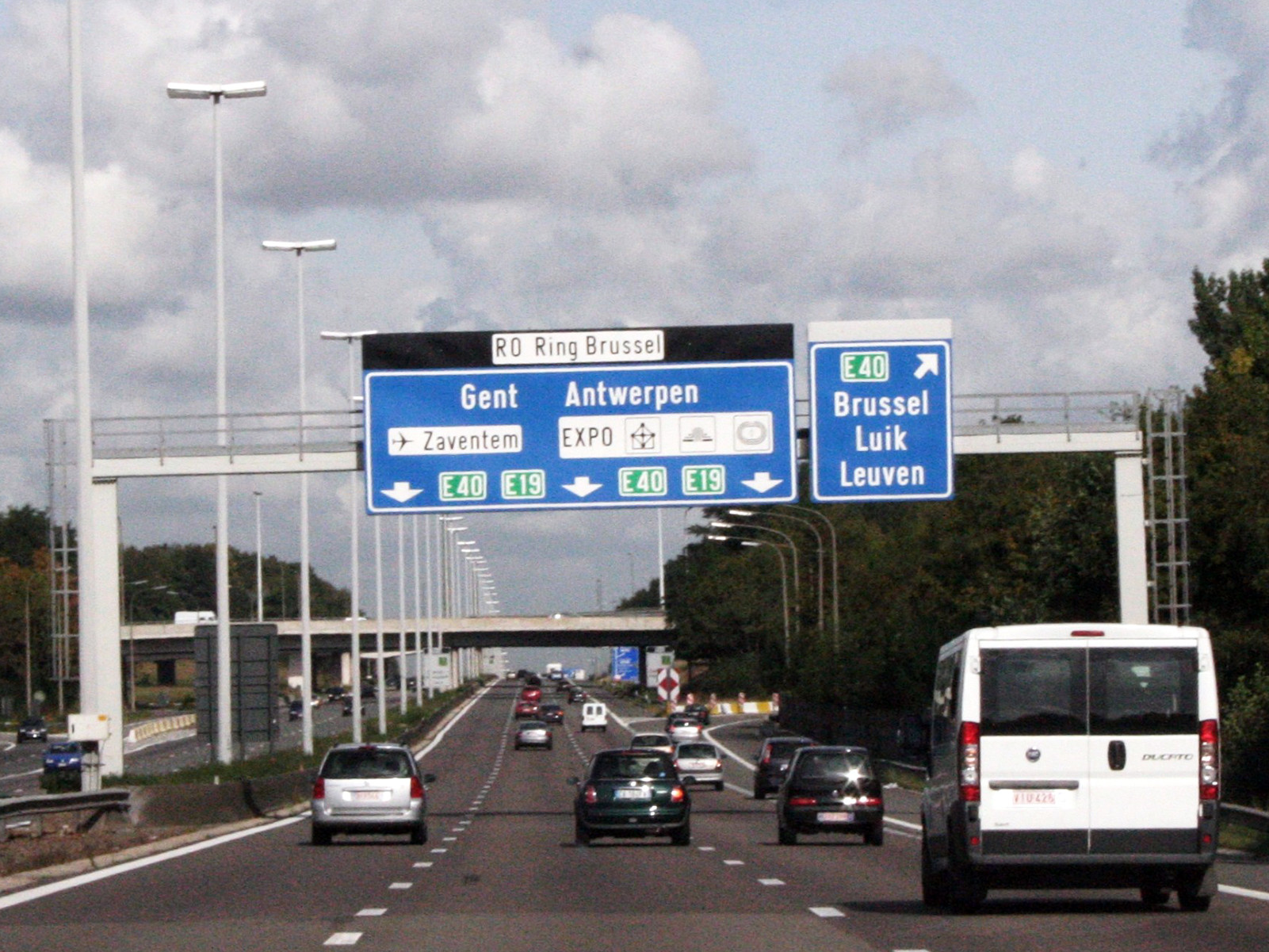
The A3 near Sint-Stevens-Woluwe

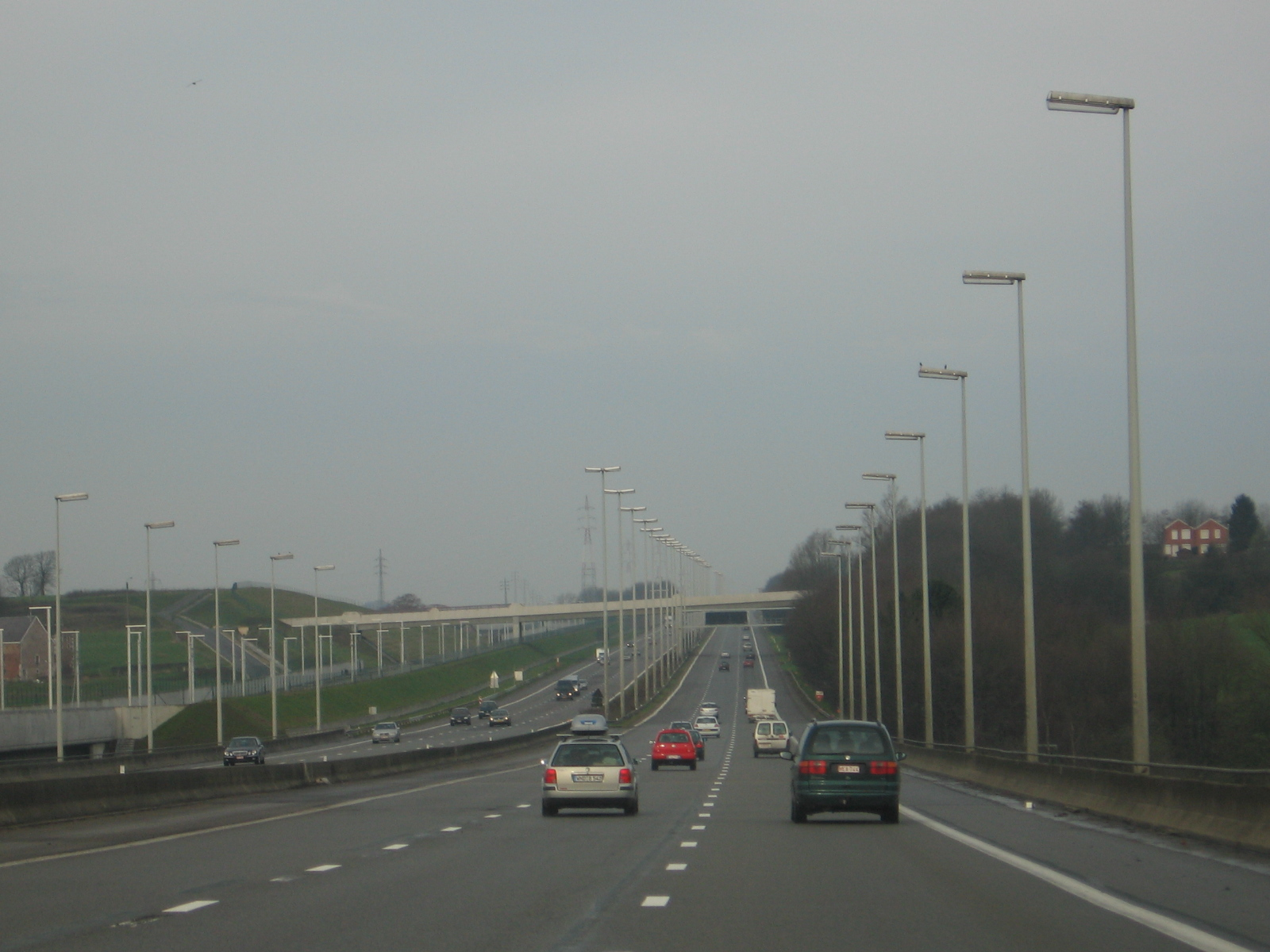
The A3 near Herve.

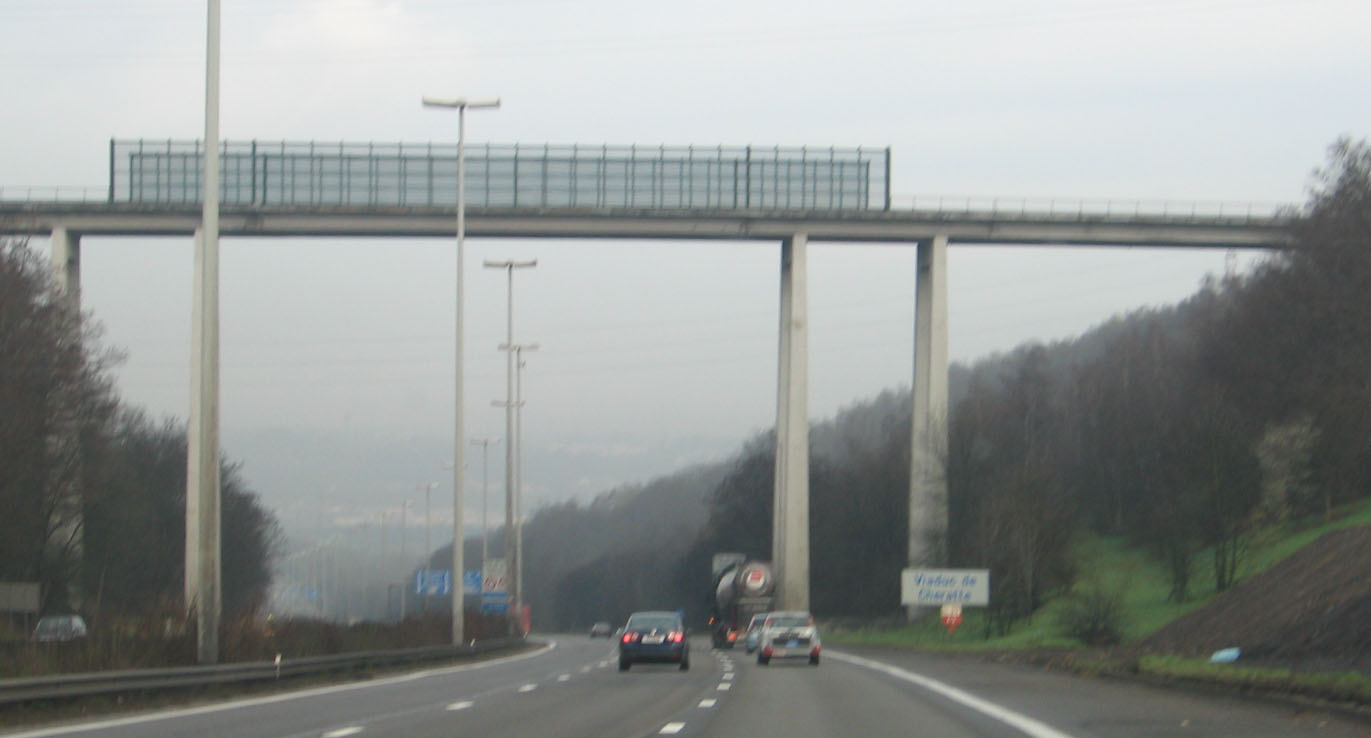
Viaduct of Cheratte.

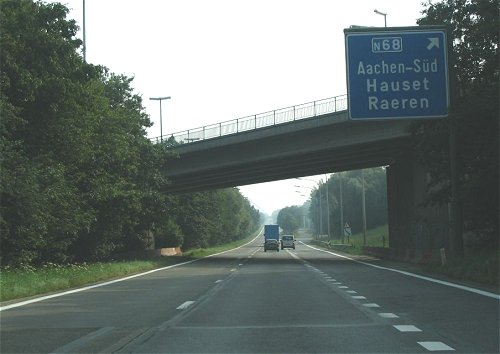
Exit 39 - Eynatten.

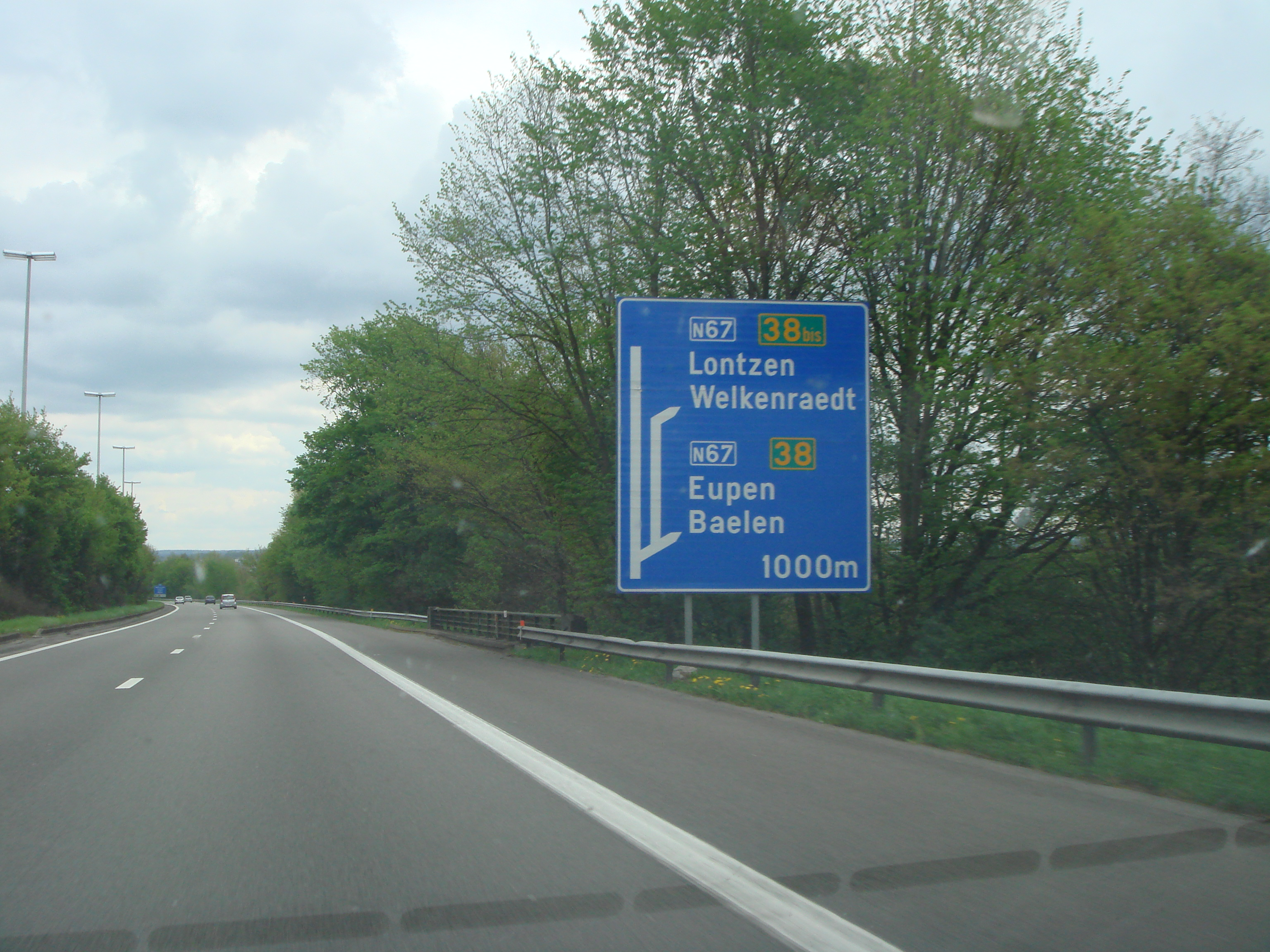
Exit 38 - Eupen.

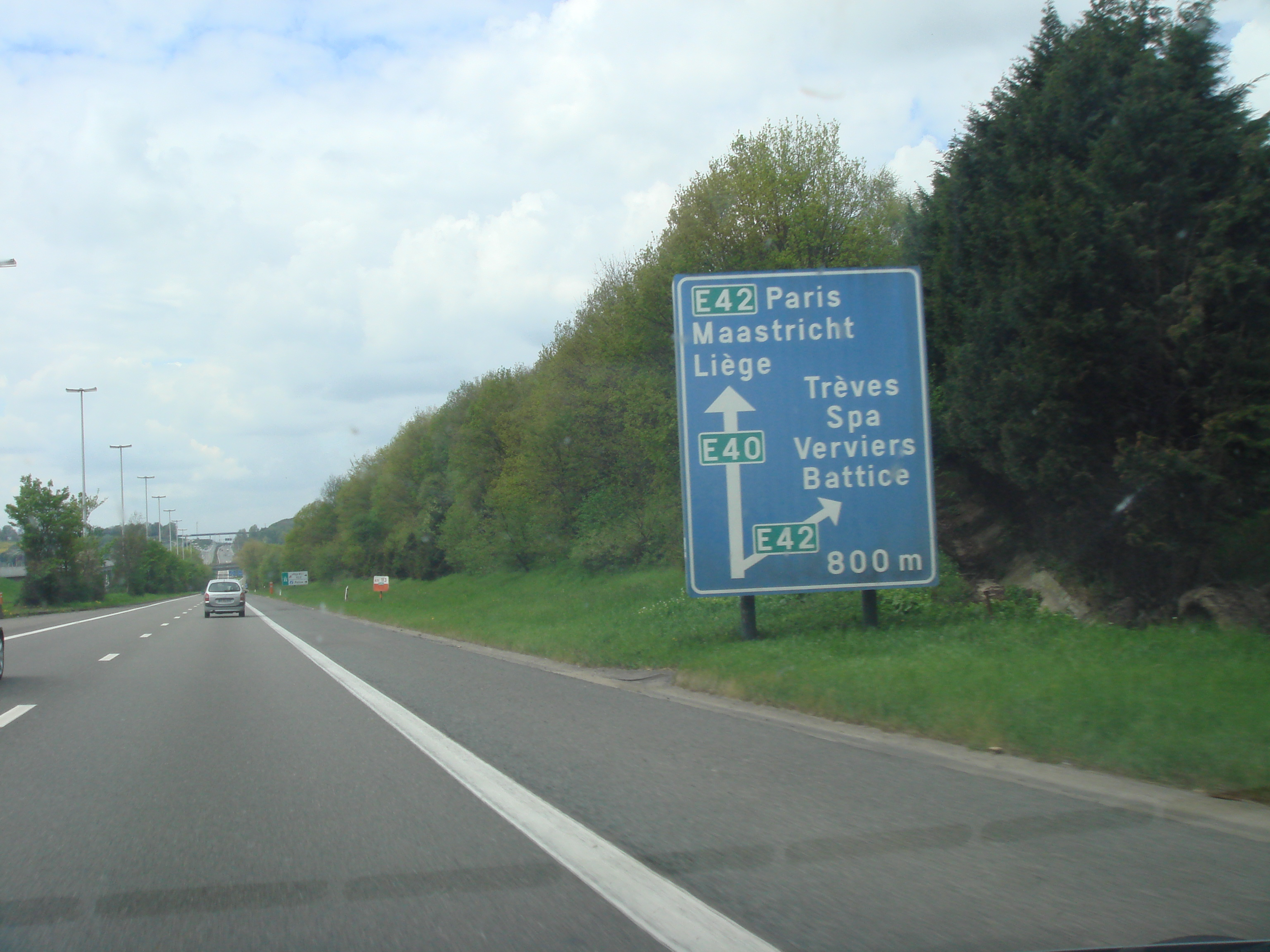
The A3 near the intersection with the E42.

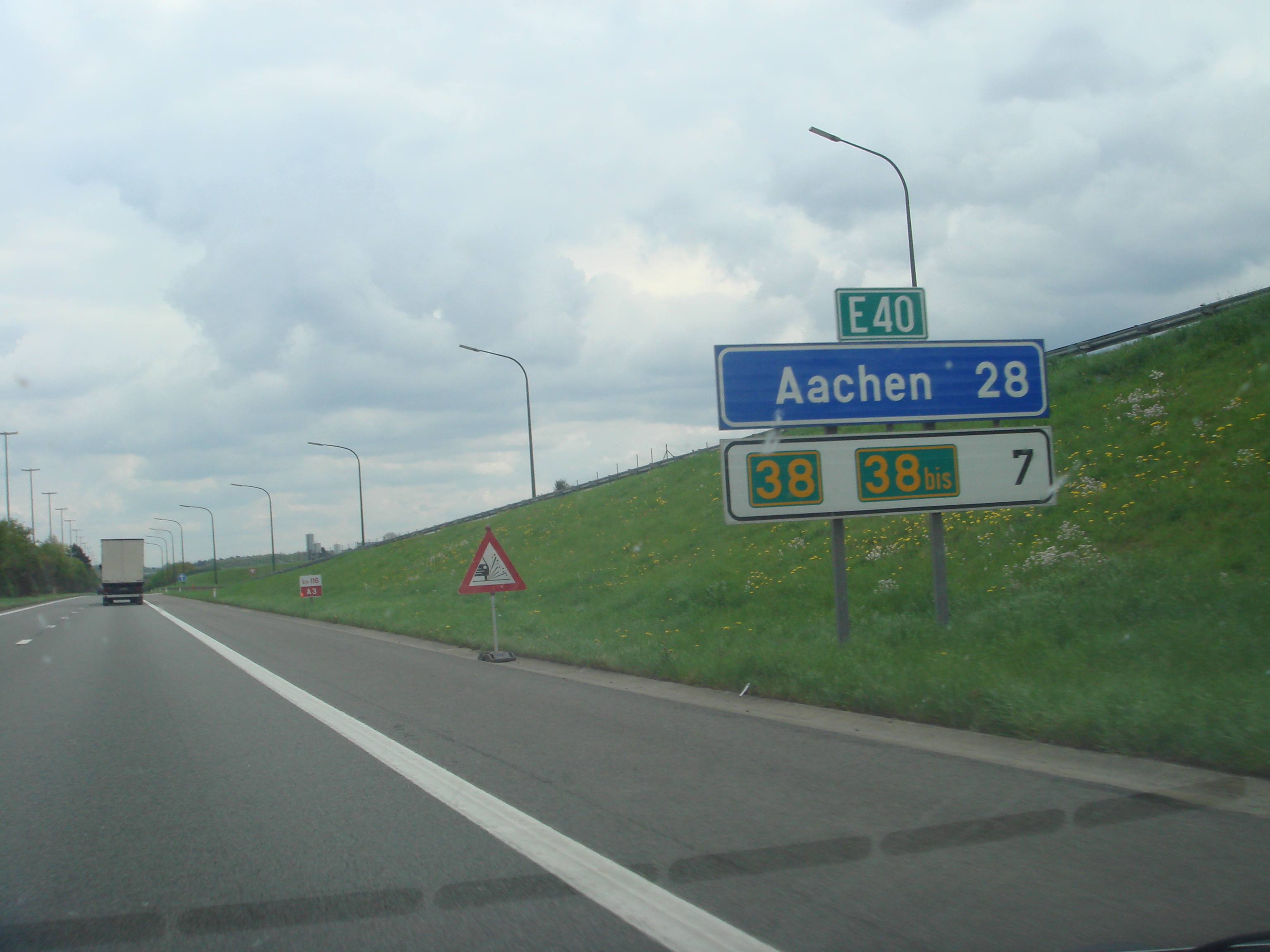
The A3 in the direction of Aachen, Germany.

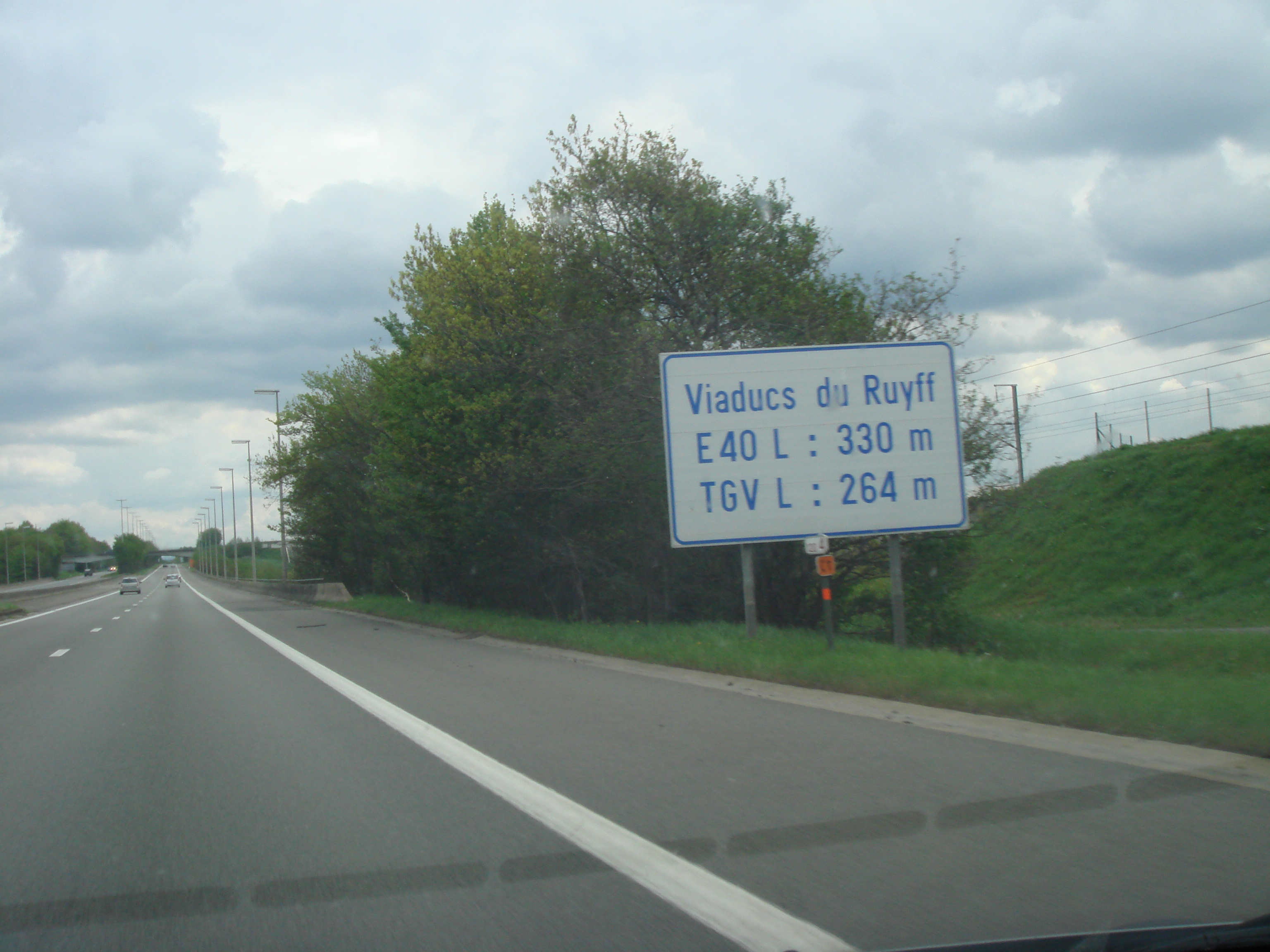
The A3 at the level of the Viaduct of Ruyff.
