= Lubbeek =

- Municipality
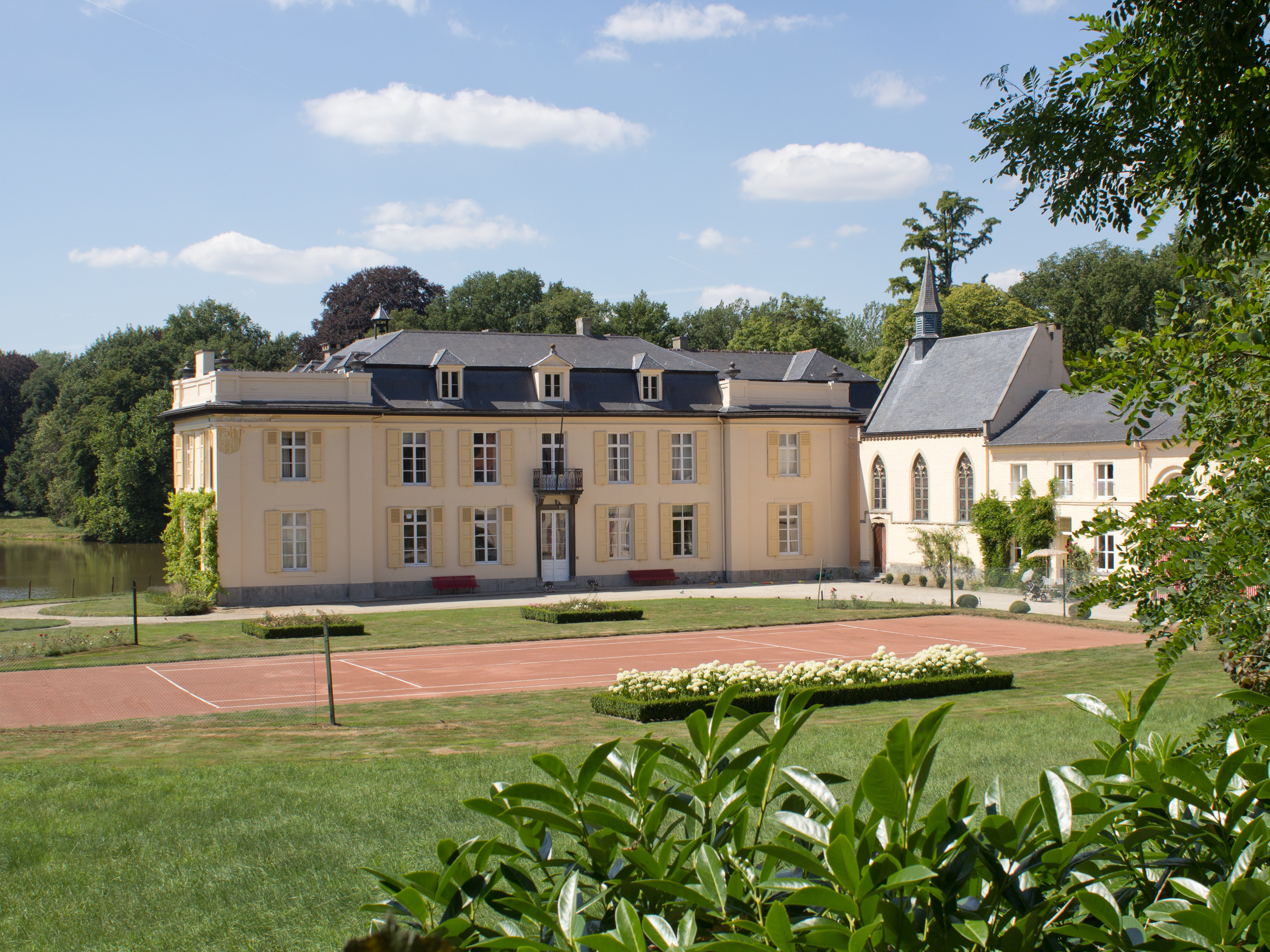

- Flag Coat of arms

- Location of Lubbeek in Flemish Brabant
- Interactive map of Lubbeek
- Location in Belgium
- Coordinates: 50°52′54″N 04°50′29″E
- Country: Belgium
- Community: Flemish Community
- Region: Flemish Region
- Province: Flemish Brabant
- Arrondissement: Leuven

Government
  - Mayor: Theo Francken (N-VA)
  - Governing parties: N-VA, CD&V

Area
  - Total: 45.28 km^{2} (17.48 sq mi)

Population (2018-01-01)
  - Total: 14,393
  - Density: 317.9/km^{2} (823.3/sq mi)
- Postal codes: 3210-3212
- NIS code: 24066
- Area codes: 016
- Website: www.lubbeek.be

Lubbeek (Dutch pronunciation: [ˈlʏbeːk]) is a municipality located in the Belgian province of Flemish Brabant. The municipality comprises the towns of Binkom, Linden, Lubbeek proper and Pellenberg. On January 1, 2006, Lubbeek had a total population of 13,660. The total area is 46.13 km² which gives a population density of 296 inhabitants per km². Population has increased to 14,728 inhabitants by January 1, 2021. It is a part of the police zone Bierbeek-Boutersem-Holsbeek-Lubbeek. The inventory of Flemish heritage sites lists a number of sites as heritage sites in Lubbeek including a number of former windmills, churches, mansions and homes.

== Notable people ==
- Bo Brasseur (born 1998), long jumper
