= Arrondissement of Leuven =

Arrondissement in Flanders, Belgium

Administrative Arrondissement of Leuven Arrondissement Leuven
- Administrative Arrondissement
- Location of the arrondissement in Flemish Brabant
- Coordinates: 50.9°N 4.8°E
- Country: Belgium
- Region: Flanders
- Province: Flemish Brabant
- Municipalities: 30

Area
  - Total: 1,168.83 km^{2} (451.29 sq mi)

Population (1 January 2017)
  - Total: 502,602
  - Density: 430.004/km^{2} (1,113.71/sq mi)
- Time zone: UTC+1 (CET)
  - Summer (DST): UTC+2 (CEST)

The Leuven Arrondissement (Dutch: Arrondissement Leuven; French: Arrondissement de Louvain) is one of two arrondissements in the Belgian province of Flemish Brabant. It lies east of the Brussels-Capital Region. The arrondissement has an area of 1,168.83 km^{2} (451.29 sq mi) and has (as of January 1, 2017) 502,602 inhabitants.

== Municipalities ==
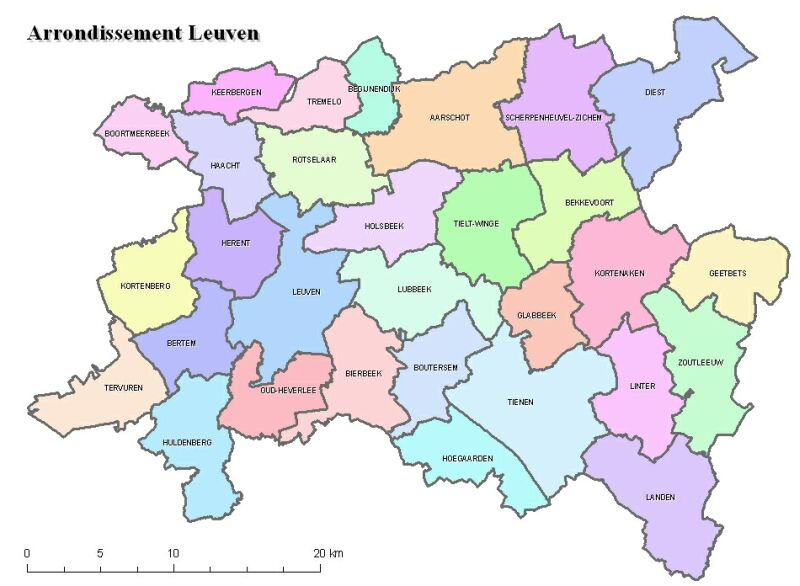
The arrondissement of Leuven

The arrondissement is made up of the following municipalities:

- Aarschot
- Begijnendijk
- Bekkevoort
- Bertem
- Bierbeek
- Boortmeerbeek
- Boutersem
- Diest
- Geetbets
- Glabbeek
- Haacht
- Herent
- Hoegaarden
- Holsbeek
- Huldenberg
- Keerbergen
- Kortenaken
- Kortenberg
- Landen
- Leuven
- Linter
- Lubbeek
- Oud-Heverlee
- Rotselaar
- Scherpenheuvel-Zichem
- Tervuren
- Tielt-Winge
- Tienen
- Tremelo
- Zoutleeuw

Formerly independent municipalities or deelgemeenten:

- Aarschot
- Assent
- Attenhoven
- Attenrode
- Averbode
- Baal
- Begijnendijk
- Bekkevoort
- Bertem
- Betekom
- Bierbeek
- Binkom
- Blanden
- Boortmeerbeek
- Bost
- Boutersem
- Budingen
- Bunsbeek
- Deurne
- Diest
- Dormaal
- Drieslinter
- Duisburg
- Eliksem
- Erps-Kwerps
- Everberg
- Ezemaal
- Geetbets
- Gelrode
- Glabbeek-Zuurbemde
- Goetsenhoven
- Grazen
- Haacht
- Haasrode
- Hakendover
- Halle-Booienhoven
- Helen-Bos
- Herent
- Hever
- Heverlee
- Hoegaarden
- Hoeleden
- Holsbeek
- Houwaart
- Huldenberg
- Kaggevinne
- Kapellen
- Keerbergen
- Kerkom
- Kersbeek-Miskom
- Kessel-Lo
- Korbeek-Dijle
- Korbeek-Lo
- Kortenaken
- Kortenberg
- Kortrijk-Dutsel
- Kumtich
- Laar
- Landen
- Langdorp
- Leefdaal
- Leuven
- Linden
- Loonbeek
- Lovenjoel
- Lubbeek
- Meensel-Kiezegem
- Meerbeek
- Meldert
- Melkwezer
- Messelbroek
- Molenbeek-Wersbeek
- Molenstede
- Neerhespen
- Neerijse
- Neerlanden
- Neerlinter
- Neervelp
- Neerwinden
- Nieuwrode
- Oorbeek
- Oplinter
- Opvelp
- Orsmaal-Gussenhoven
- Ottenburg
- Oud-Heverlee
- Outgaarden
- Overhespen
- Overwinden
- Pellenberg
- Ransberg
- Rillaar
- Roosbeek
- Rotselaar
- Rummen
- Rumsdorp
- Schaffen
- Scherpenheuvel
- Sint-Agatha-Rode
- Sint-Joris-Weert
- Sint-Joris-Winge
- Sint-Margriete-Houtem
- Sint-Pieters-Rode
- Testelt
- Tervuren
- Tielt
- Tienen
- Tildonk
- Tremelo
- Vaalbeek
- Veltem-Beisem
- Vertrijk
- Vissenaken
- Vossem
- Waanrode
- Waasmont
- Walsbets
- Walshoutem
- Wange
- Webbekom
- Werchter
- Wespelaar
- Wezemaal
- Wezeren
- Willebringen
- Wilsele
- Winksele
- Wommersom
- Zichem
- Zoutleeuw
