= N23 road (Belgium) =

Road in Belgium

The N23 is a short national highway in the Brussels Capital Region, Belgium. It is one of the busiest roads within the capital with daily gridlock during the rush hours.

The road consists originally of two separate sections that were once part of the European Route 5 (E5, now E40) through Brussels, separated by the small ring (N0/R20). It is the only highway in Belgium with two kilometer-zero points, one for the eastern branch and another for the western branch.

As with all national roads and motorways, ownership was transferred to the regional government in the 1990s. The N23 road remains unsigned as signage within Brussels never shows any road numbers.

== N23 East ==
The eastern branch has two separate roadways for each direction. The eastbound section begins at the Arts-Loi/Kunst-Wet intersection of the small ring and the N3 road, briefly following Boulevard du Regent/Regentlaan before travelling eastwards on Rue Belliard/Belliardstraat for about one kilometer. Just outside of the Leopold Park the N23 enters the Belliard tunnel and this leads the road to the so-called Reyers Complex, the junction of the Greater ring (R21) and the A3 motorway, which is the continuation of the N23. Combined length is 3.2 kilometers. The N3 eastbound joins the N23 eastbound from the beginning but branches off inside the Belliard tunnel.

The westbound section begins at the Reyers Complex, where the A3 motorway continues as the N23 into the Reyers-Centre tunnel. At the end of this tunnel, next to Place des Gueux/Geuzenplein, the road follows Avenue de Cortenbergh/Kortenberglaan towards Schuman roundabout in the European Quarter. Between this point and the Arts-Loi/Kunst-Wet intersection the N23 joins the N3 on Rue de la Loi/Wetstraat. Combined length is 2.9 kilometers.

Avenue de Roodebeek/Roodebeeklaan which is located on top of the Reyers-Centre tunnel has the designation N23a. The section of Rue Froissart/Froissartstraat between Rue Belliard/Belliardstraat (there N295) and the Schuman roundabout is designated N23b. This forms an alternative for the Belliard tunnel above ground.

== N23 West ==
The western branch, which is usually included within the R20 designation, was known until the 1960s as the N10 bis, together with the motorway Brussels-Ostend (A10). The route begins at the eastern entrance of the Leopold II tunnel, close to Place de l'Yser/IJzerplein. Continuing through Belgium's longest road tunnel, the N23 returns to surface right next to the National Basilica and heads further west on Avenue Charles Quint/Keizer Karellaan. The road ends exactly on the border with the Flemish Region, where it connects to the N9 road and continues as the A10 motorway, not far from the Grand-Bigard/Groot-Bijgaarden interchange with the R0 Outer ring road. Combined length for the western branch is 4.5 kilometers, bringing the total for the N23 road to about 7.5 kilometers, making it the shortest national road in Belgium after the N24 road.

== Sources ==
- Groot Brussel/Le Grand Bruxelles Jumbo Atlas, 18th edition, De Rouck Geocart NV.
- Bruxelles/Brussel patent-folded, several editions, Falkplan-Suurland BV.
- Carte Routière de Belgique: Province de Brabant, 3rd edition, R. De Rouck.
