= Keerbergen =

- Municipality
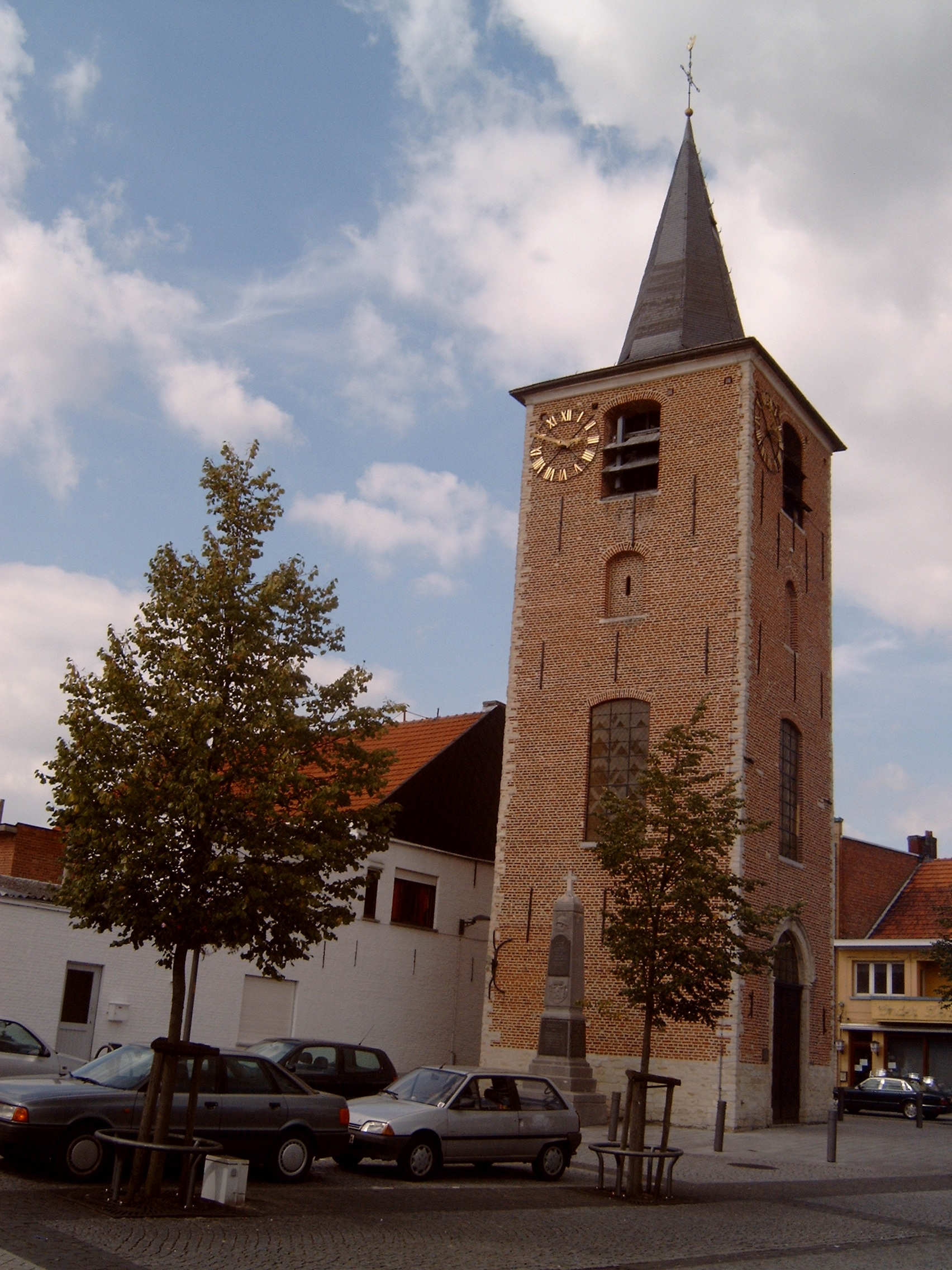
- Sint Michiels church

- Flag Coat of arms

- Location of Keerbergen in Flemish Brabant
- Interactive map of Keerbergen
- Location in Belgium
- Coordinates: 51°00′N 04°37′E
- Country: Belgium
- Community: Flemish Community
- Region: Flemish Region
- Province: Flemish Brabant
- Arrondissement: Leuven

Government
  - Mayor: Ann Schevenels (OpenVLD)
  - Governing parties: OpenVld, CD&V

Area
  - Total: 18.54 km^{2} (7.16 sq mi)

Population (2018-01-01)
  - Total: 12,743
  - Density: 687.3/km^{2} (1,780/sq mi)
- Postal codes: 3140
- NIS code: 24048
- Area codes: 015, 016
- Website: www.keerbergen.be

Keerbergen (Dutch pronunciation: [ˈkeːrbɛrɣə(n)]) is a municipality located in the Belgian province of Flemish Brabant. The municipality comprises only the town of Keerbergen proper. On January 1, 2006, Keerbergen had a total population of 12,444. The total area is 18.39 km² which gives a population density of 677 inhabitants per km².

== History ==
The oldest reference to Keerbergen appeared the eleventh century as Chierberghe, which was donated in 1036 by the lord of Incourt to the bishop of Liège.
