= Tremelo =

- Municipality
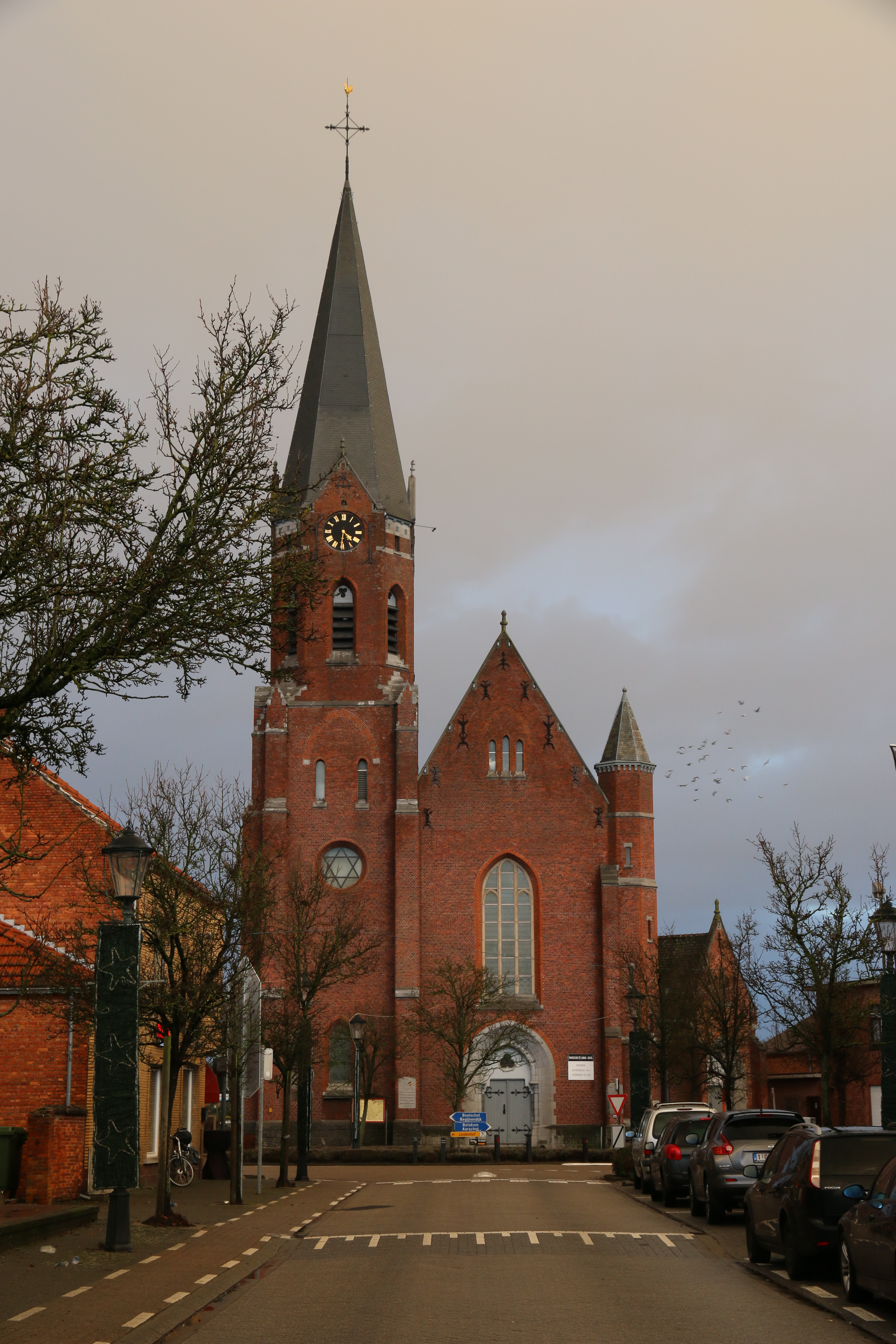

- Flag Coat of arms

- Location of Tremelo in Flemish Brabant
- Interactive map of Tremelo
- Location in Belgium
- Coordinates: 50°59′N 04°42′E
- Country: Belgium
- Community: Flemish Community
- Region: Flemish Region
- Province: Flemish Brabant
- Arrondissement: Leuven

Government
  - Mayor: Bert de Wit (CD&V)
  - Governing parties: CD&V, Groen, N-VA

Area
  - Total: 21.89 km^{2} (8.45 sq mi)

Population (2018-01-01)
  - Total: 14,842
  - Density: 678.0/km^{2} (1,756/sq mi)
- Postal codes: 3120, 3128
- NIS code: 24109
- Area codes: 016, 015
- Website: www.tremelo.be

Tremelo (Dutch pronunciation: [ˈtreːməloː]) is a municipality located in the Belgian province of Flemish Brabant, in Flanders. The municipality comprises the towns of Baal and Tremelo proper. On January 1, 2006, Tremelo had a total population of 13,725. The total area is 21.57 km^{2} (5330 acres) which gives a population density of 636 inhabitants per km^{2} (1647 per sq. mi.).

Located in the arrondissement or administrative district of Leuven, the official language is Dutch. Tremelo is most famous for having been the hometown of Father Damien, SS.CC. whom Pope Benedict XVI canonized on October 11, 2009, as Saint Damien of Molokai. Father Damien is locally known as Pater Damiaan, and was a legendary martyr of charity who had tended to the lepers in the Hawaiian Islands.

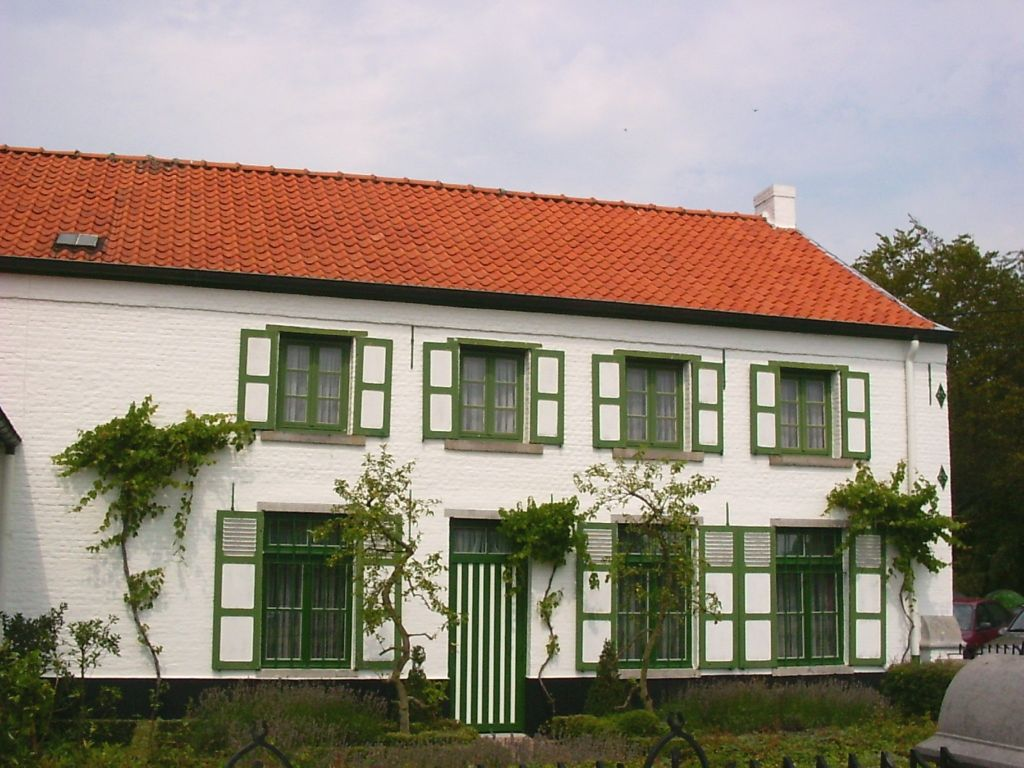
Birthplace of Father Damien
