= Oud-Heverlee =

- Municipality
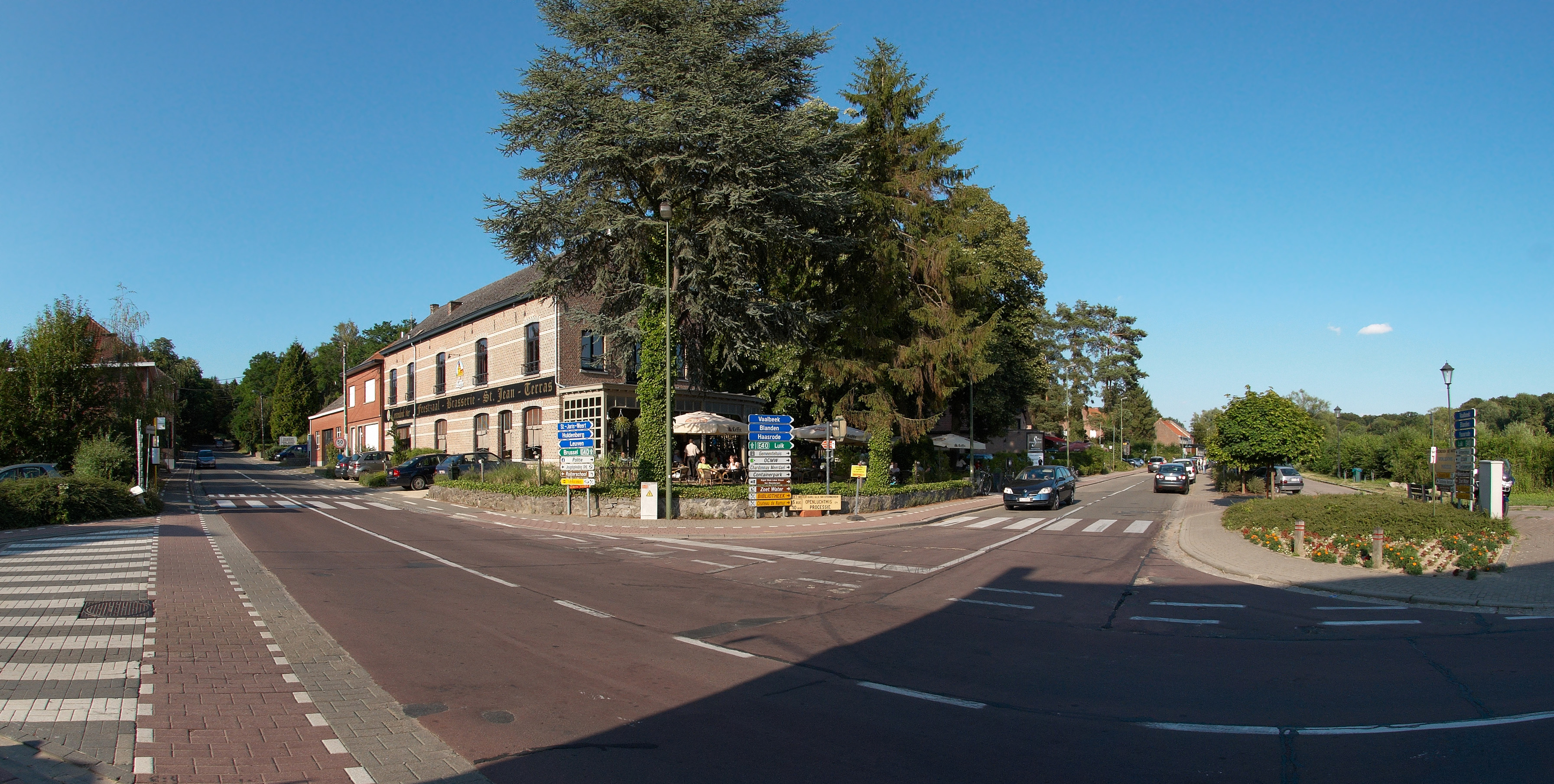

- Flag Coat of arms

- Location of Oud-Heverlee in Flemish Brabant
- Interactive map of Oud-Heverlee
- Location in Belgium
- Coordinates: 50°50′N 04°40′E
- Country: Belgium
- Community: Flemish Community
- Region: Flemish Region
- Province: Flemish Brabant
- Arrondissement: Leuven

Government
  - Mayor: Bart Clerckx (CD&V)
  - Governing parties: CD&V, Groen, Vooruit-plus

Area
  - Total: 31.18 km^{2} (12.04 sq mi)

Population (2018-01-01)
  - Total: 11,099
  - Density: 356.0/km^{2} (921.9/sq mi)
- Postal codes: 3050-3054
- NIS code: 24086
- Area codes: 016
- Website: www.oud-heverlee.be

Oud-Heverlee (Dutch pronunciation: [ˌʌutˈɦeːvərleː]) is a municipality located in the Belgian province of Flemish Brabant. The municipality comprises the villages of Blanden, Haasrode, Oud-Heverlee proper, Sint-Joris-Weert and Vaalbeek. On January 1, 2018, Oud-Heverlee had a total population of 11,099. The total area is 31.14 km^{2} which gives a population density of 356 inhabitants per km^{2}.

== Football team ==
The football team of Oud-Heverlee (Oud-Heverlee Leuven) plays in the first division in Belgium since the 2011–12 season. They won the second division title in 2011. They have their training ground here.

== See also ==
- Haasrode Research-Park
