= Holsbeek =

- Municipality
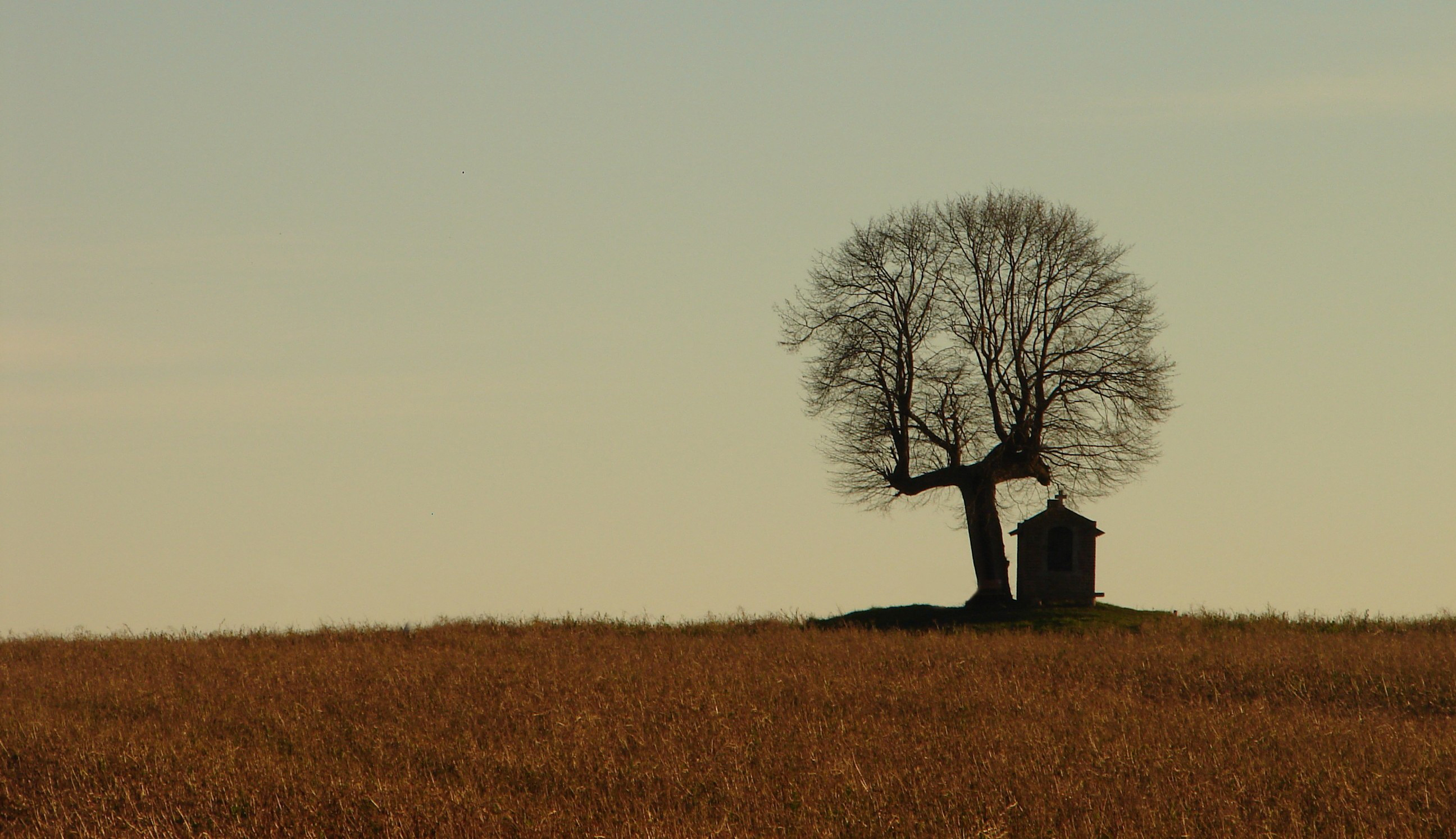
- The chapel of Saint Joseph, near Sint-Pieters-Rode, Holsbeek

- Flag Coat of arms

- Location of Holsbeek in Flemish Brabant
- Interactive map of Holsbeek
- Location in Belgium
- Coordinates: 50°55′N 04°46′E
- Country: Belgium
- Community: Flemish Community
- Region: Flemish Region
- Province: Flemish Brabant
- Arrondissement: Leuven

Government
  - Mayor: Bram Van Baelen (CD&V)
  - Governing parties: CD&V, OpenVld, Groen

Area
  - Total: 38.78 km^{2} (14.97 sq mi)

Population (2018-01-01)
  - Total: 9,905
  - Density: 255.4/km^{2} (661.5/sq mi)
- Postal codes: 3220, 3221
- NIS code: 24043
- Area codes: 016
- Website: www.holsbeek.be

Holsbeek (Dutch pronunciation: [ˈɦɔlzbeːk]) is a municipality located in the Belgian province of Flemish Brabant. The municipality comprises the towns of Holsbeek proper, Kortrijk-Dutsel, Nieuwrode and Sint-Pieters-Rode. On January 1, 2006, Holsbeek had a total population of 9,205. The total area is 38.50 km^{2} which gives a population density of 239 inhabitants per km^{2}.

A notable landmark in Holsbeek is the medieval castle of Horst, which is the fictional home of de rode ridder (the red knight).
