= Flemish Brabant =

Province of Belgium

Flemish Brabant Vlaams-Brabant
- Province
- Flag Coat of arms Brandmark

- Interactive map of Flemish Brabant
- Coordinates: 50°55′N 04°35′E
- Country: Belgium
- Region: Flanders
- Capital (and largest city): Leuven

Government
  - Governor: Jan Spooren

Area
  - Total: 2,118 km^{2} (818 sq mi)

Population (1 January 2024)
  - Total: 1,196,773
  - Density: 565.0/km^{2} (1,463/sq mi)

GDP
  - Total: €68.662 billion (2024)
  - Per capita: €56,981 (2024)
- ISO 3166 code: BE-VBR
- HDI (2021): 0.949 very high · 4th of 11
- Website: vlaamsbrabant.be

Flemish Brabant (Dutch: Vlaams-Brabant [ˌvlaːmz ˈbraːbɑnt]; (Note: Vlaams in isolation is pronounced [vlaːms].) French: Brabant flamand [bʁabɑ̃ flamɑ̃]) is a province of Flanders, one of the three regions of Belgium. It borders on (clockwise from the North) the Belgian provinces of Antwerp, Limburg, Liège, Walloon Brabant, Hainaut and East Flanders. Flemish Brabant also surrounds the Brussels-Capital Region. Its capital is Leuven. It has an area of 2,118 km^{2} (818 sq mi) which is divided into two administrative districts (arrondissementen in Dutch) containing 65 municipalities. As of January 2024, Flemish Brabant had a population of over 1.19 million.

Flemish Brabant was created in 1995 by the splitting of the former province of Brabant into three parts: two new provinces, Flemish Brabant and Walloon Brabant; and the Brussels-Capital Region, which no longer belongs to any province. The split was made to accommodate the eventual division of Belgium in three regions (Flanders, Wallonia and the Brussels-Capital Region).

The province is made up of two arrondissements. The Halle-Vilvoorde Arrondissement surrounds Brussels and is mainly a residential area, though it also contains large industrial zones and has Belgium's main airport. It is joined by the Leuven Arrondissement, centered on Leuven, the province's capital and largest city. Products of Flemish Brabant include Belgian beers.

The official language of Flemish Brabant is Dutch, as in the rest of Flanders. A few municipalities are to a certain extent allowed to use French to communicate with their citizens; these are called the municipalities with language facilities. Other such special municipalities can be found along the border between Flanders and Wallonia, and between the French and the German Community of Belgium. Halle-Vilvoorde mostly surrounds Brussels, which is officially bilingual but whose inhabitants mostly speak French.

== Politics ==
The Governor is the representative or "commissioner" of the federal and Flemish governments in Flemish Brabant. He is appointed by the Flemish government, on the unanimous advice of the Federal Council of Ministers. From the creation of Flemish Brabant in 1995, as a result of the division of the Province of Brabant into Flemish- and French-speaking provinces, until his retirement in 2020, the governor was Lodewijk De Witte. He was succeeded by Jan Spooren.

The governor is responsible for supervising the local authorities, ensuring that laws and decrees are observed, maintaining public order and security, and coordinating the response to a disaster which has occurred in his province. He also presides over the Deputation, however, he does not have the right to vote in the Deputation except in those cases where the Deputation exercises a judicial function.

Flemish Brabant is the only province that has a deputy governor as well. The deputy governor is appointed by the Flemish Government on the unanimous advice of the Federal Council of Ministers and must have a considerable knowledge of both the Dutch and the French language. He is responsible for ensuring that the language legislation is observed in the peripheral municipalities of Flemish Brabant.

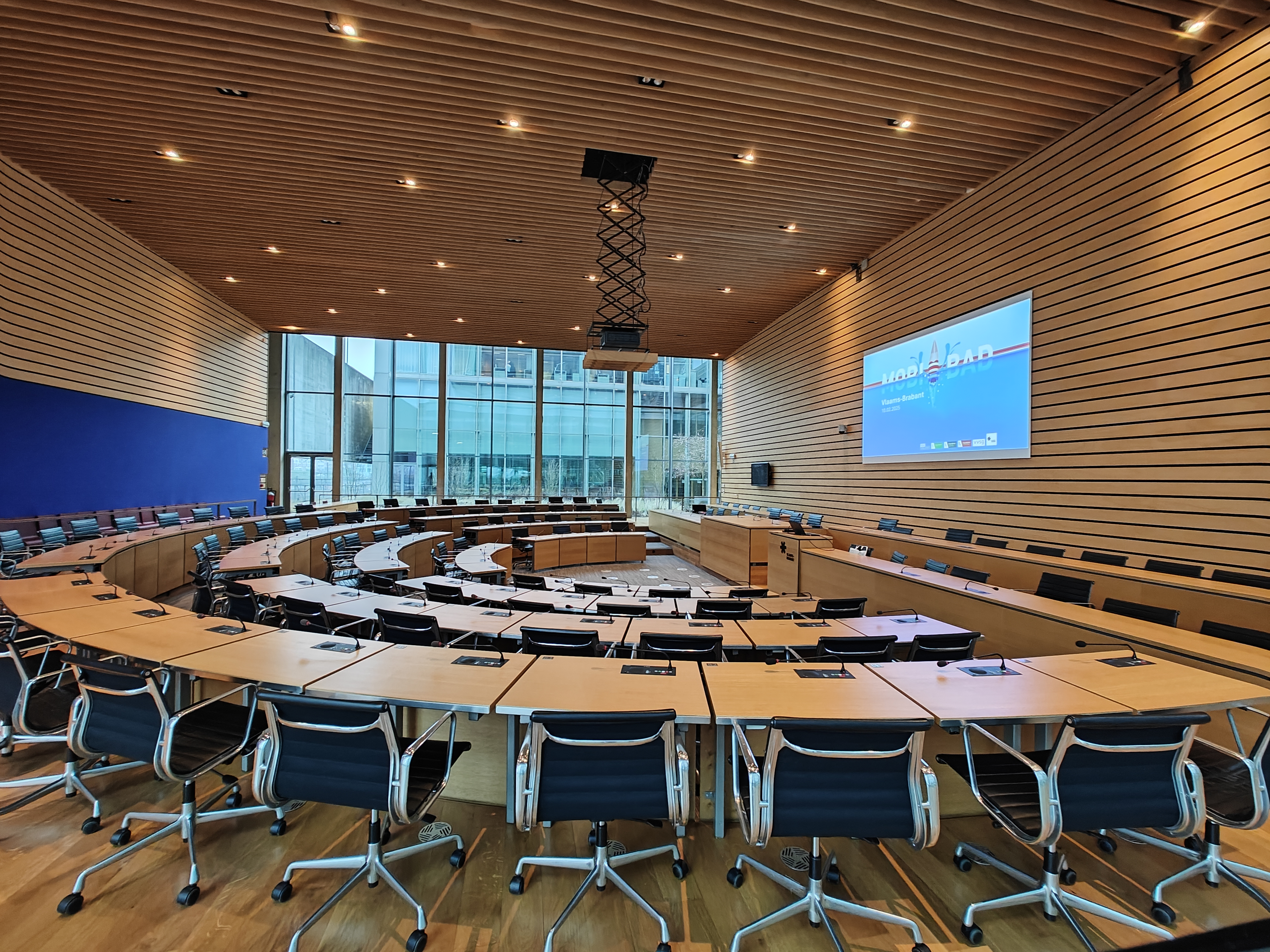
Provincial Council meeting room

The Provincial Council of Flemish Brabant consists of 72 members (84 members until 2012) elected for a term of office of 6 years. The last election was held on Sunday 14 October 2012. Seven political parties have seats in the provincial council:

- New Flemish Alliance (N-VA): 19 seats
- Christen-Democratisch en Vlaams (CD&V): 15 seats
- Open Flemish Liberals and Democrats (Open Vld): 13 seats
- Vooruit: 8 seats
- Green (Groen): 7 seats
- Union of Francophones (UF): 5 seats
- Flemish Interest (Vlaams Belang): 5 seats

The current president of the provincial council is An Hermans (CD&V). She is assisted by a bureau which consists of two vice-presidents, four secretaries, three quaestors and the floor leaders of the fractions in the provincial council.

The governing majority in the provincial council for 2013–2018 is formed by CD&V, Open VLD, sp.a and Groen. These parties together have a majority of 43 out of 72 seats.

The Deputation is the executive organ responsible for the daily administration of the province. It consists of the governor and six deputies elected by the provincial council from among its midst. For the 2013–2018 legislative term, the deputies are divided among the majority parties as follows: two for CD&V, two for Open Vld, one for sp.a and one for Groen.

== Economy ==
The Gross domestic product (GDP) of the province was 49.8 billion € in 2018. GDP per capita adjusted for purchasing power was 38,600 € or 128% of the EU27 average in the same year.

== Religion ==
According to the International Social Survey Programme 2008: Religion III by the Association of Religion Data Archives, 73.9% of Flemish Brabant's population identified themselves as Catholics, 23.1% as non-religious, and 3% adhered to other religions.

Religion in Flemish Brabant (2008)
1. Roman Catholicism (73.9%)
2. Protestantism (1.10%)
3. Non-religious (23.1%)
4. Other religion (1.90%)

== Municipalities ==
Flemish Brabant has 63 municipalities: 33 in the Arrondissement of Halle-Vilvoorde and 30 in Leuven.

Map showing the location of the Arrondissement of Halle-Vilvoorde

Halle-Vilvoorde arrondissement:
- Affligem
- Asse
- Beersel
- Bever
- Dilbeek
- Drogenbos
- Grimbergen
- Halle
- Hoeilaart
- Kampenhout
- Kapelle-op-den-Bos
- Kraainem
- Lennik
- Liedekerke
- Linkebeek
- Londerzeel
- Machelen
- Meise
- Merchtem
- Opwijk
- Overijse
- Pajottegem
- Pepingen
- Roosdaal
- Sint-Genesius-Rode
- Sint-Pieters-Leeuw
- Steenokkerzeel
- Ternat
- Vilvoorde
- Wemmel
- Wezembeek-Oppem
- Zaventem
- Zemst
Leuven arrondissement:
- Aarschot
- Begijnendijk
- Bekkevoort
- Bertem
- Bierbeek
- Boortmeerbeek
- Boutersem
- Diest
- Geetbets
- Glabbeek
- Haacht
- Herent
- Hoegaarden
- Holsbeek
- Huldenberg
- Keerbergen
- Kortenaken
- Kortenberg
- Landen
- Leuven
- Linter
- Lubbeek
- Oud-Heverlee
- Rotselaar
- Scherpenheuvel-Zichem
- Tervuren
- Tielt-Winge
- Tienen
- Tremelo
- Zoutleeuw

== See also ==
- Duchy of Brabant
- Duke of Brabant
