= Kortenaken =

- Municipality
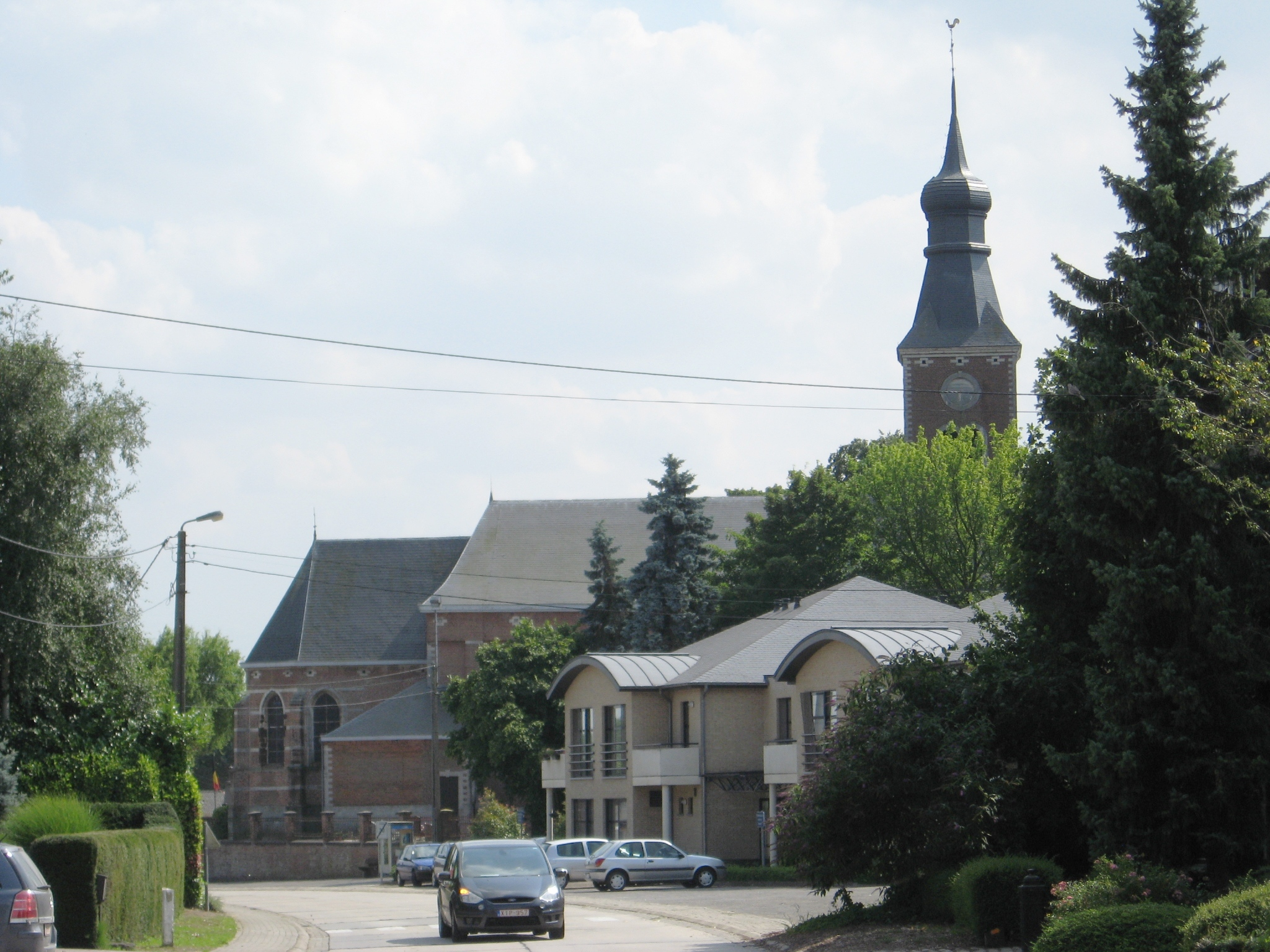

- Flag Coat of arms

- Location of Kortenaken in Flemish Brabant
- Interactive map of Kortenaken
- Location in Belgium
- Coordinates: 50°54′N 05°04′E
- Country: Belgium
- Community: Flemish Community
- Region: Flemish Region
- Province: Flemish Brabant
- Arrondissement: Leuven

Government
  - Mayor: Kristof Mollu (CD&V)
  - Governing parties: CD&V, N-VA, Vooruit

Area
  - Total: 49.44 km^{2} (19.09 sq mi)

Population (2018-01-01)
  - Total: 7,875
  - Density: 159.3/km^{2} (412.5/sq mi)
- Postal codes: 3470-3473-3472
- NIS code: 24054
- Area codes: 016, 011, 013
- Website: www.kortenaken.be

Kortenaken (Dutch pronunciation: [ˈkɔrtənaːkə(n)]) is a municipality located in the Belgian province of Flemish Brabant. The municipality comprises the towns of Hoeleden, Kersbeek-Miskom, Kortenaken proper, Ransberg and Waanrode. On January 1, 2014, Kortenaken had a total population of 7,881. The total area is 49.06 km² which gives a population density of 160,63 inhabitants per km².

Every year in August there used to be a three-day festival in Kortenaken, named Boerenrock, with electro music on Friday, rock music and a party on Saturday, and on Sunday music aimed at children and their parents. The final edition of this festival took place in 2016.
