= Bertem =

- Municipality
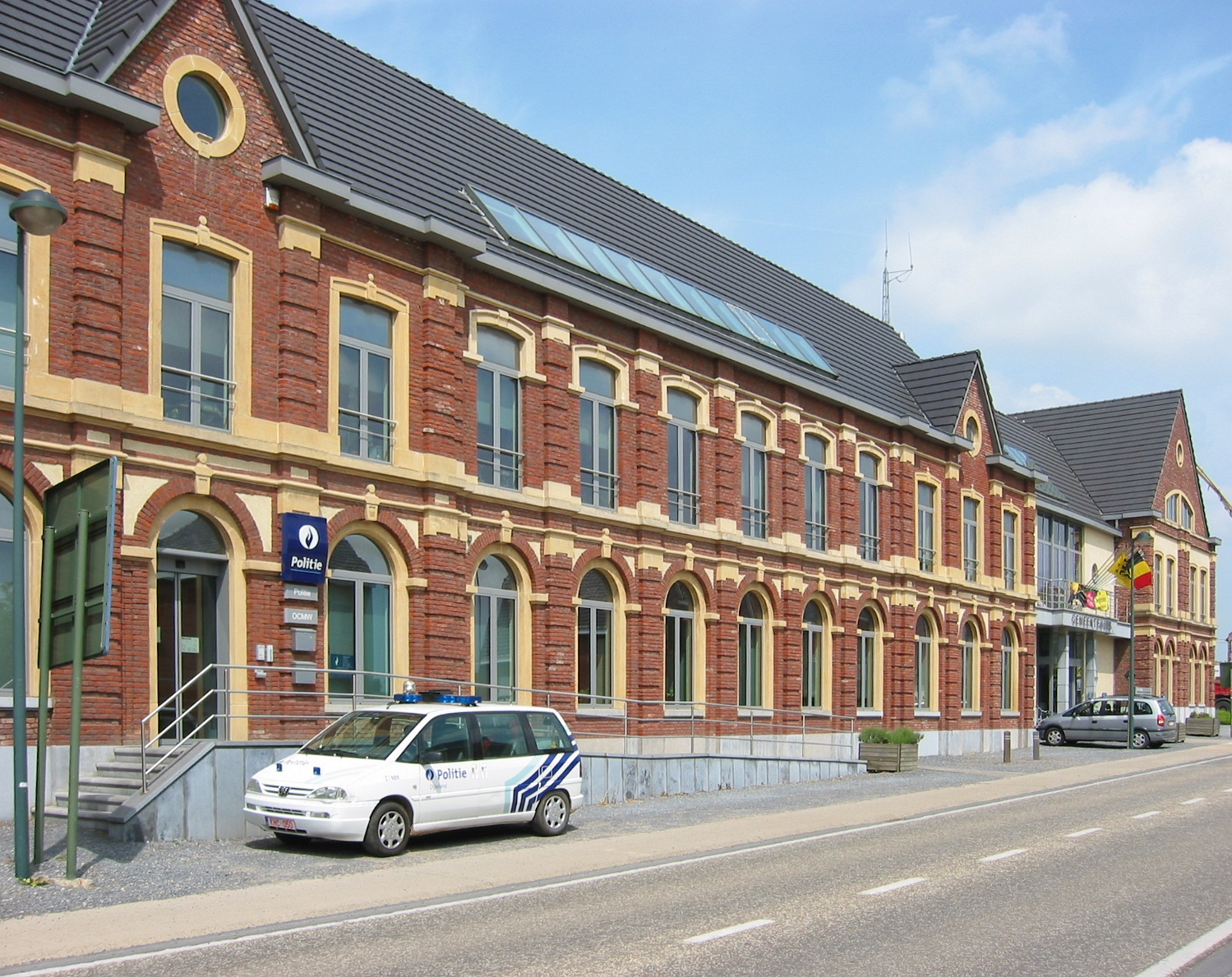
- Bertem town hall

- Flag Coat of arms

- Location of Bertem in Flemish Brabant
- Interactive map of Bertem
- Location in Belgium
- Coordinates: 50°51′N 04°37′E
- Country: Belgium
- Community: Flemish Community
- Region: Flemish Region
- Province: Flemish Brabant
- Arrondissement: Leuven

Government
  - Mayor: Joël Vander Elst (OpenVld)
  - Governing parties: OpenVld, CD&V

Area
  - Total: 29.99 km^{2} (11.58 sq mi)

Population (2018-01-01)
  - Total: 9,958
  - Density: 332.0/km^{2} (860.0/sq mi)
- Postal codes: 3060, 3061
- NIS code: 24009
- Area codes: 016 - 02
- Website: www.bertem.be

Bertem (Dutch pronunciation: [ˈbɛrtɛm]) is a municipality located in the Belgian province of Flemish Brabant. The municipality comprises the towns of Bertem proper, Korbeek-Dijle and Leefdaal. On January 1, 2006, Bertem had a total population of 9,215. The total area is 29.75 km^{2} which gives a population density of 310 inhabitants per km^{2}.

The area is noted for its rural landscape, in particular the "Koeheide" and "Bertembos" ("Bertem Forest"). On the open plains of Leefdaal, it is possible to see the endangered European Hamster (Cricetus cricetus)). The village of Bertem itself is home to the Sint-Pieters-Bandenkerk, a Romanesque church built between 950 and 1050.

Known cyclist Vlad van Mechelen is from there.

== See also ==
- List of municipalities of the Flemish Region
