= Glain =

Glain Glin-dlé-Lidje (Walloon)
- Sub-municipality of Liège
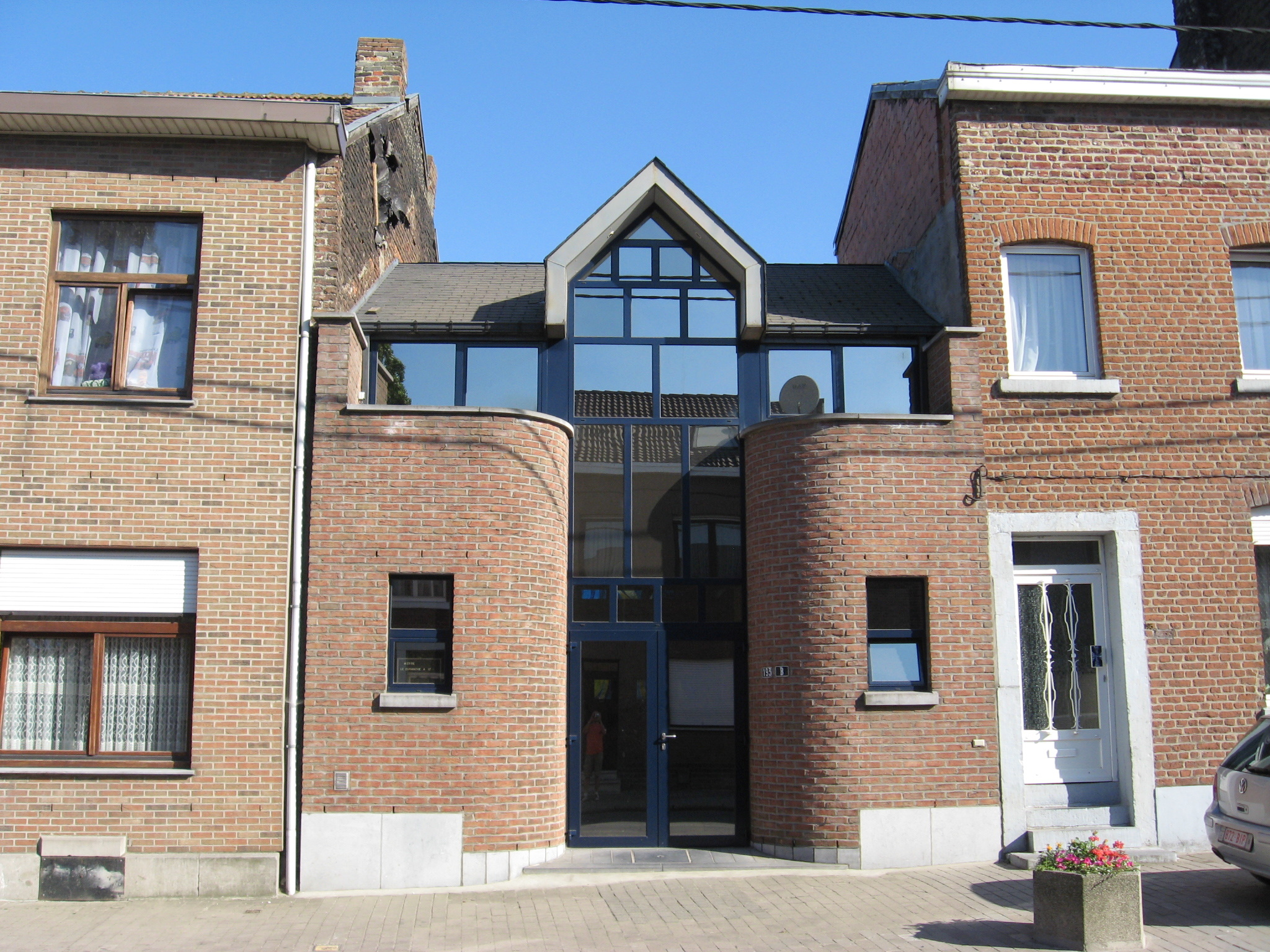
- Notre-Dame des Lumières Church

- Location in Liège
- Interactive map of Glain
- Location within Belgium Location within Liège Province
- Coordinates: 50°38′00″N 5°32′00″E
- Country: Belgium
- Community: French Community
- Region: Wallonia
- Province: Liège
- Arrondissement: Liège
- Municipality: Liège

Area
  - Total: 1.23 km^{2} (0.47 sq mi)

Population (2020-01-01)
  - Total: 3,069
  - Density: 2,500/km^{2} (6,460/sq mi)
- Postal codes: 4000
- Area codes: 04

Glain (French pronunciation: [ɡlɛ̃]; Walloon: Glin-dlé-Lidje) is a sub-municipality of the city of Liège located in the province of Liège, Wallonia, Belgium. The former municipality of Glain was formed on 31 December 1874, when it was detached from the municipality of Ans-et-Glain. On 1 January 1977, it was merged into Liège.
