= Linter, Belgium =

Linter
- Municipality
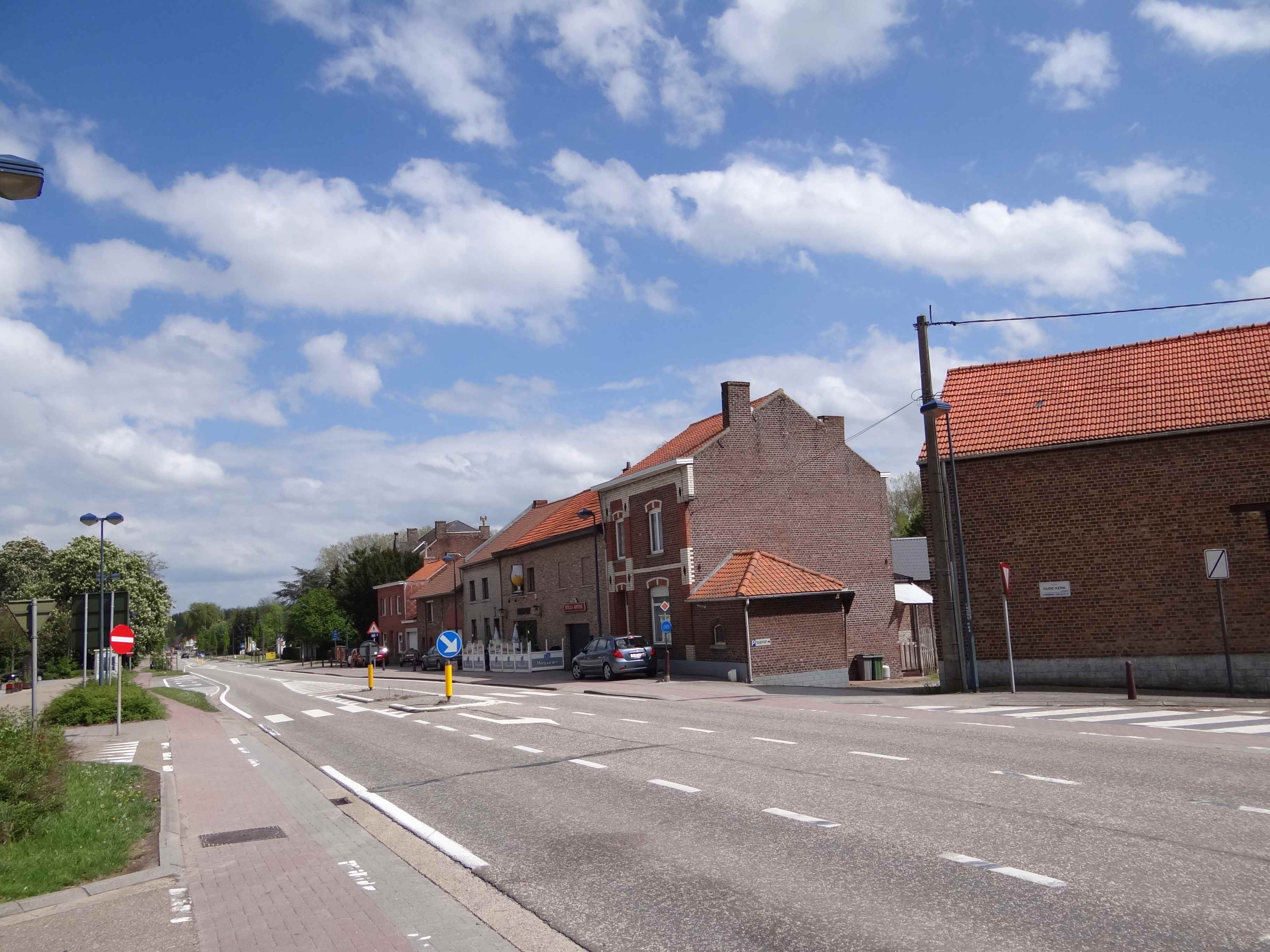

- Flag Coat of arms

- Location of Linter in Flemish Brabant
- Interactive map of Linter
- Location in Belgium
- Coordinates: 50°48′N 05°03′E
- Country: Belgium
- Community: Flemish Community
- Region: Flemish Region
- Province: Flemish Brabant
- Arrondissement: Leuven

Government
  - Mayor: Marc Wijnants (CD&V)
  - Governing party: CD&V

Area
  - Total: 36.87 km^{2} (14.24 sq mi)

Population (2018-01-01)
  - Total: 7,255
  - Density: 196.8/km^{2} (509.6/sq mi)
- Postal codes: 3350
- NIS code: 24133
- Area codes: 011, 016
- Website: www.linter.be

Linter (Dutch pronunciation: [ˈlɪntər]) is a municipality located in the Belgian province of Flemish Brabant. The municipality comprises the towns of Drieslinter, Melkwezer, Neerhespen (where the canine school of the Belgian police is situated), Neerlinter, Orsmaal-Gussenhoven, Overhespen and Wommersom. On January 1, 2006, Linter had a total population of 7,037. The total area is 36.38 km^{2} which gives a population density of 193 inhabitants per km^{2}.

The main economic activities of Linter are agricultural and commercial activities.

== Demographics ==
=== Languages ===
- Standard Dutch
- Getelands dialects, which are transitional Brabantian-Limburgish dialects.
