= Glabbeek =

- Municipality
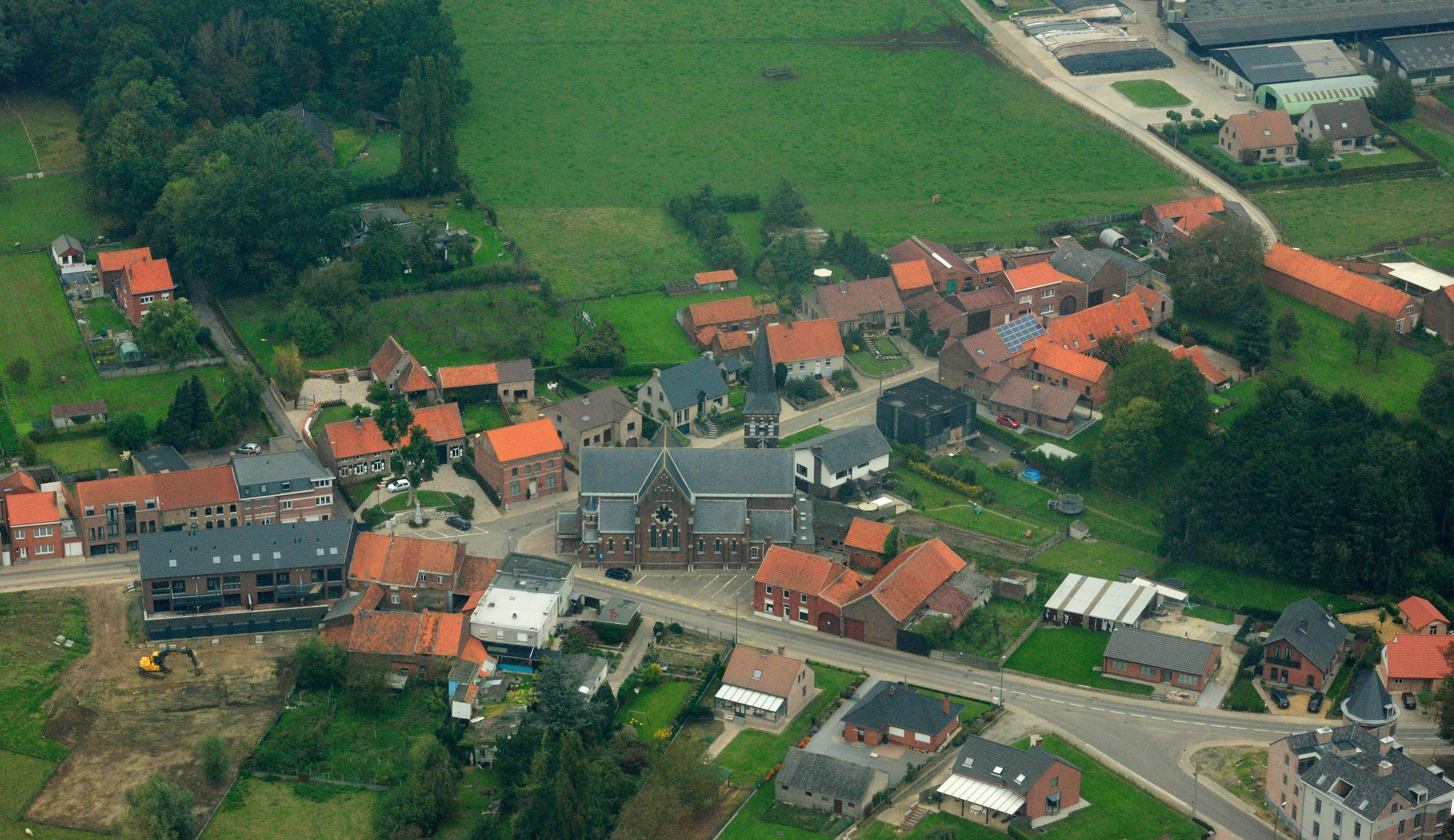

- Flag Coat of arms

- Location of Glabbeek in Flemish Brabant
- Interactive map of Glabbeek
- Location in Belgium
- Coordinates: 50°52′N 04°57′E
- Country: Belgium
- Community: Flemish Community
- Region: Flemish Region
- Province: Flemish Brabant
- Arrondissement: Leuven

Government
  - Mayor: Peter Reekmans (Dorpspartij)
  - Governing party: Dorpspartij

Area
  - Total: 26.99 km^{2} (10.42 sq mi)

Population (2018-01-01)
  - Total: 5,298
  - Density: 196.3/km^{2} (508.4/sq mi)
- Postal codes: 3380, 3381, 3384
- NIS code: 24137
- Area codes: 016
- Website: www.glabbeek.be

Glabbeek (Dutch pronunciation: [ˈɣlɑbeːk]) is a municipality located in the Belgian province of Flemish Brabant. The municipality comprises the populated places of Attenrode, Bunsbeek, Glabbeek proper, Kapellen, Wever and Zuurbemde. On January 1, 2006, Glabbeek had a total population of 5,189. The total area is 26.78 km^{2} which gives a population density of 194 inhabitants per km^{2}.
