= Zepperen =

- Village
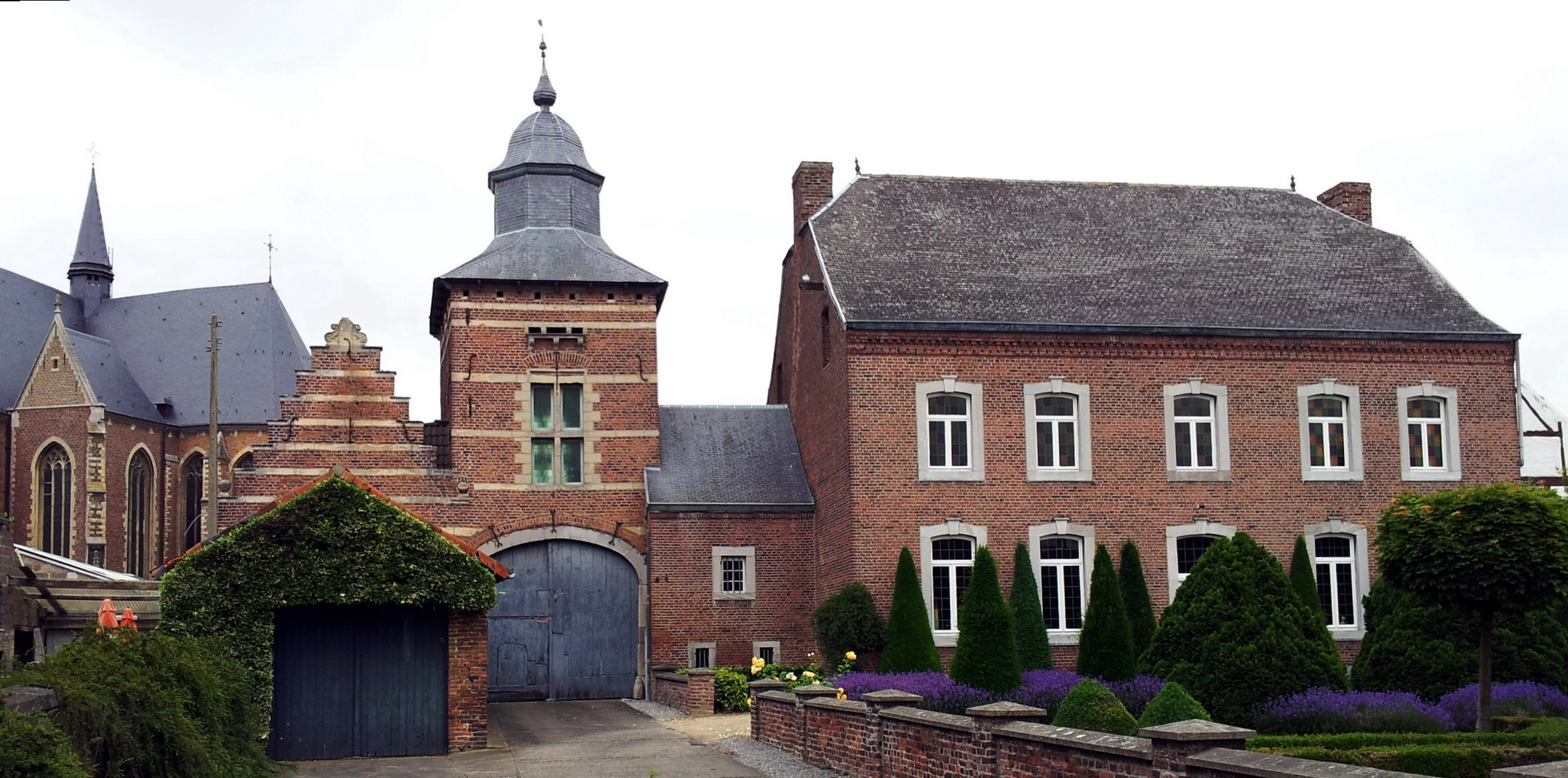
- View of Zepperen with the Saint-Genevieve church on the background

- Location in Belgium
- Coordinates: 50.821°N 5.247°E
- Country: Belgium
- Community: Flemish Community
- Province: Limburg
- Municipality: Sint-Truiden

Area
  - Total: 12.25 km^{2} (4.73 sq mi)

Population (2021)
  - Total: 3,515
  - Density: 286.9/km^{2} (743.2/sq mi)
- Time zone: CET

Zepperen is a village and a former municipality. It is part of the municipality of Sint-Truiden in the province of Limburg in Belgium.

This village developed in the northern, humid part of Haspengouw close to the stream Melsterbeek. This rivulet starts about 15 kilometers to the south near the border between Flanders and Wallonia and merges with the river Gete near Geetbets.

Traces of the prehistoric and Roman occupation were found alongside this river and alongside the Eigenbeek in the northern part of Zepperen.

The name of the village, in his Latin form ‘Septimburias’ or seven cabins, was first mentioned in the late 8th century. In the life of Saint Trudo, the founder of the nearby city of Sint-Truiden, is noted how the holy boy held a regularly nocturnal pilgrimage to Saint-Genevieve of Paris, especially worshipped in Zepperen. The young Trudo met in Zepperen around 650 with the interim-bishop Remaclus to ask him for his advice concerning his vocation. In that period there was already a basilica in Zepperen, dedicated to Saint-Genevieve.

Till the end of the 18th century the village was an enclave owned by the chapter of Saint-Servaas of Maastricht amidst the land of the principality of Liège. The popular pilgrimage to the so-called ‘Three holy sisters” stimulated this chapter to build a beautiful church in Zepperen. Only the defensive western tower of the Roman church from the 12th century still exists. During the whole of the 15th century a nave with transept was reconstructed towards this tower in the then modern late gothic style.

Zepperen has an elongated territory with the village square in the southwest corner. The communities of Roosbeek, Gippershoven, Tereyken and d’Eygen are situated more to the east and north. Ekhout or Dekken, in the middle of this territory, was mentioned in a document of 1244. This pasture between Eigenbeek and Bergbeek was used to graze the cattle of the villagers and to grow Canadian poplars by the village administration. In the late 19th century Dekken was transformed into farmland en since the 1950s the government allocated this terrain to build houses.

The proximity of the commercial and services center of Sint-Truiden makes Zepperen a living community for commuters. Zepperen merged with Sint-Truiden in 1977. The filling of the gaps between the existing houses gave the village its monotone face of ribbon building. The road from Sint-Truiden-Brustem to Wellen-Borgloon through the elevated Honsberg in the south of Zepperen is probably of mediaeval or Roman age. Since the 19th century Zepperen was enclosed in the northeastern part of Greater Sint-Truiden between the new highways to Tongeren (1817) and Hasselt (1839), and the railways to Hasselt (1847) and Tongeren (1879). New local roads were built around 1900 (the connection between the village square and the nearby train station of Ordingen) and in 1936 (the road from the center to the railway station of Kortenbos, one of the first roads in this region constructed in concrete). More recently the village is opened up in the north by the highway Sint-Truiden-Kortenbos and the connection highway Melveren-Ordingen in the west.

The Saint-Genevieve church is known for its wallpaintings in late gothic style (1509) and the altarpiece wings in the same style. Nearby the church is a churchyard gate (1765), the house of the curate (1907), the presbytery (1779), the house of the witchdoctor ’t Mesterke (1904) and the Ouwerx farmhouse (partly 1665). The famous Sint-Aloysius institute originated in the buildings of the former supreme convent of the Begards in the diocese of Liège, founded on the banks of the Melsterbeek in Zepperen in 1425. In the interval of the 19th and early 20th century these buildings were transformed in a castle for the noblemen of the families de Pitteurs, d’Astier and Loyaerts.

During the first world war a German Leib-Hussar was killed on 9 August 1914 and on the 17th a squadron of Belgian Guides was decimated by German Leib-Grenadiers. In the second World war there were two crashes in Zepperen: on the 30 July 1942 a German Junker 88-A4 was destroyed on landing, the three occupants died. On 27 April 1944 a Canadian Halifax MZ522 with the 431st crashed nearby the Sint-Aloysius institute. All the airmen got out safe by parachute. Two members of the resistance were shot dead near a crossroad “De Dikke Linde” by collaborationists of the German occupation force.

The village of Zepperen, known as a fruit growing area, was the starting place of the firm HMZ (Hayen Mommen Zepperen), which build windturbines from 1978 on.
