= Bierbeek =

- Municipality
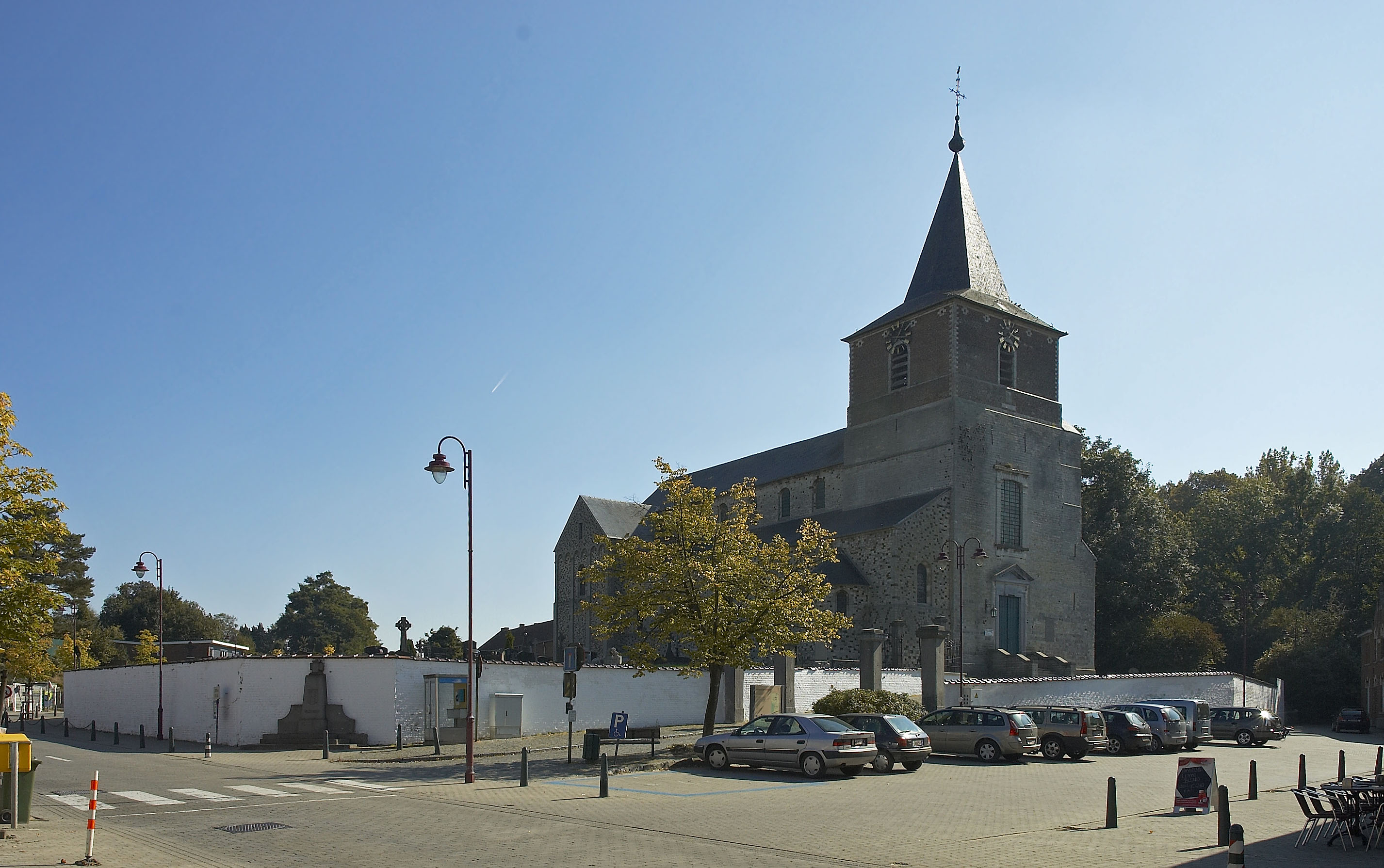

- Flag Coat of arms

- Location of Bierbeek in Flemish Brabant
- Interactive map of Bierbeek
- Location in Belgium
- Coordinates: 50°50′N 04°46′E
- Country: Belgium
- Community: Flemish Community
- Region: Flemish Region
- Province: Flemish Brabant
- Arrondissement: Leuven

Government
  - Mayor: Johan Vanhulst (CD&V)
  - Governing parties: CD&V, Vooruit, Groen

Area
  - Total: 38.97 km^{2} (15.05 sq mi)

Population (2018-01-01)
  - Total: 10,025
  - Density: 257.2/km^{2} (666.3/sq mi)
- Postal codes: 3360
- NIS code: 24011
- Area codes: 016
- Website: www.bierbeek.be

Bierbeek (Dutch pronunciation: [ˈbiːrbeːk]) is a municipality located in the Belgian province of Flemish Brabant. The municipality comprises the towns of Bierbeek proper, Korbeek-Lo, Lovenjoel and Opvelp. On January 1, 2006, Bierbeek had a total population of 9,147. The total area is 39.73 km^{2} which gives a population density of 230 inhabitants per km^{2}.

== Born ==
- Gaston Roelants (born 1937), athlete
- Frederik Veuchelen (born 1978), cyclist
