= Geetbets =

- Municipality
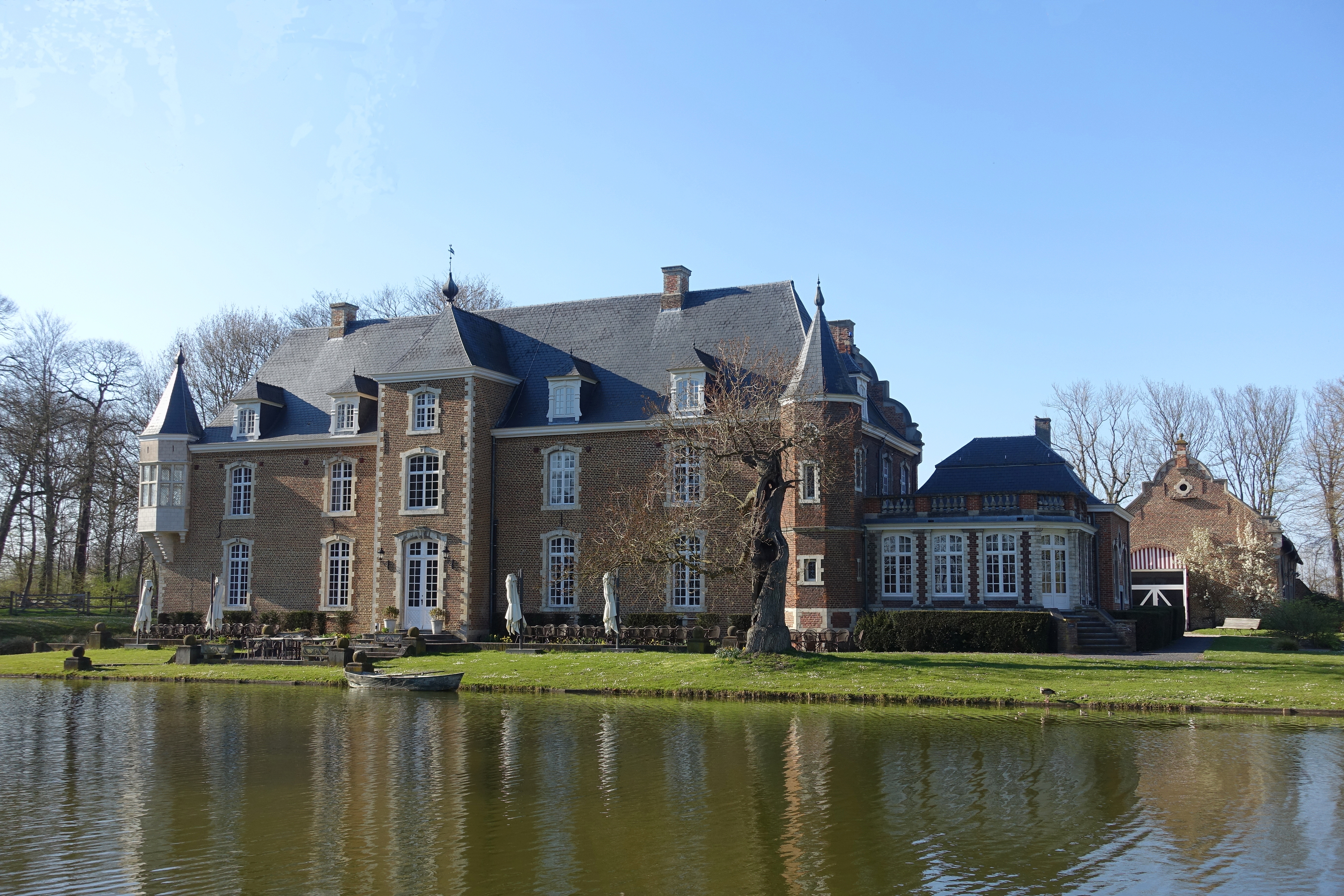

- Flag Coat of arms

- Location of Geetbets in Flemish Brabant
- Interactive map of Geetbets
- Location in Belgium
- Coordinates: 50°53′N 05°07′E
- Country: Belgium
- Community: Flemish Community
- Region: Flemish Region
- Province: Flemish Brabant
- Arrondissement: Leuven

Government
  - Mayor: Jo Roggen (OpenVLD)
  - Governing parties: OpenVLD, Hart Dorp

Area
  - Total: 35.52 km^{2} (13.71 sq mi)

Population (2018-01-01)
  - Total: 6,035
  - Density: 169.9/km^{2} (440.1/sq mi)
- Postal codes: 3450, 3454
- NIS code: 24028
- Area codes: 011, 013
- Website: www.geetbets.be

Geetbets (Dutch pronunciation: [ˌɣeːdˈbɛts]) is a municipality located in the Belgian province of Flemish Brabant. The municipality comprises the towns of Geetbets proper, Grazen and Rummen. On January 1, 2006, Geetbets had a total population of 5,765. The total area is 35.17 km^{2} which gives a population density of 164 inhabitants per km^{2}.

== Notable people ==
Jane Brigode (born Jane Ouwerx) (Rummen, 30 May 1870-Forest, 3 May 1952), a Belgian liberal and politician.
