= Boutersem =

- Municipality
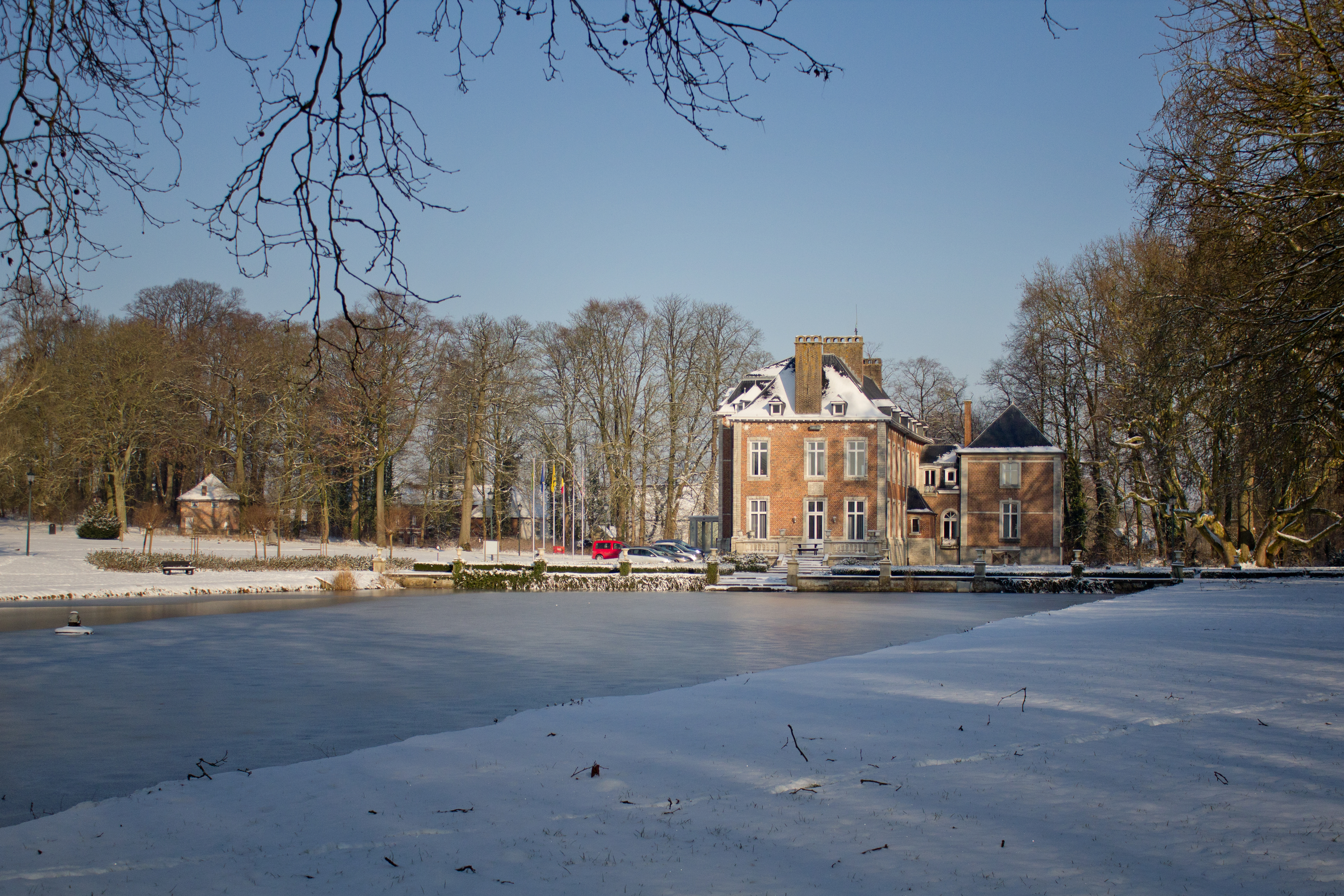
- Castle of Kwabeek, Vertrijk

- Flag Coat of arms

- Location of Boutersem in Flemish Brabant
- Interactive map of Boutersem
- Location in Belgium
- Coordinates: 50°51′N 04°50′E
- Country: Belgium
- Community: Flemish Community
- Region: Flemish Region
- Province: Flemish Brabant
- Arrondissement: Leuven

Government
  - Mayor: Chris Vervliet (CD&V)
  - Governing parties: CD&V, N-VA, Open VLD

Area
  - Total: 31.14 km^{2} (12.02 sq mi)

Population (2018-01-01)
  - Total: 8,167
  - Density: 262.3/km^{2} (679.3/sq mi)
- Postal codes: 3370
- NIS code: 24016
- Area codes: 016
- Website: www.boutersem.be

Boutersem (Dutch pronunciation: [ˈbʌutərsɛm]) is a municipality located in the Belgian province of Flemish Brabant. The municipality now comprises the towns of Boutersem proper, Kerkom, Neervelp, Roosbeek, Vertrijk and Willebringen. On January 1, 2006, Boutersem had a total population of 7,532. The total area is 30.75 km^{2} which gives a population density of 245 inhabitants per km^{2}.
