= Etruscan architecture =

Architecture of the Etruscan civilization

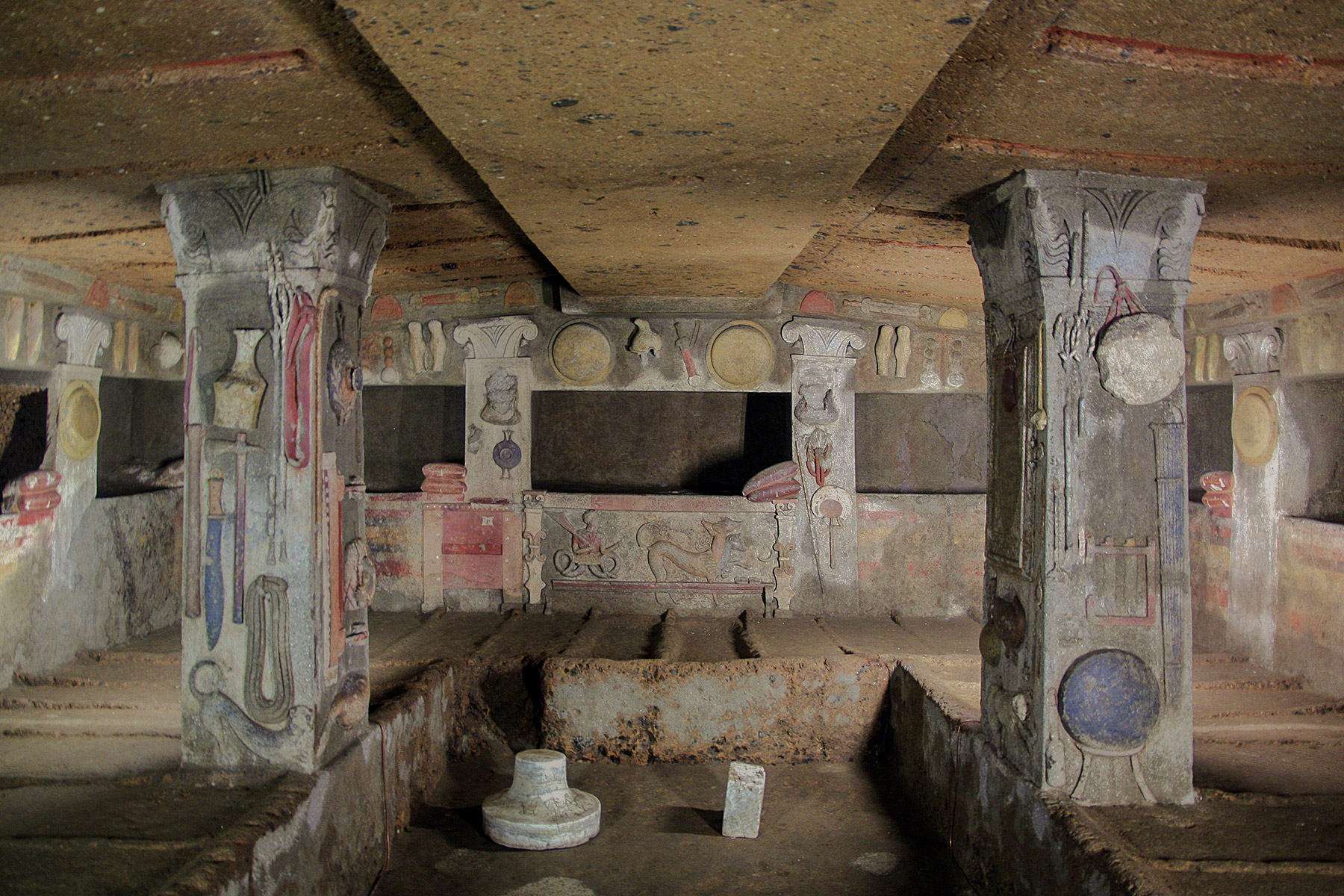
Tomb of the Reliefs at Banditaccia necropolis

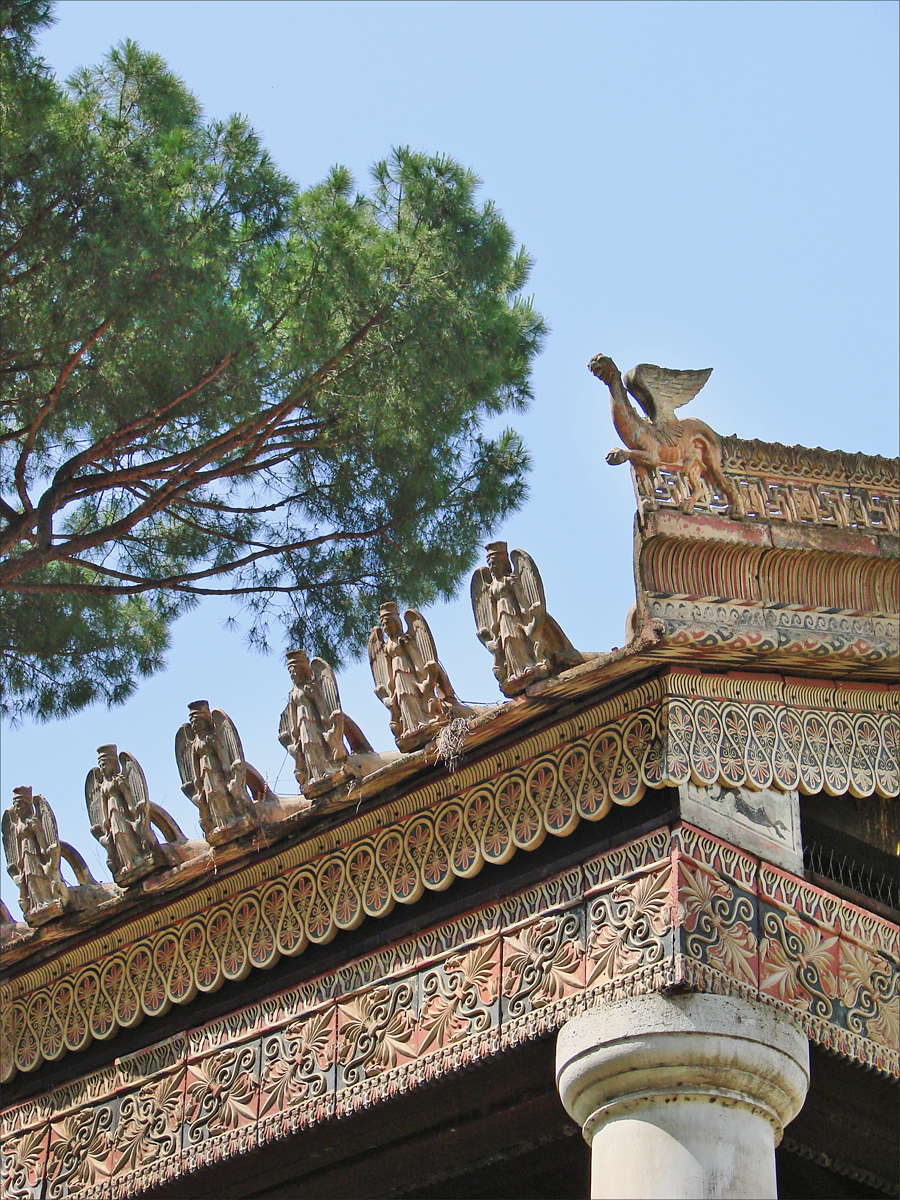
Detail of the Villa Giulia temple reconstruction

Etruscan architecture was created between about 900 BC and 27 BC, when the expanding civilization of ancient Rome finally absorbed Etruscan civilization. The Etruscans were considerable builders in stone, wood and other materials of temples, houses, tombs and city walls, as well as bridges and roads. The only structures remaining in quantity in anything like their original condition are tombs and walls, but through archaeology and other sources we have a good deal of information on what once existed.

From about 630 BC, Etruscan architecture was heavily influenced by Greek architecture, which was itself developing through the same period. In turn it influenced Roman architecture, which in its early centuries can be considered as just a regional variation of Etruscan architecture. But increasingly, from about 200 BC, the Romans looked directly to Greece for their styling, while sometimes retaining Etruscan shapes and purposes in their buildings.

The main monumental forms of Etruscan architecture, listed in decreasing order of the surviving remains, were: the houses of the wealthy elite, the mysterious "monumental complexes", temples, city walls, and rock-cut tombs. Apart from the podia of temples and some house foundations, only the walls and rock-cut tombs were mainly in stone, and have therefore often largely survived.

== Temples ==
The early Etruscans seem to have worshipped in open air enclosures, marked off but not built over; sacrifices continued to be performed outside rather than inside temples in traditional Roman religion until its end. It was only around 600 BC, at the height of their civilization, that they began to create monumental temples, undoubtedly influenced by the Greeks. That these buildings developed essentially from the largest types of Etruscan house has been both asserted and challenged.

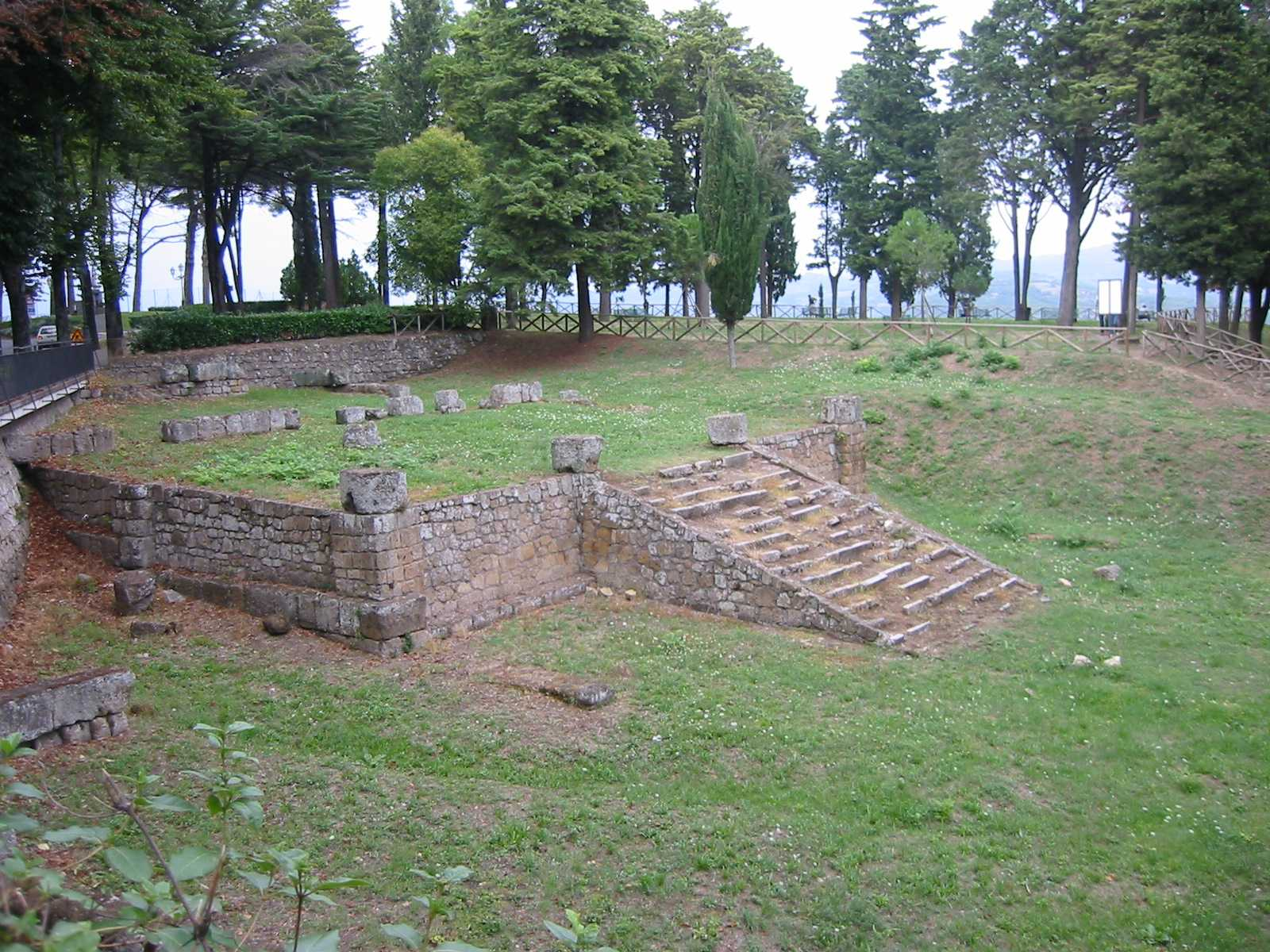
Temple podium at Orvieto; above this level stone was probably not used

Usually, only the podium or base platform used stone, with the upper parts of wood and mud-brick, greatly reducing what survives for archaeologists. However, there is evidence for the portico columns sometimes using stone, as at Veii. This has left much about Etruscan temples uncertain. The only written account of significance on their architecture is by Vitruvius (died after 15 BC), writing some two centuries after the Etruscan civilization was absorbed by Rome. He describes how to plan a "Tuscan temple" that appears to be a Roman "Etruscan-style" (tuscanicae dispositiones) temple of a type perhaps still sometimes built in his own day, rather than a really historically minded attempt to describe original Etruscan buildings, though he may well have seen examples of these.

Many aspects of his description fit what archaeologists can demonstrate, but others do not. It is in any case clear that Etruscan temples could take a number of forms, and also varied over the 400-year period during which they were being made. Nonetheless, Vitruvius remains the inevitable starting point for a description, and a contrast of Etruscan temples with their Greek and Roman equivalents. There are also a few model temples in pottery, and depictions on tombs or vases. Remains of the architectural terracotta elements sometimes survive in considerable quantities, and museums, mostly in Italy, have good collections of attractively shaped and painted antefixes in particular.

Vitruvius specifies three doors and three cellae, one for each of the main Etruscan deities, but archaeological remains do not suggest this was normal, though it is found. Roman sources were in the habit of ascribing to the Etruscans a taste for triads in things such as city planning (with three gates to cities, for example), in ways that do not seem to reflect reality. The orientation of the temple is not consistent, and may have been determined by a priest watching the flight of birds at the time of foundation.

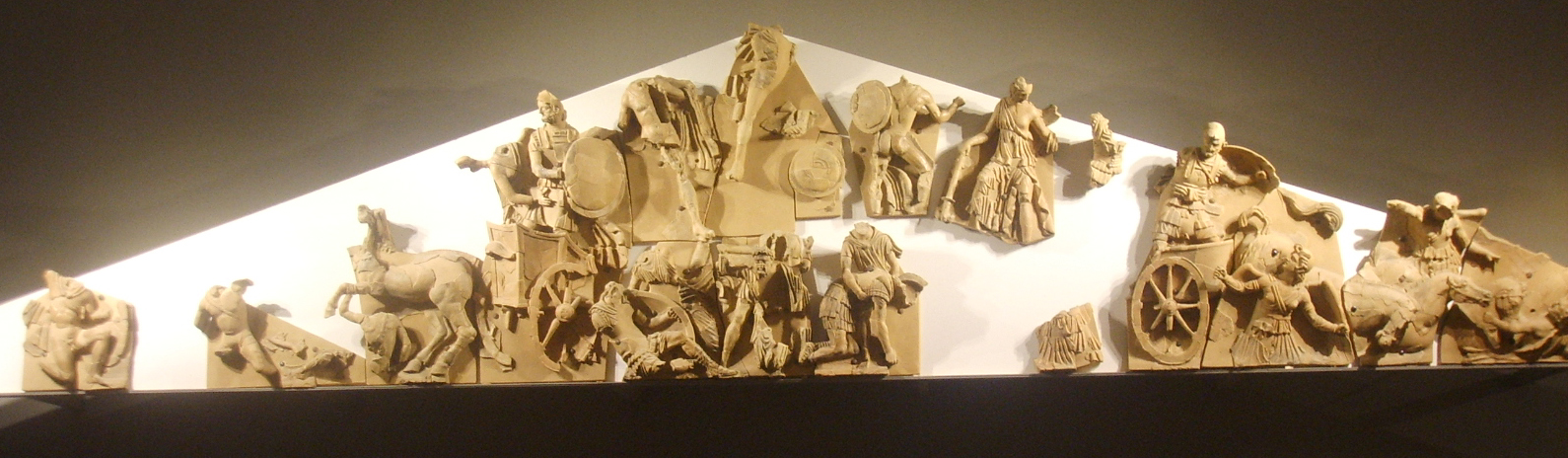
Late terracotta pediment (part-reconstructed) from Talamone

The exteriors of both Greek and Roman temples were originally highly decorated and colourful, especially in the entablature and roofs, and this was if anything even more true of Etruscan temples. When wood was used for columns, the bases and capitals were often encased in painted terracotta. All the edges of the roof were decorated, mostly in brightly painted terracotta, and there seem often to have been a row of sculptures along the central ridge of the roof, going beyond the acroterion group above a pediment in Greek and Roman temples. The Apollo of Veii was part of an acroterion group. Substantial but broken remains of late sculptured pediment groups survive in museums, in fact rather more than from Greek or Roman temples, partly because the terracotta was not capable of "recycling" as marble was. The groups from Luni and Talamone (both now in Florence) are among the most impressive.

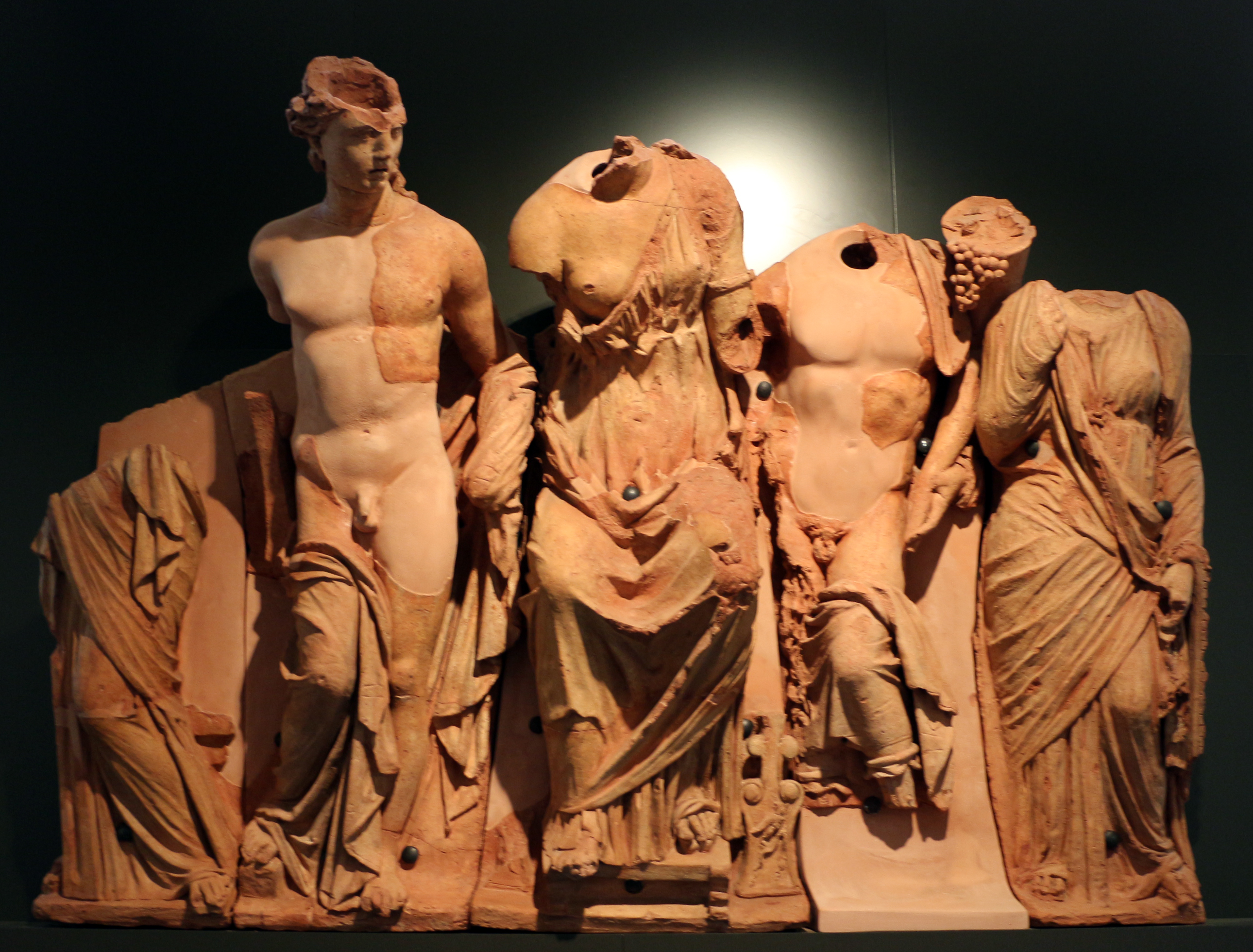
Remains of terracotta pediment group from Luna (paler areas reconstructed)

Features shared by typical Etruscan and Roman temples, and contrasting with Greek ones, begin with a strongly frontal approach, with great emphasis on the front facade, less on the sides, and very little on the back. The podia are also usually higher, and can only be entered at a section of the front, just presenting a blank platform wall elsewhere. There may only be columns at the front portico. In Etruscan temples, more than Roman ones, the portico is deep, often representing, as Vitruvius recommends, half of the area under the roof, with multiple rows of columns.

At least in later temples, versions of Greek Aeolic, Ionic and Corinthian capitals are found, as well as the main Tuscan order, a simpler version of the Doric, but the attention to the full Greek detailing in the entablature that the Romans pursued seems to have been lacking. Fluted Tuscan/Doric columns can also be found, against Greek and later Roman conventions.

Etruscan architecture shared with Ancient Egyptian architecture the use of large cavetto mouldings as a cornice, though not on the same massive scale. The cavetto took the place of the Greek cymatium in many temples, often painted with vertical "tongue" patterns (as in the reconstructed Etruscan temple at Villa Giulia, illustrated above), and combined with the distinctive "Etruscan round moulding", often painted with scales.

=== Temple of Jupiter Optimus Maximus ===
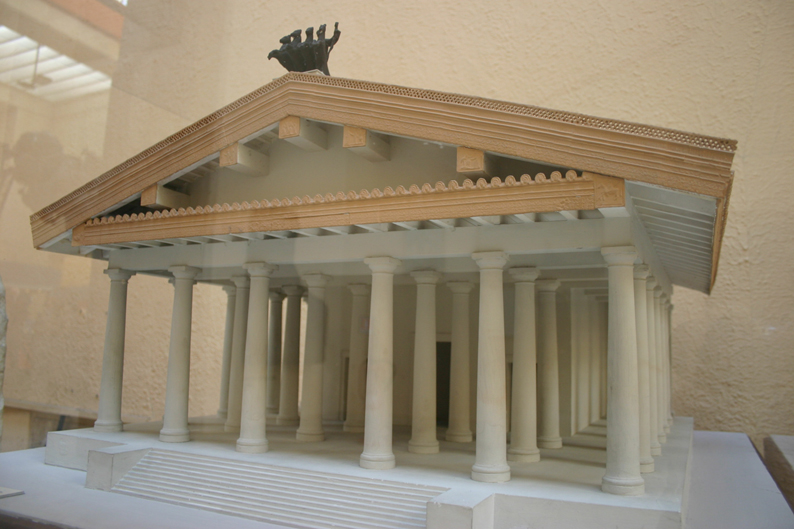
Speculative model of the first Temple of Jupiter Optimus Maximus in Rome

The first building of the Temple of Jupiter Optimus Maximus on the Capitoline Hill was the oldest large temple in Rome, dedicated to the Capitoline Triad consisting of Jupiter and his companion deities, Juno and Minerva, and had a cathedral-like position in the official religion of Rome. Its first version was traditionally dedicated in 509 BC, but in 83 BC it was destroyed by fire, and was rebuilt as a Greek-style temple, which was completed in 69 BC (there were to be two more fires and new buildings). For the first temple Etruscan specialists were brought in for various aspects of the building, including making and painting the extensive terracotta elements of the entablature or upper parts, such as antefixes. But for the second building they were summoned from Greece.

The first version is the largest Etruscan temple recorded, and much larger than other Roman temples for centuries after. However, its size remains heavily disputed by specialists; based on an ancient visitor it has been claimed to have been almost 60 m × 60 m (200 ft × 200 ft), not far short of the largest Greek temples. Whatever its size, its influence on other early Roman temples was significant and long-lasting. Reconstructions usually show very wide eaves, and a wide colonnade stretching down the sides, though not round the back wall as it would have done in a Greek temple. A crude image on a coin of 78 BC shows only four columns, and a very busy roofline.

Temple plan, following Vitruvius and the Portonaccio Minerva temple, with three doors

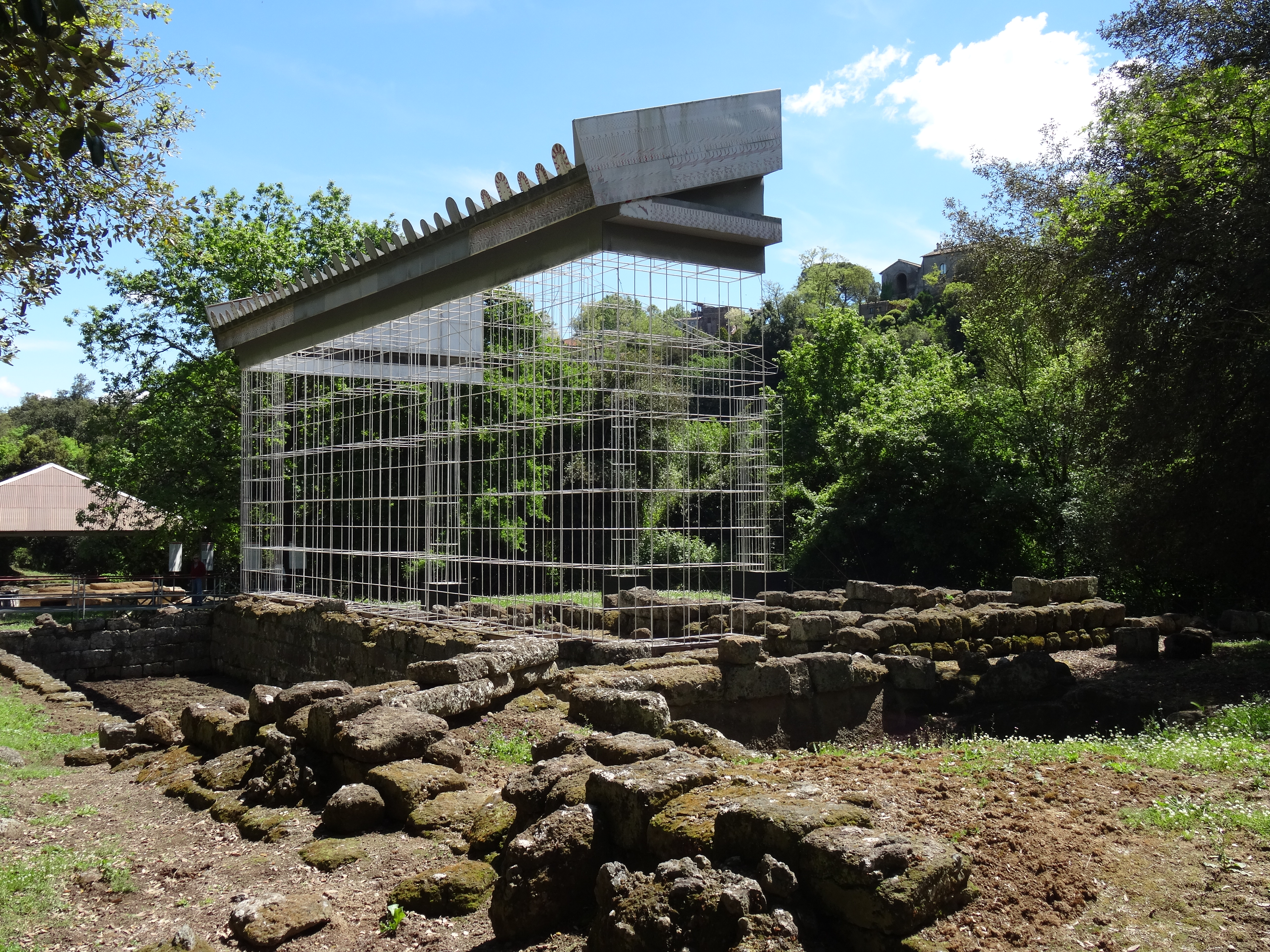
Temple of Apollo, Veii, with partial modern visualization

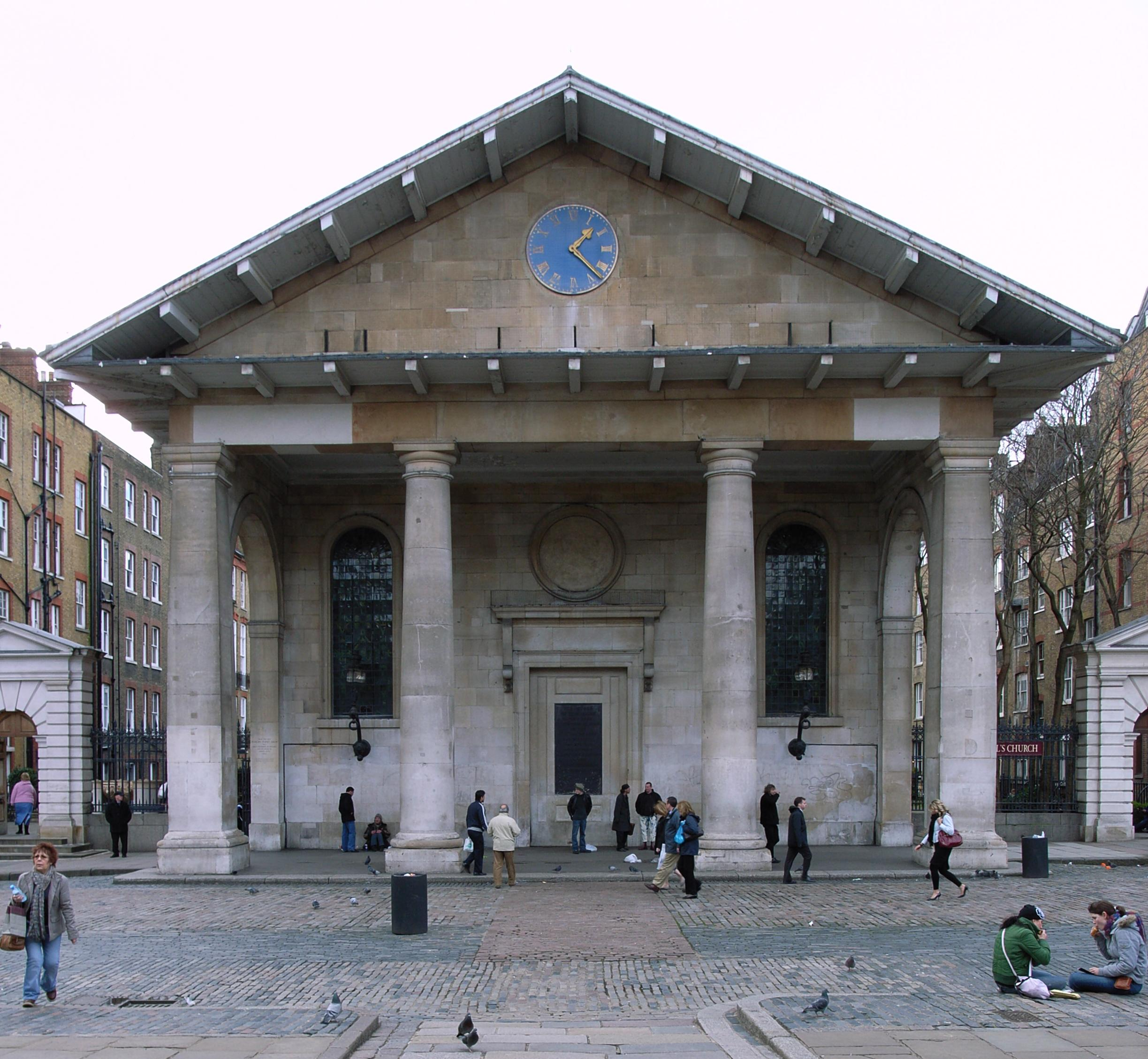
St Paul's, Covent Garden, London, 1630s, largely follows Vitruvius's directions for a "Tuscan temple", but lacks external decoration and colour.

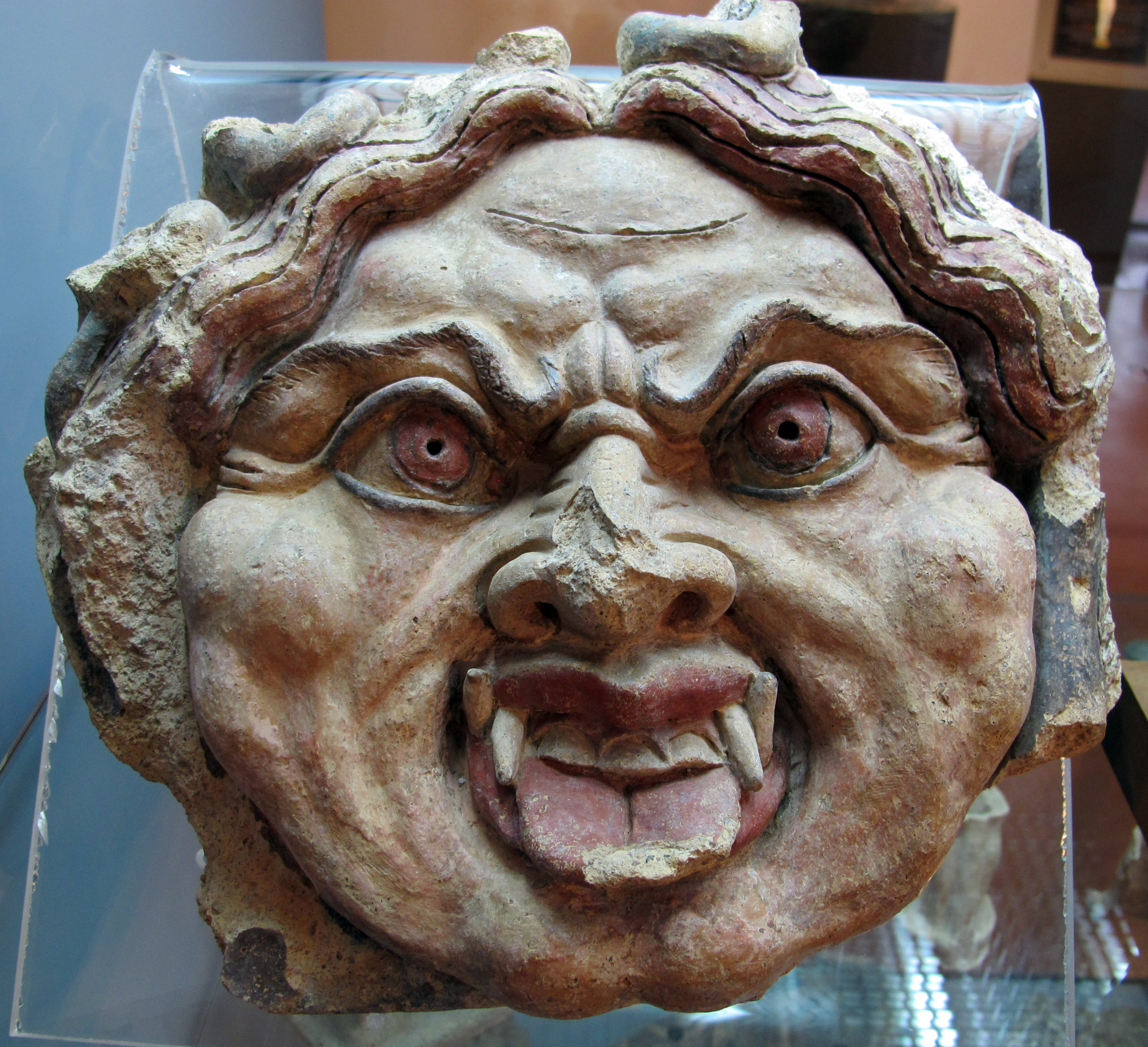
Gorgon antefix, Orvieto, end of the 5th century BC. Heads of both Silenus and gorgons were common subjects for antefixes.

Winged-Horses of Tarquinia, 4th century BC

== Monumental complexes ==
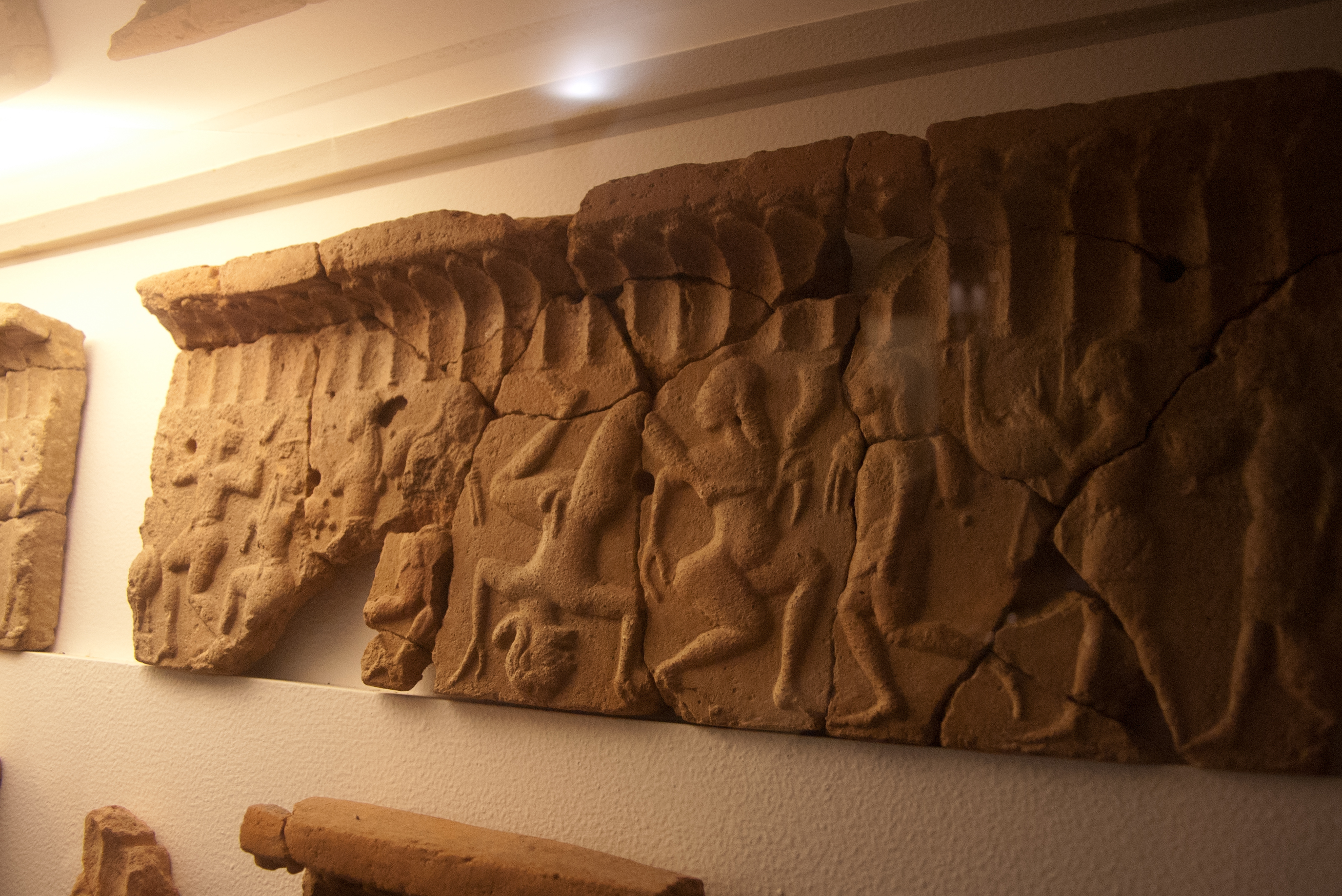
Frieze from Acquarossa (Zone F)

"Monumental complex" or building is a term used for a few large sets of buildings relatively recently uncovered by archaeology, the term reflecting a lack of certainty over their function. The two leading examples are the Archaic building at Poggio Civitate and another at Acquarossa (Zone F); both are 6th-century or earlier. Both have sets of buildings round a courtyard, which use stone, at least in the foundations, roof tiles, and elaborate decorations in architectural terracotta. Their size is exceptional for their early date. One obvious possible function is as palatial dwellings; another is as civic buildings, acting as places for assembly, and commemoration of aspects of the community. Only the stone foundations and ceramic fragments remain for excavations to discover.

== Houses ==
It seems clear from the richer tombs that the Etruscan elite lived in fairly spacious comfort, but there is little evidence as to what their homes looked like, although some furniture is shown in tomb frescos. The rock-cut tomb chambers often form suites of "rooms", some quite large, which presumably resemble in part the atrium homes of the better-off Etruscans. Unlike several of the necropoli, Etruscan cities have generally been built over from the Romans onwards, and houses have left little trace. Where remains survive, there are tightly packed tufa bases, with perhaps mud-brick above, but in some places the lower parts of tufa walls survive even in small houses. One complete set of foundations shows a house 7.9m by 3.9m (25 x 13 feet). At large farms, mines, quarries and perhaps other sites employing many people, workers lived in dormitories.

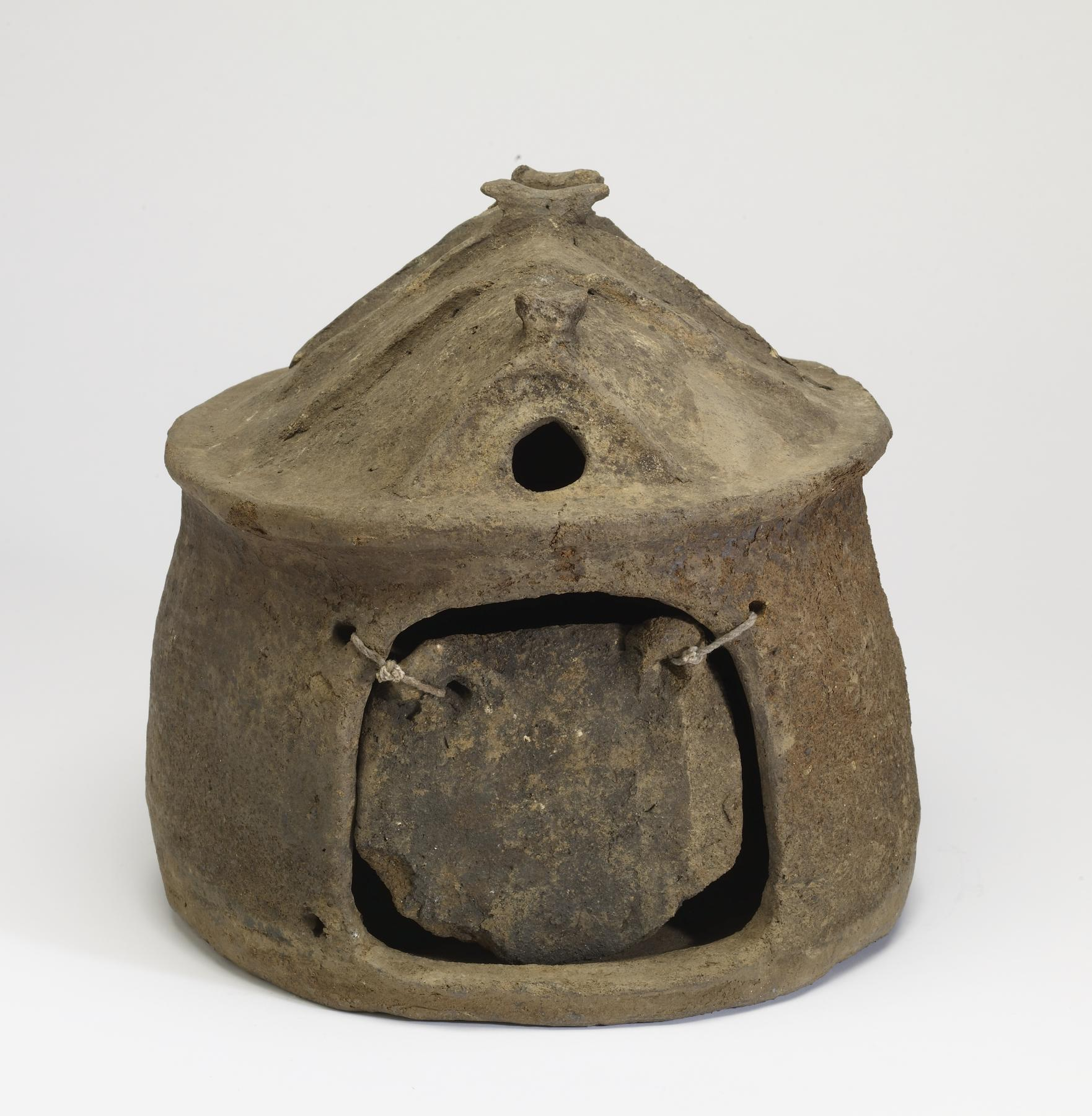
Etruscan cinerary hut-urn (Villanovan period, 9th–8th century BC), showing the likely shape of an early hut: a simple mud-and-straw shelter

A form of models of houses in pottery, and sometimes bronze, called "hut urns" gives us some indications. These were apparently used to hold cremated ashes, and are found in the Etruscan Iron Age Villanovan culture and early burials, especially in northern areas. The hut urns show a conventional model with a single interior space. They are usually round or slightly oval, often with prominent wooden beams laid in two rows on the sloping roof, which cross at the central ridge and project some way in "V"s into the air; these projections seem to have been sometimes carved or otherwise decorated. The urns always have a large square-ish door for access, sometimes two, and the outline of windows in the walls may be indicated by ridges or marks in the clay. There is very often a window and exit for smoke, above the door in the roof, and at the opposite end.

Such houses were made of earth and organic materials, using mud brick and wattle and daub. Stone hearths and perhaps stone rings at the base are found. Even the well-off seem rarely to have lived in stone houses, and rock-cut tomb chambers often represent wooden ceilings in stone. The "Tomb of the Reliefs" at Banditaccia suggests that possessions such as tools and weapons were often hung from the walls for storage.

On the Palatine Hill in Rome, the Casa Romuli ("House of Romulus") was long preserved, and when necessary rebuilt as before. It was a hut made of wood posts and roof beams, wattle and daub walls and a thatched roof, and possibly typical of ordinary Etruscan housing outside crowded city centres. The site cannot be identified with certainty, but at one candidate location circle of six post-holes plus a central one have been found, cut into the tufa bedrock, with an ovoid 4.9m x 3.6m perimeter.

== Tombs and tumuli ==
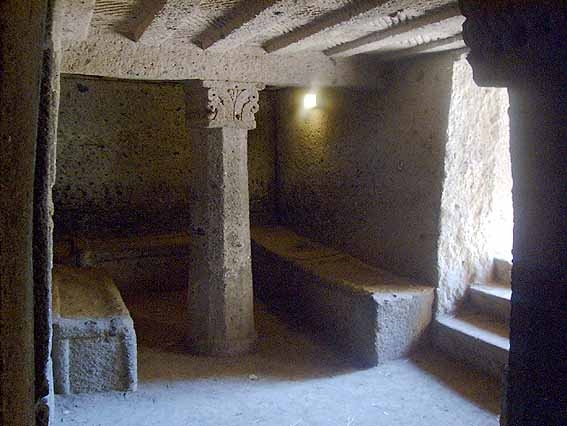
Banditaccia necropolis, Tomb of the Capitelli

Rich Etruscans left elaborate tombs, mostly gathered in large necropoli some way outside their cities. These were generously filled with grave goods, especially ceramics, which give us most of our understanding of Etruscan culture. Typically, in the tufa regions of southern Etruria, the burial chamber was cut from solid rock below ground, which is relatively easy with this rock, but there was a structure above, often rather large. In other regions they are normally built up above ground. They were reused for further burials in the same family over several generations, and would often have become very crowded with sarcophagi and grave goods, though the known survivals have now been emptied, either by looters or archaeologists.

Some tombs are stone buildings, often in rows, rather like small houses. Others are round tumuli with stone retaining walls, with steps down to rock-cut chambers below. Both types are found closely packed together in necropoli like Banditaccia and Monterozzi, the latter containing some 6,000 burials. Several different types of tombs have been identified, reflecting a development through time as well as differences in income. Some types clearly replicate aspects of the richer houses, with a number of connected chambers, columns with capitals, and rock-cut ceilings given beams. Many tombs had fresco paintings, which does not seem to have been a Greek influence (though the style of the paintings are certainly based on Greek art), as the Greeks had ceased to use chamber tombs well before the Etruscans started to paint theirs in about 600; the Egyptians had also ceased painting tombs by then. Womb tombs were also regularly constructed for burying the deceased.

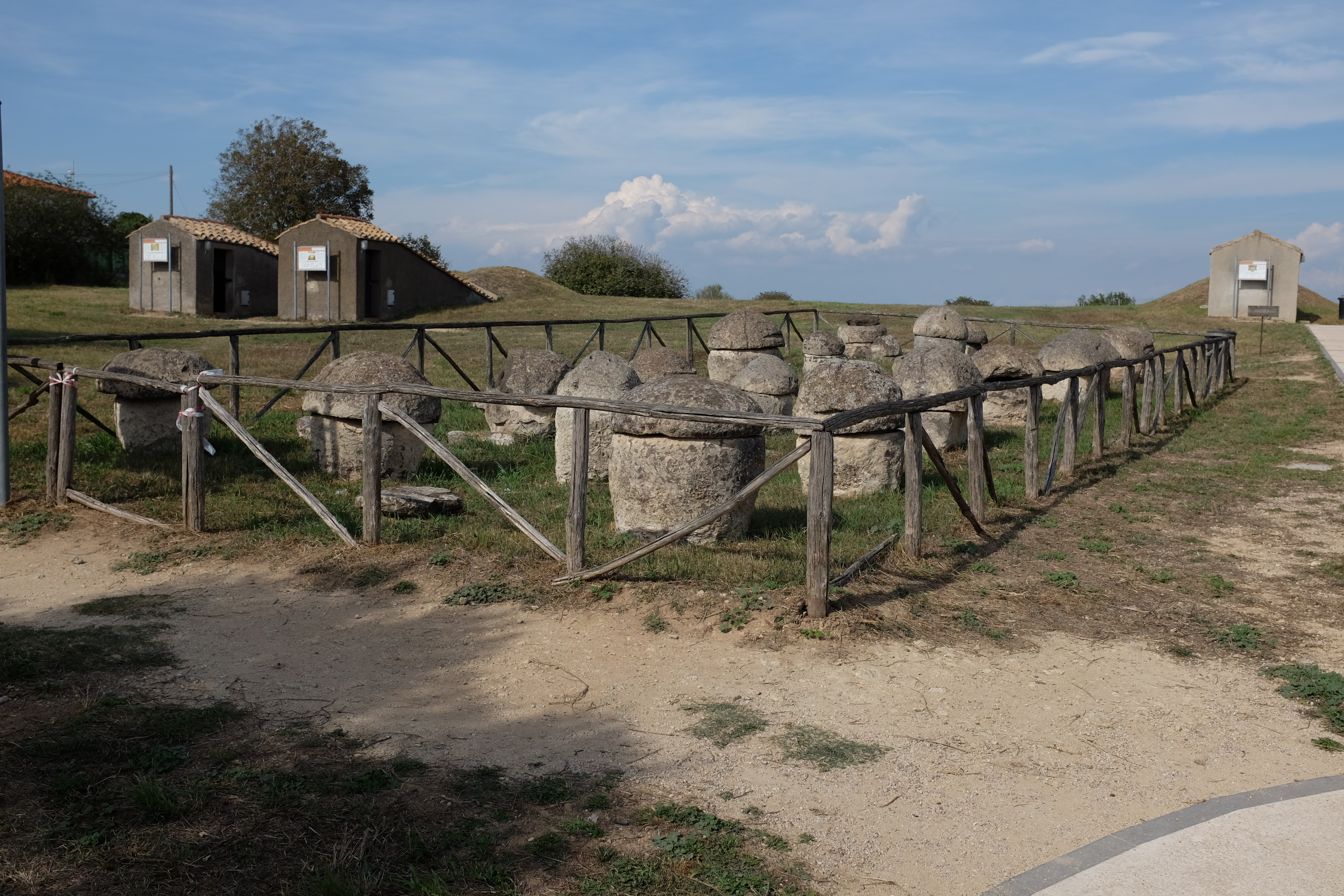
Villanovan period tombs for cremation burials, Necropolis of Monterozzi

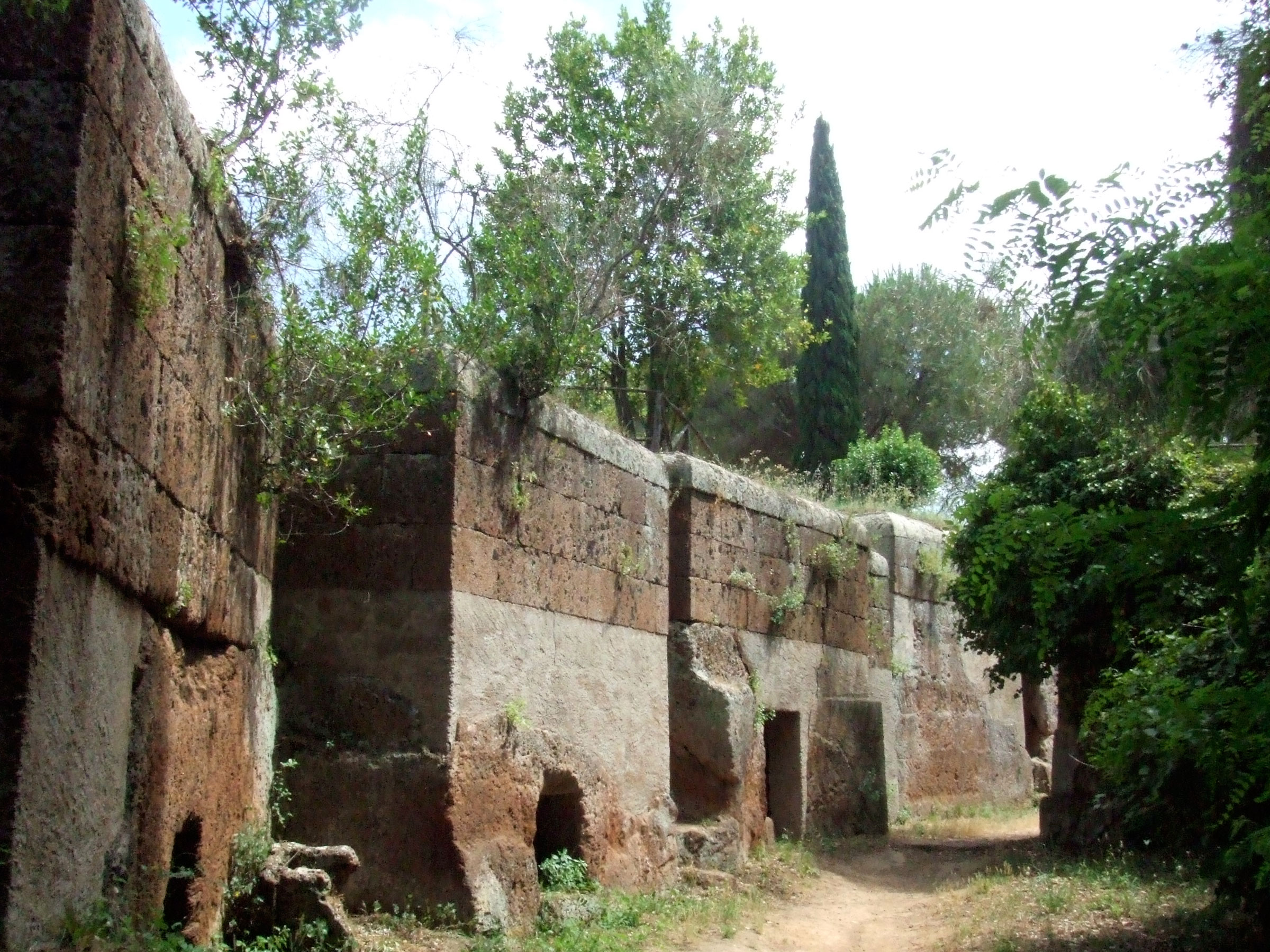
Tombs at Banditaccia necropolis

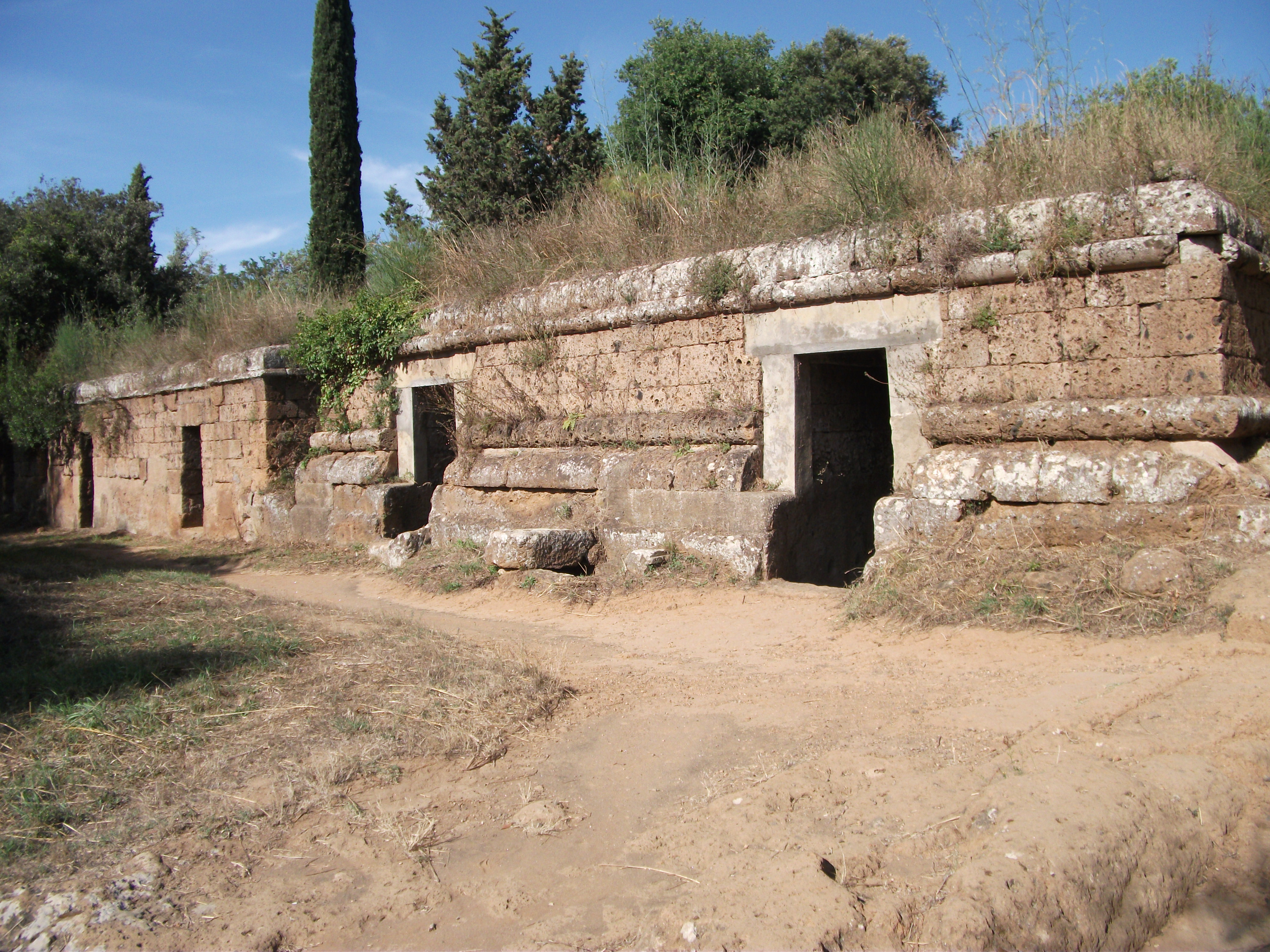
Tombs at Banditaccia necropolis

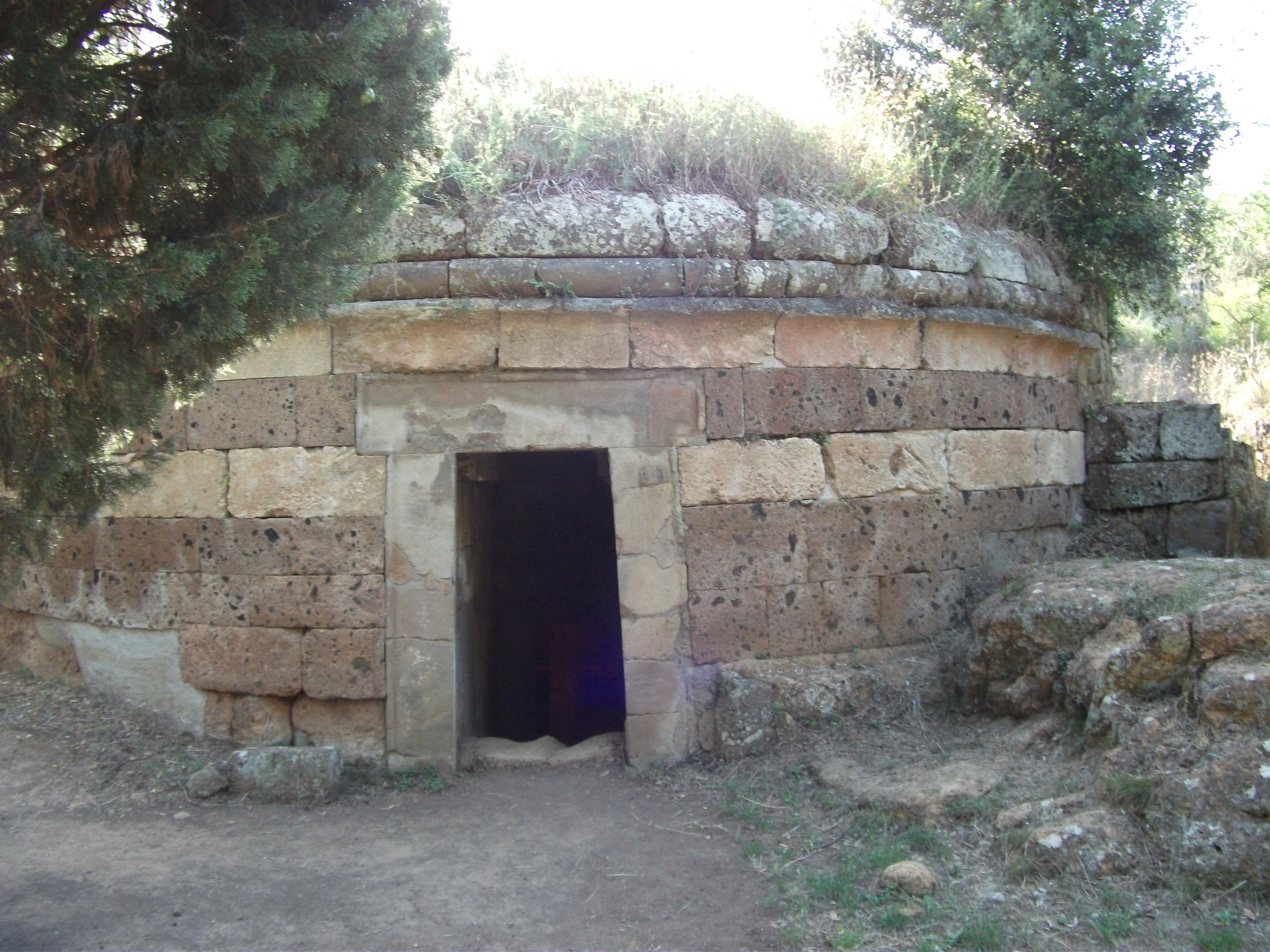
Tumulus at Banditaccia necropolis

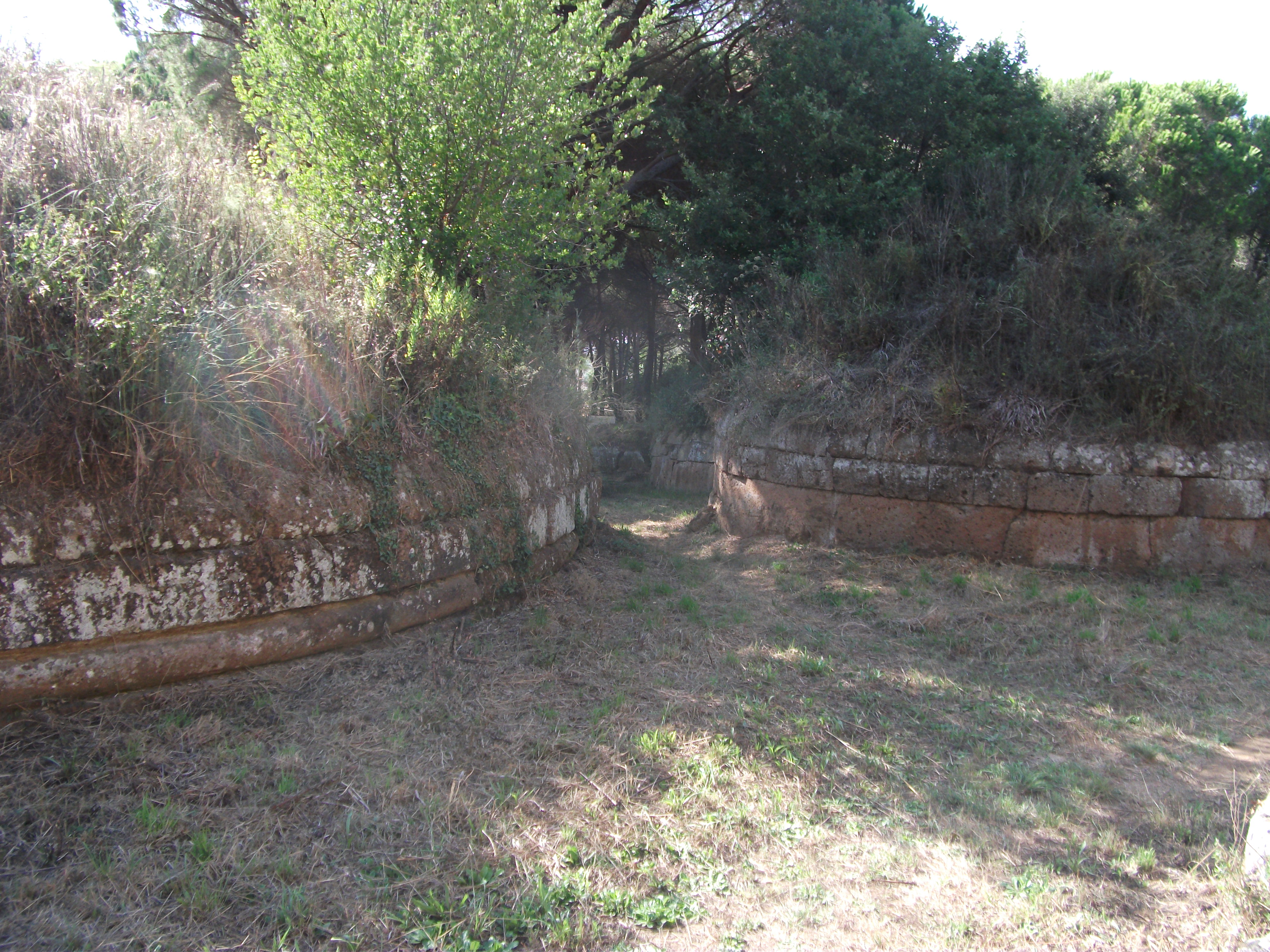
Maze of tumuli at Banditaccia necropolis

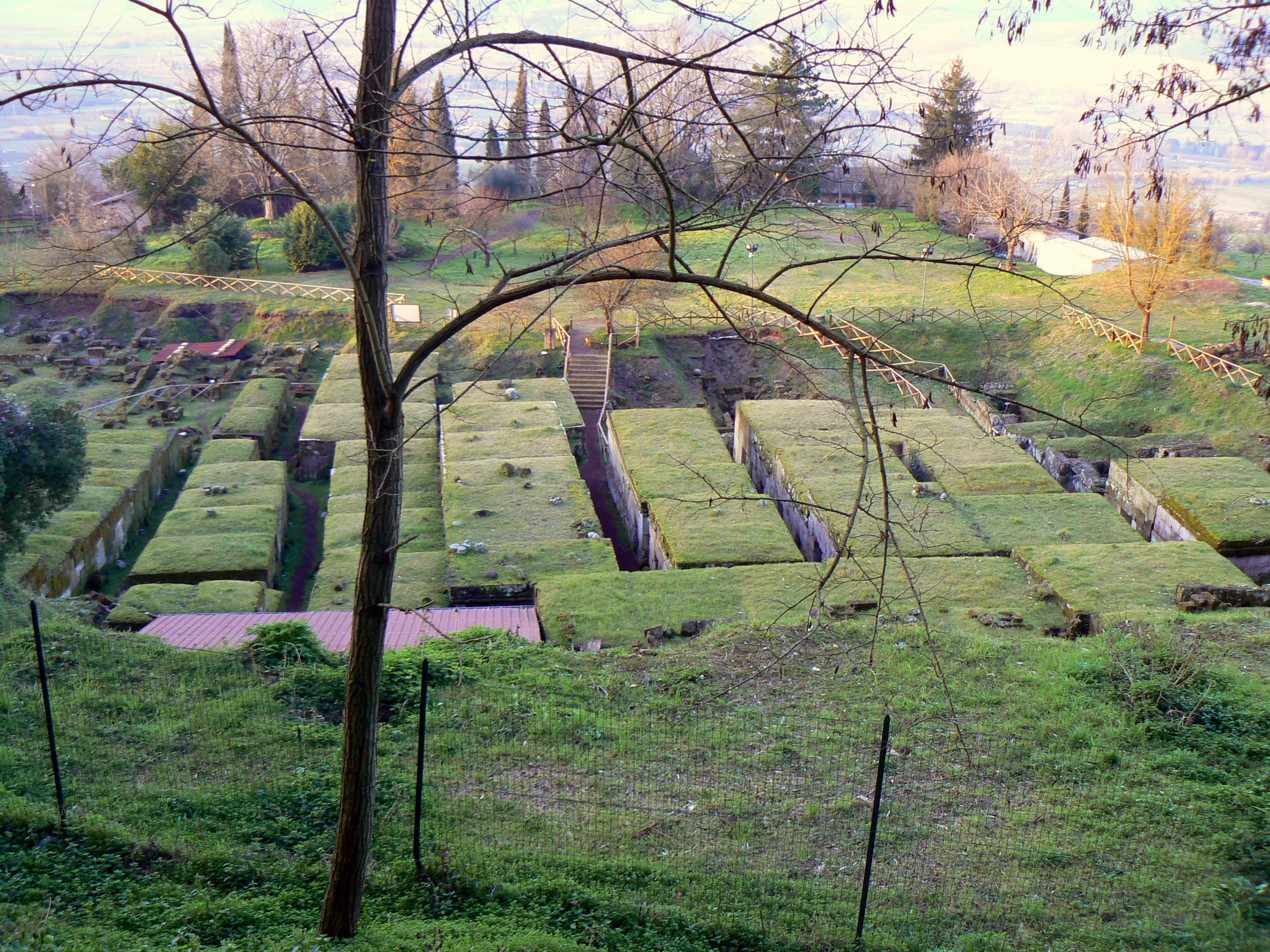
View from above of a crowded necropolis at Orvieto

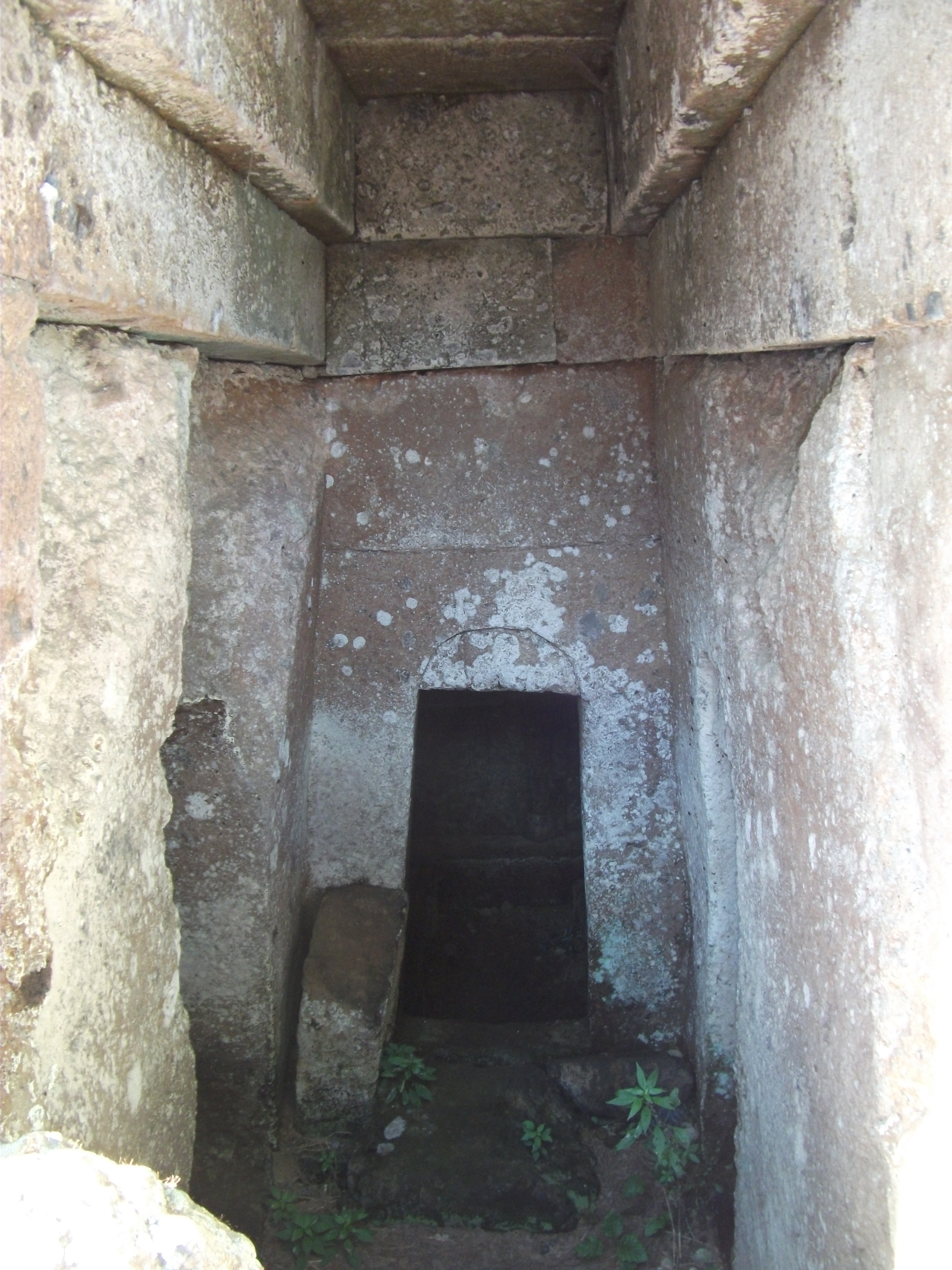
Tomb entry at Banditaccia necropolis

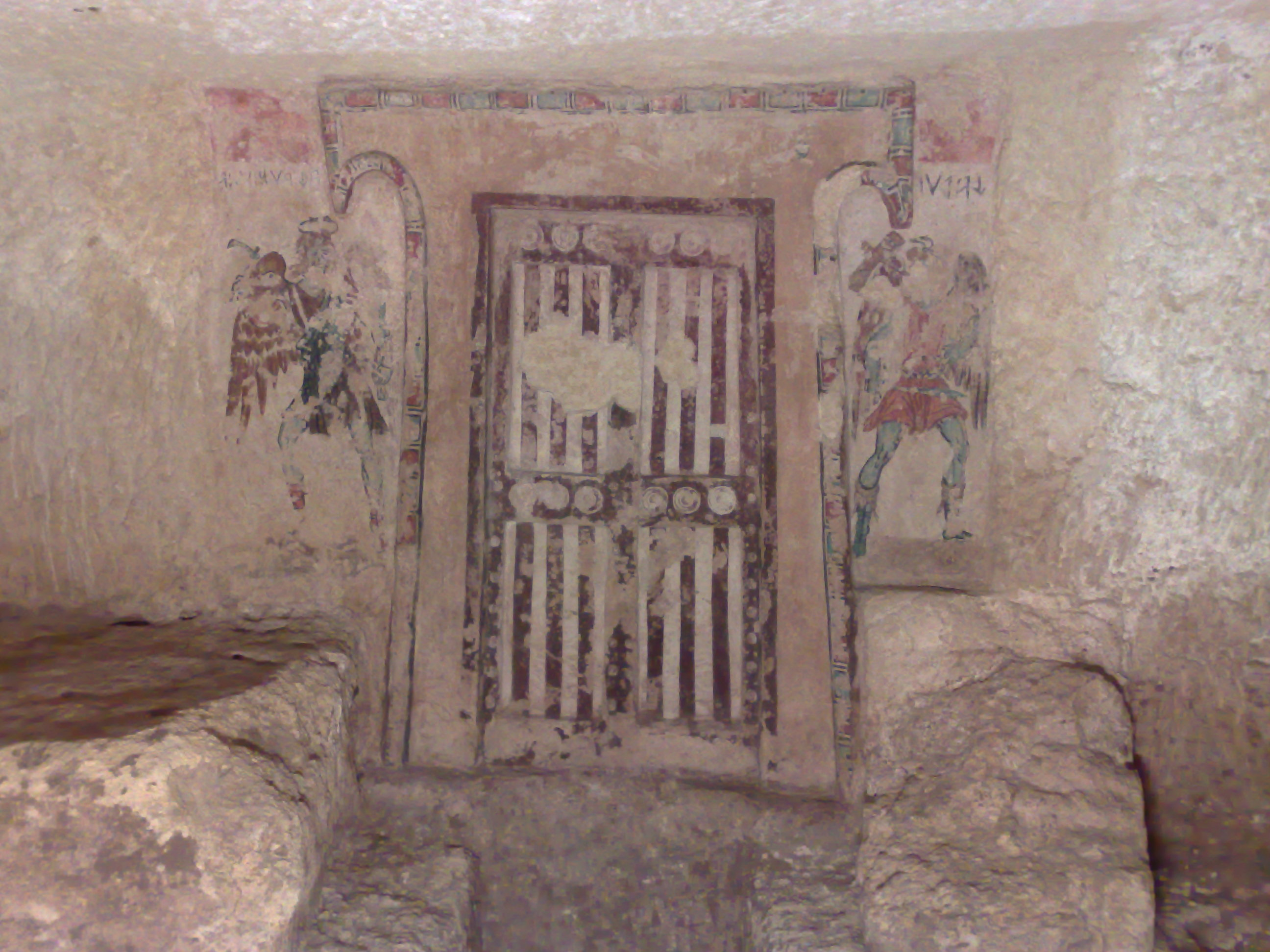
Painted false door; the "hammerhead" surround is a frequent motif

== Walls and fortifications ==
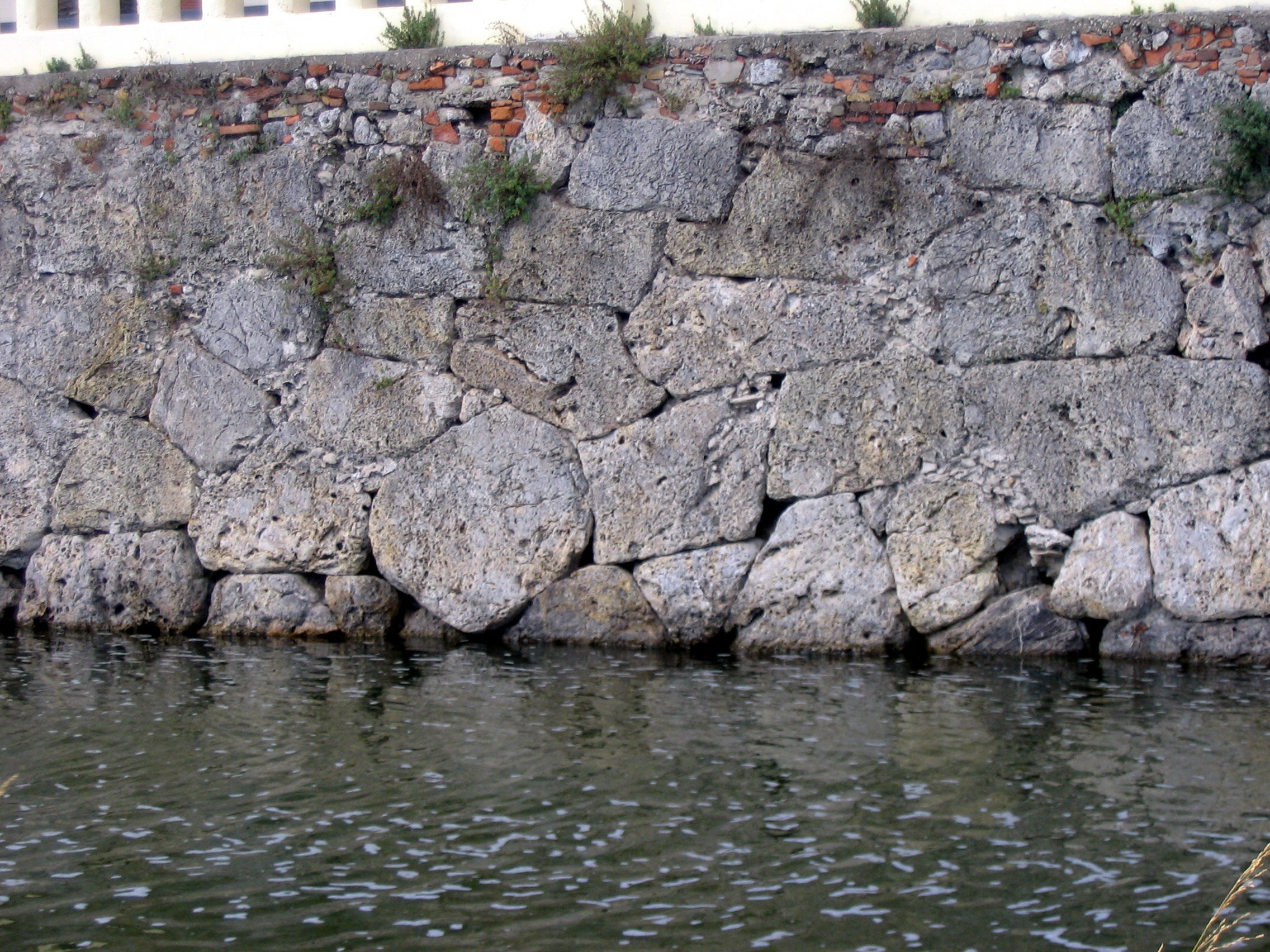
Wall at Orbetello

Etruscan cities, which often sat on hill-tops, became walled from about the 8th century, first in mud-brick, then often in stone. The Romans considered the sulcus primigenius—the sanctification of the course of a future city wall through a ritual plowing—to have been a continuation of similar Etruscan practices. Even before the Romans began to swallow up Etruscan territory, Italy had frequent wars, and by the later period had Celtic enemies to the north, and an expanding Rome to the south. There was an agger or rampart and a fossa or ditch in front of the wall. The towns had a number of gates where roads entered, which were sometimes given arched gateways. The best survivor of these is the 2nd-century Porta Marzia at Perugia, from the end of the period. Here, as in many cases, surviving work comes from the period just around the Roman takeover, but appears to represent Etruscan traditions. By the 4th century, Volterra had two walls, the second enclosing the whole city.

The stonework is often of fine quality, sometimes using regular rectangular blocks in a rough ashlar, and sometimes "cyclopeian", using large polygonal blocks, partly shaped to fit each other, somewhat in the manner of the well-known Inca masonry, though not reaching that level of quality. Gaps are left, which are filled in with much smaller stones.

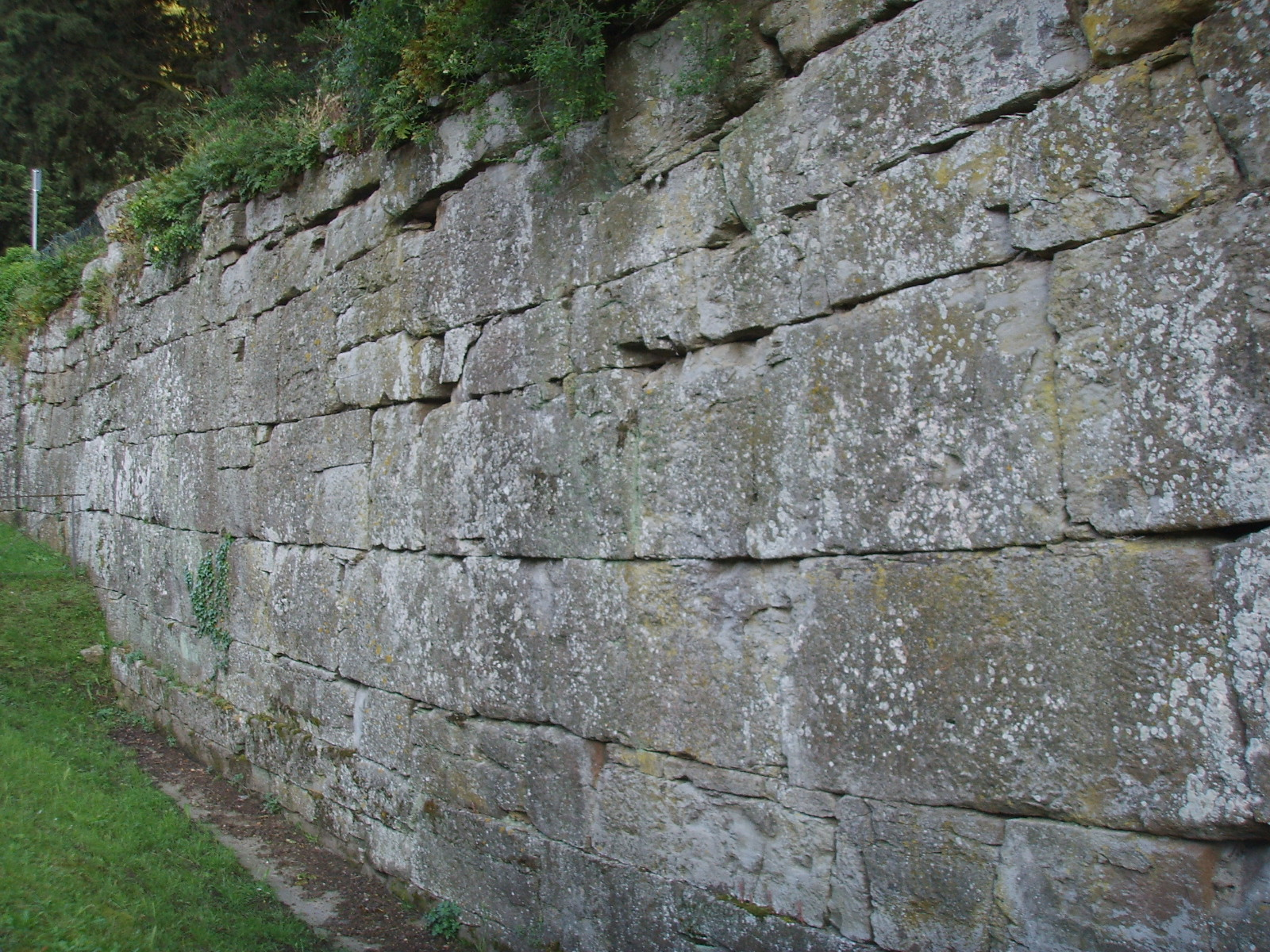
Fiesole, town wall. Fairly regular blocks in courses

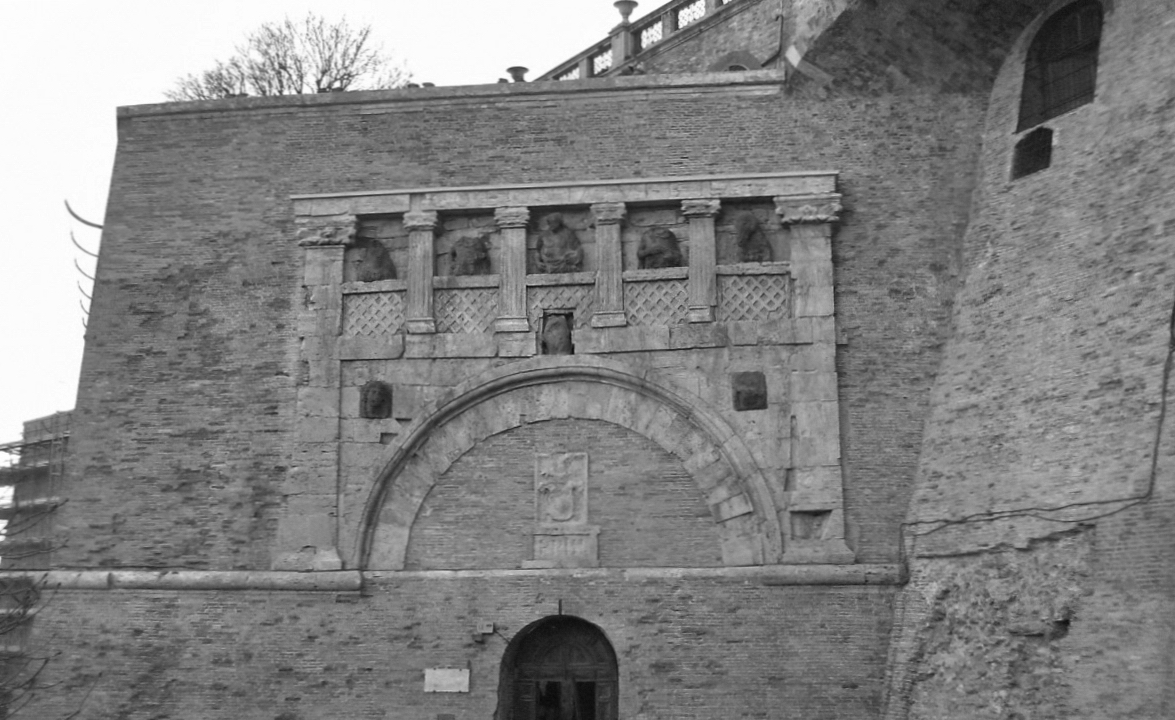
The 2nd-century Porta Marzia at Perugia, its upper part built into a later wall

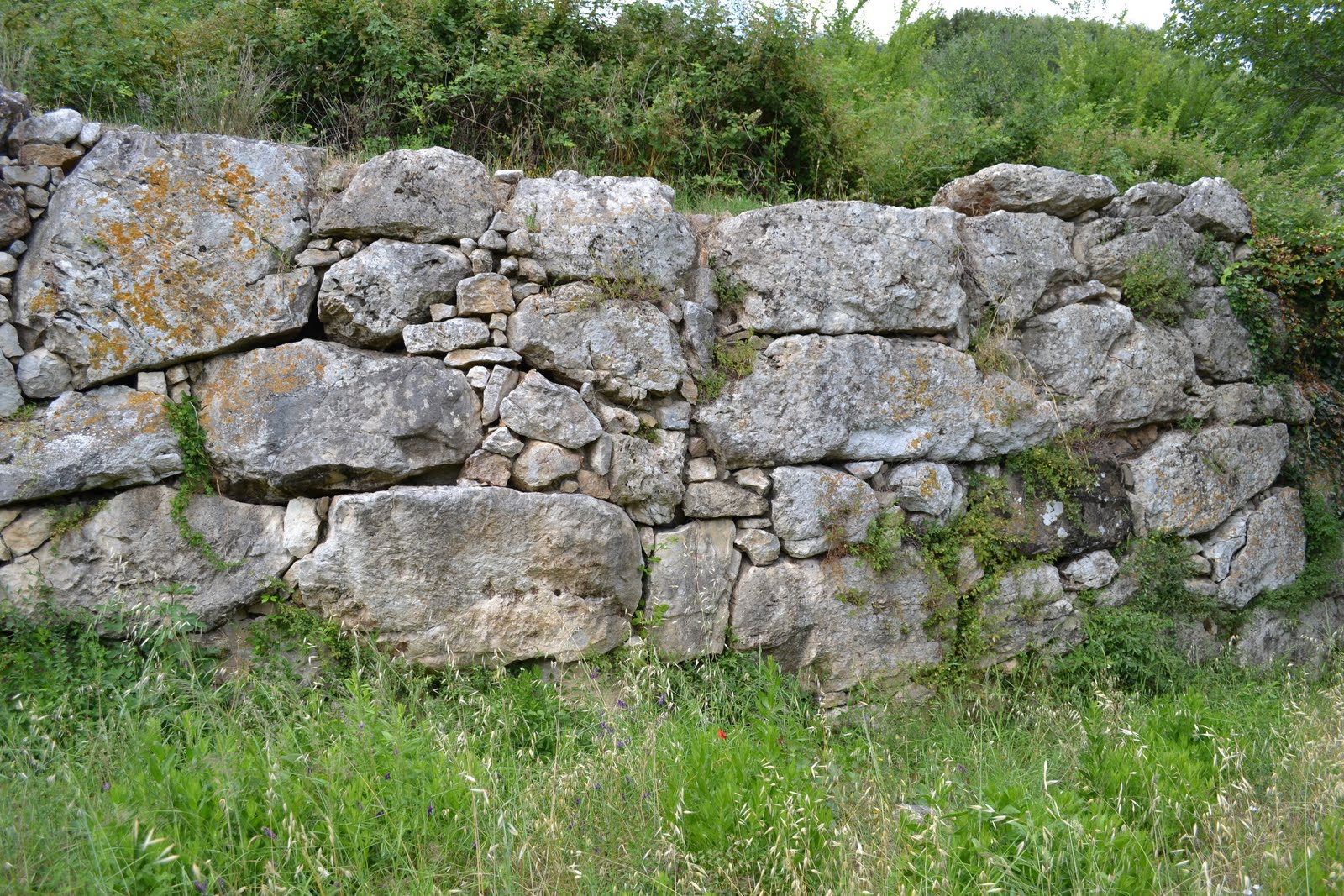
Polygonal masonry wall at Rusellae

== Road network ==
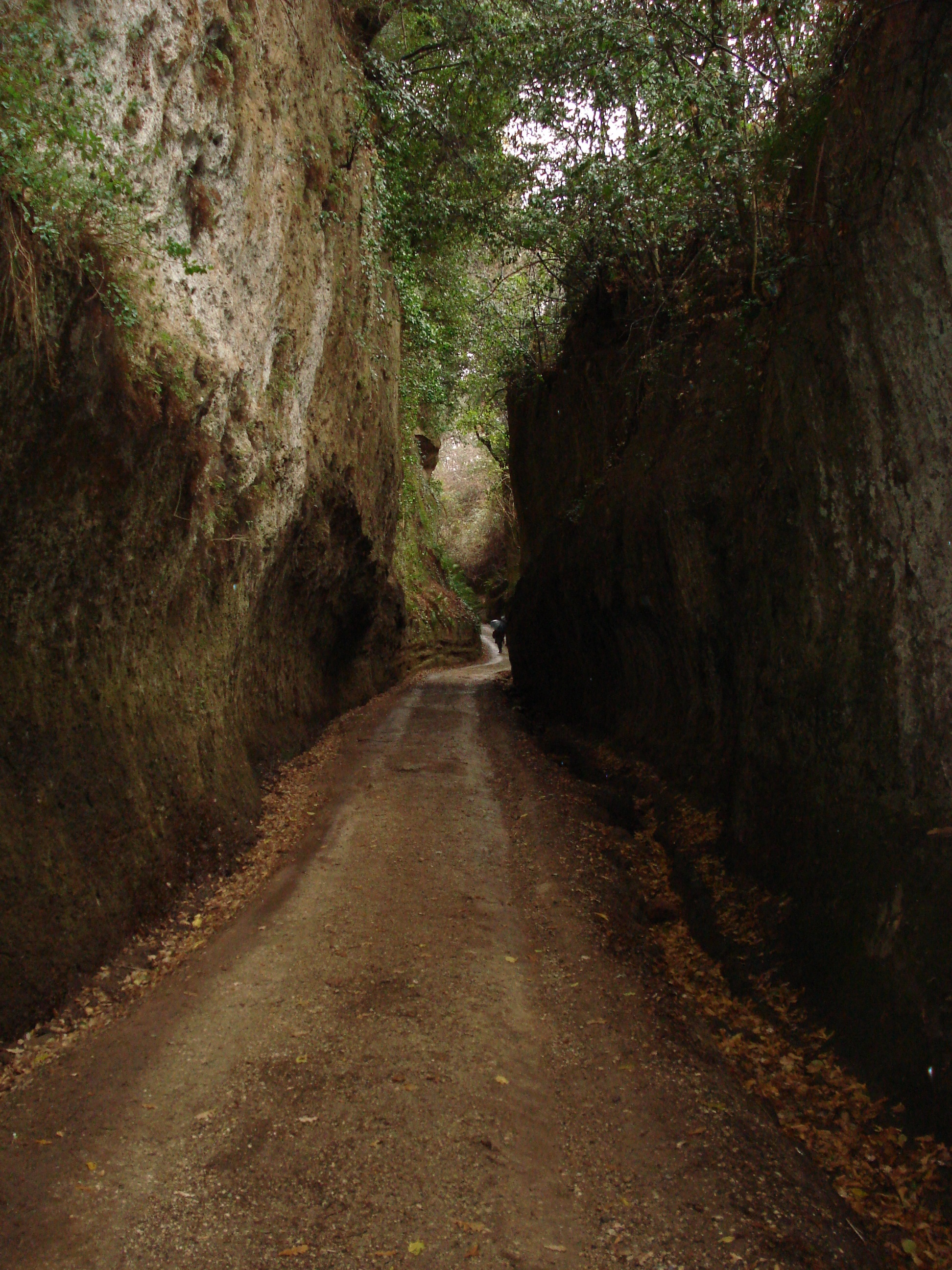
Sunken road or via cava

Several important and unimportant Roman roads, such as the Via Cassia, overlie Etruscan precursors, but there are sufficient Etruscan sites that were neglected after their conquest to allow an understanding of the considerable Etruscan road system. Roads did not just run between cities, but out into the countryside to allow agricultural produce to be easily brought in. While not as heavily engineered as Roman roads, considerable efforts went into creating a road surface that on major routes could be as wide as 10.4 metres, on a 12 kilometre stretch connecting Cerveteri with its port Pyrgi, made in the 5th century. This had a gravel surface, between tufo edging-blocks, and a central drainage channel.

The Vie Cave, narrow cuttings often running deeply through hills, are probably little changed since Etruscan times. As well as connecting sites, these may have had a defensive function in times of war. Their construction may have mainly resulted from the wearing through soft tufo bedrock by iron-rimmed wheels, creating deep ruts that required the road to be frequently recut to a smooth surface. Their dating can only be deduced by that of settlements they pass between, and objects from tombs beside them. The 7th and 6th centuries BC show a move to replace earlier tracks only suitable for mules and pedestrians with wider and more engineered roads capable of taking wheeled vehicles, using gentler but longer routes through hilly country.

Bridges were common, though fords more so where these would suffice. Presumably many were in timber, but some at least used stone underneath a timber roadway.

== See also ==
- Early and simple domes
