= Korbeek-Dijle =

- Deelgemeente
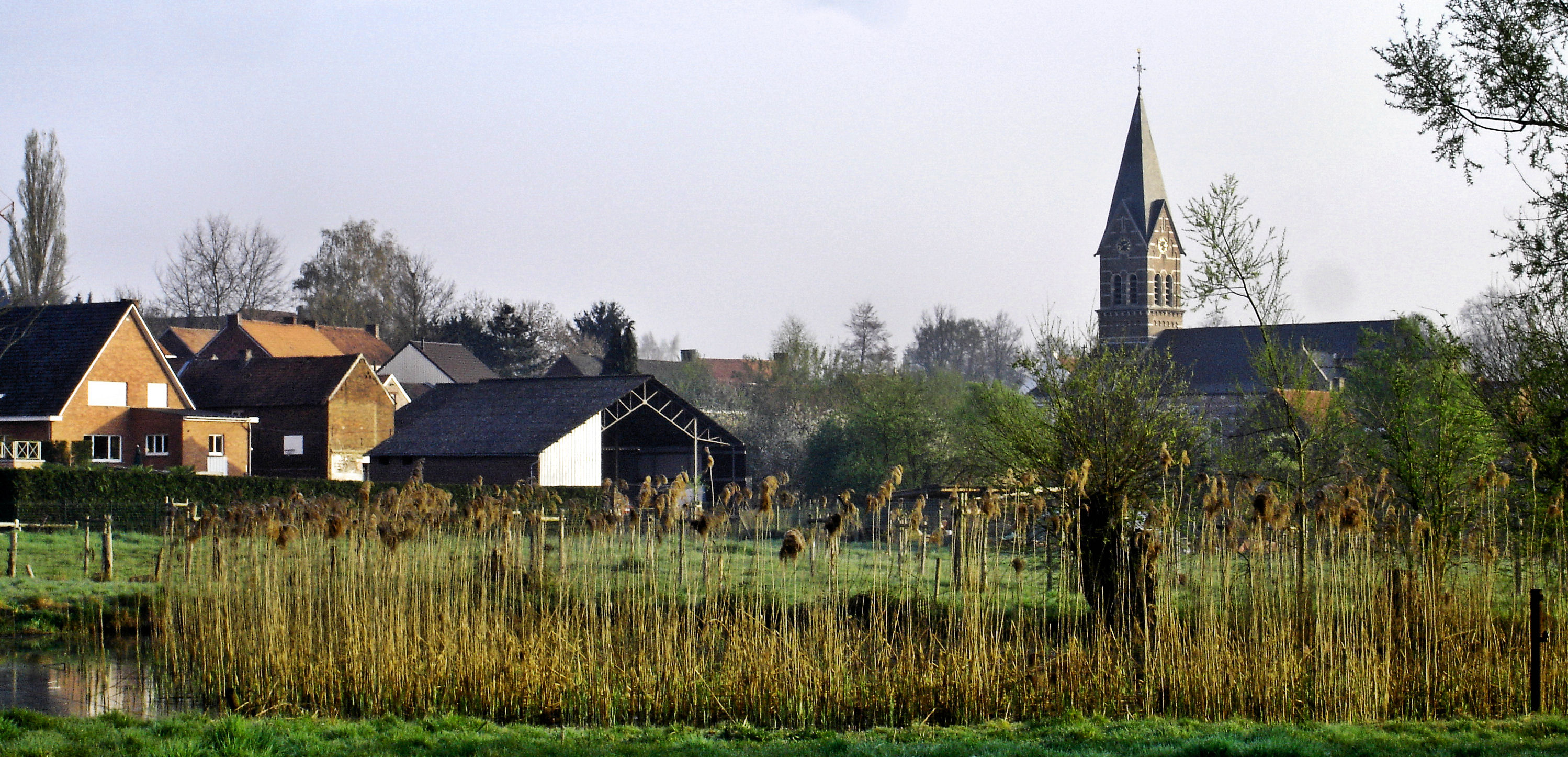
- Buildings along the footpath from Korbeek-Dijle to Heverlee
- Interactive map of Korbeek-Dijle
- Coordinates: 50°50′15″N 4°38′30″E
- Country: Belgium
- Province: Flemish Brabant
- Municipality: Bertem

Population (2006)
  - Total: 819
- Source: NIS
- Postal code: 3060
- Area code: 016
- Website: www.korbeek-dijle.net

Korbeek-Dijle is a village in the Belgian province Flemish Brabant and is part of the municipality of Bertem. Korbeek-Dijle is known because of its church, the Sint-Bartholomeuschurch (constructed in 1860). This church has been renovated in 1988–89.

Inside the church is a nice retable from 1522. It was created in a studio from Brussels and the side panels were painted by the artist Jan Vanden Couteren from Leuven. On these side panels you can find the history of the holy Stefanus, martyr. When the retable is closed, miraculous healings from the Middle Ages are visible.

The Ruwaal-walk, a signposted walk brings the views of the village and sunken lanes. This walk starts at the church.

== History ==
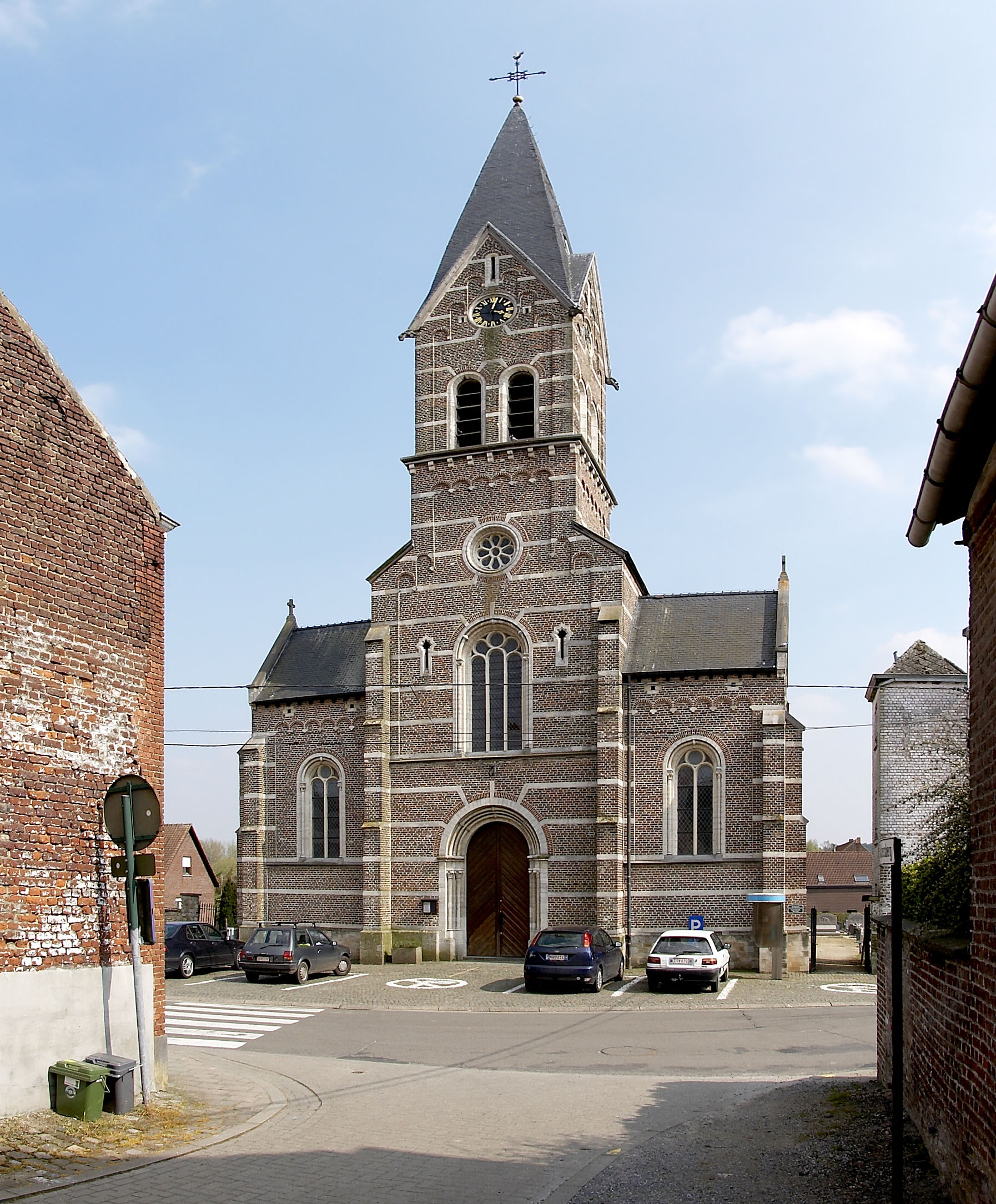
Korbeek-Dijle church

Under the Ancien Régime, Korbeek-Dijle was an independent lordship of the Oudaert family. After inheritance in 1661, Korbeek-Dijle was elevated to a barony in favor of Hendrick van Dongelberghe (died 1667). Legally, Korbeek-Dijle fell under the bailiwick of Herent, in the Leuven quarter of the Duchy of Brabant. After the French invasion, the village (then still referred to as Corbeek-over-Dyle) was classified as a municipality in the canton of Tervuren of the Dijle department. Korbeek retained its status as an independent municipality until 1977, when it merged with Bertem.
