= Acquarossa =

Acquarossa means red water and may refer to:

- Acquarossa, Italy, an ancient Etruscan settlement
- Acquarossa, Switzerland, the capital of the district of Blenio in the canton of Ticino
