= Sunken lane =

Road or track that is lower than the land on either side

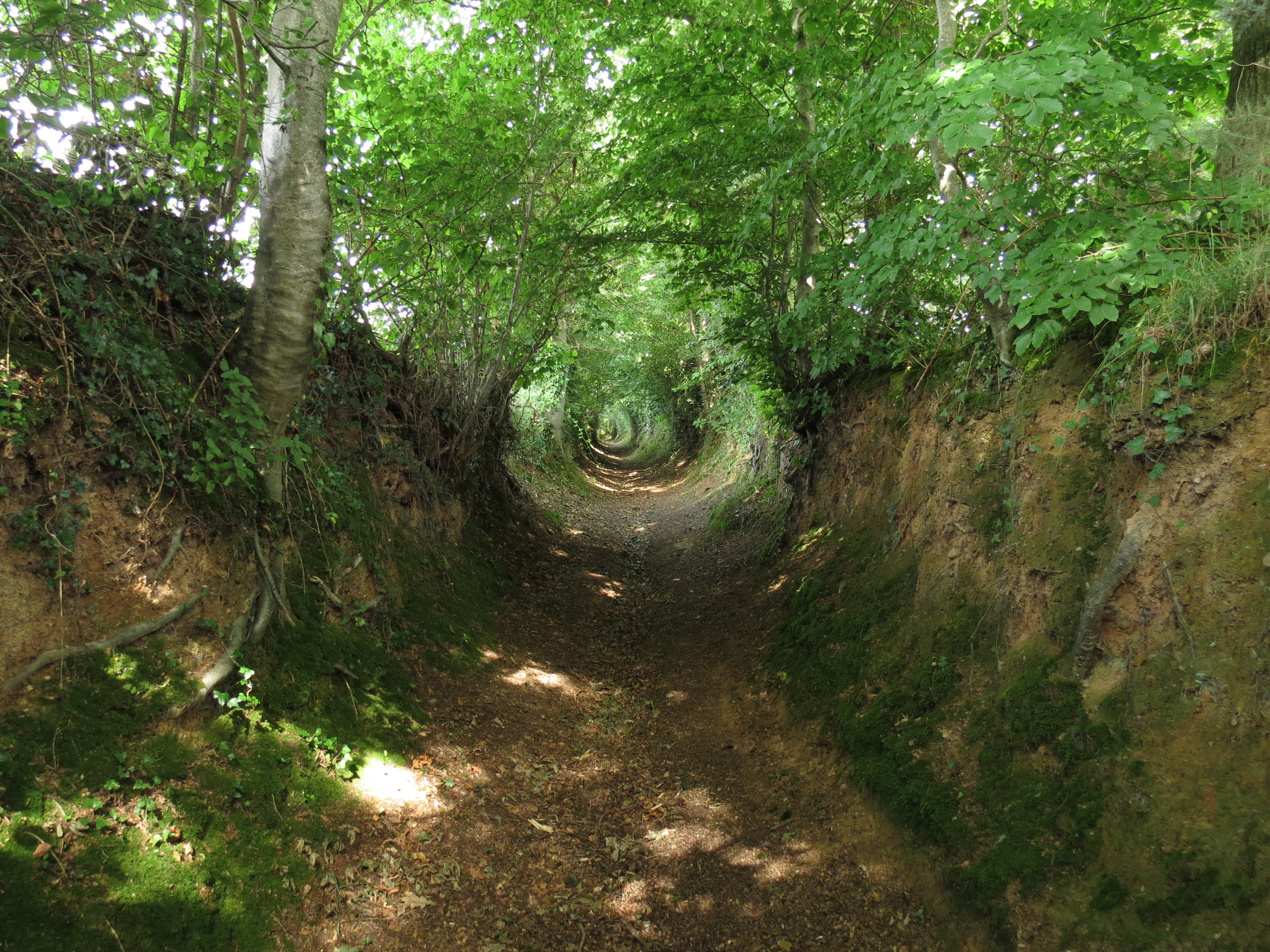
A hollow way (chemin creux) at La Meauffe, Manche, France

A sunken lane (also hollow way or holloway) is a road or track that is significantly lower than the land on either side, not formed by the (recent) engineering of a road cutting but possibly of much greater age.

Holloways may have been formed in various ways, including erosion by water or traffic; the digging of embankments to assist with the herding of livestock; and the digging of double banks to mark the boundaries of estates.

== Description ==
A holloway (Middle English: hol(g)h 'hollow' and weie) is a path or trail that is considerably below the level of the surrounding land. They are not natural features, they are the remains of human foot paths or animal routes that have been slowly carved into sunken lanes by countless footsteps over thousands of years. They are found throughout the world. Some holloways have been paved and are now used as roads. The ecologist, Andy Jeffries estimates that in England alone, there are over 1,000 miles of these sunken lanes. Through erosion the earthen walls tend to become wider at the lower portion of the trail than at the top, creating a partially enclosed structure and habitat that can support biodiversity of fauna and flora. Some are ornamented with carved patterns, symbols and graffiti on the rock walls.

== Means of formation ==
A variety of theories have been proposed for the origins of holloways. Different mechanisms may well apply in different cases.

=== Erosion ===
Some sunken lanes are created incrementally by erosion, by water and traffic. Some are ancient, with evidence of Roman or Iron Age origins, but others such as the Deep Hill Ruts in the old Oregon Trail at Guernsey, Wyoming, developed from 1841 to 1869.

Where ancient trackways have lapsed from use, the overgrown and shallow marks of hollow ways through forest may be the sole evidence of their former existence. On disused ridgeways in central Germany, the hollow ways often mark inclines.

The earth banks on either side, sometimes topped with hedges and trees, can give the impression of a tunnel enclosing the traveller. Because the roadway is restricted by the banks on either side, sunken lanes typically admit the passage of only one vehicle; that is, they are single-track roads. Occasional passing places may be provided, but a meeting of vehicles in a sunken lane often requires one party to reverse to a suitable passing place. In Central Germany, "dual carriageways" have been observed with two trenches side by side where a trackway was in such heavy use that it had lanes dedicated for each direction.

=== Embankments for cattle ===
Up to the present day, some writers have assumed that low banks were deliberately created with shovels as a means to hem in cattle, but there is no evidence for this, and in any case, banking only appears intermittently in certain types of soil. When metalled, sunken lanes are unlikely to erode further.

=== Double boundary banks ===
In The Making of the English Landscape, W. G. Hoskins explains the origin of some English holloways as a pair of matched earth banks marking the boundaries of two landowners' estates, as evidenced by the "two-fold ditch", twifealda dich, in a charter of c. 1174 describing the boundary between the abbot of Tavistock's land at Abbotsham, Devon and Richard Coffin's land at Alwington and Cockington. He gives another example, also from Devon, in a photograph of Armourwood Lane, Thorverton, which bounded the royal Silverton estate and the estate of Exeter abbey, most likely in the seventh century. Hoskins states that some such lanes are Celtic, some Saxon, some medieval.

== In other countries ==
=== Belgium ===
A sunken lane extending across the battlefield played an important role in the Battle of Waterloo in 1815, particularly in presenting an obstacle to the French cavalry. Victor Hugo dramatized this episode in Les Misérables.

=== France ===
Sunken lanes are common in the West of France, in the bocage landscape, especially around Lower Normandy, Brittany, and Anjou. The bocage landscape is historically famous for having been a particular feature of some conflicts, including the Chouannerie, or more recently the Battle of Normandy. The German army used sunken lanes to implement strong points and defenses to stop the American troops on the Cotentin peninsula and around the town of Saint-Lô.

One such lane, the Sunken Lane at Hawthorn Ridge west of Beaumont Hamel in northern France, is remembered as an assembly point for British troops, many of whom were filmed there on the first day on the Somme (1 July 1916) by Geoffrey Malins for the film The Battle of the Somme.

=== Germany ===
One of the largest networks of such routes in Germany is to be found in the municipalities of Alsheim and Mettenheim in Rhineland-Palatinate, where there they make up over 30 km of hiking trails. Some of these sunken lanes can be up to 5 metres deep.

=== Spain ===
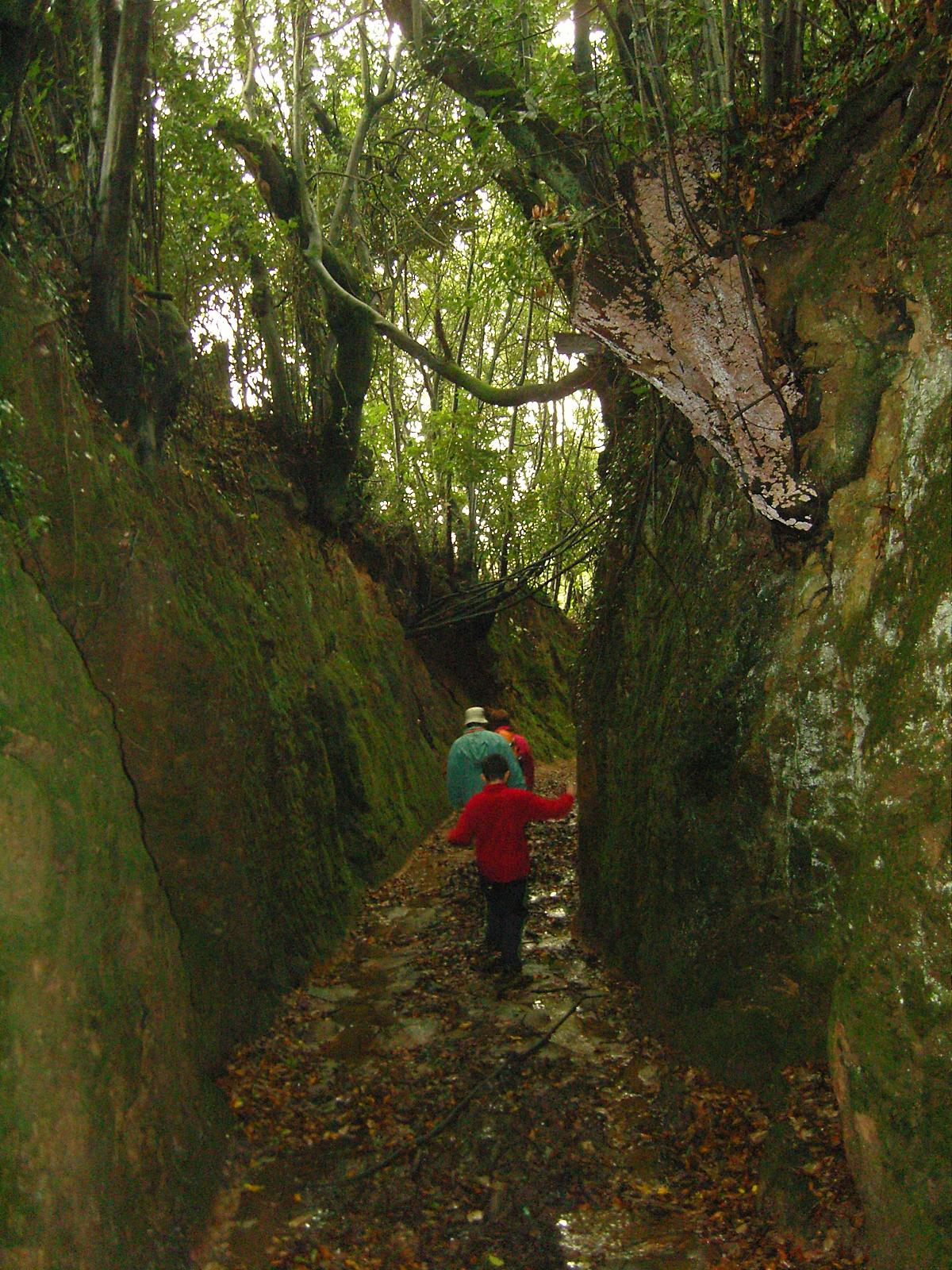
Congostra da Carballa, Ribeira, Galicia, Spain

In Galicia and western Asturias (both regions of northern Spain) the sunken lanes are usually called congostras or corredoiras, from Latin coangusta 'confined' and curro, currere 'run', being a common and characteristic feature of rural areas. Some lanes are now being recovered as hiking trails.

=== Syria ===
In Syria, faint traces of hollow ways attest to a dense network of tracks or paths connecting Bronze Age sites with each other and with their cultivation zones in the fourth and third millennia BC, and thousands of kilometres of such routes have been surveyed.

=== United Kingdom ===
Sunken lanes are a characteristic feature of the landscape of southern England, especially in the chalk areas of the North and South Downs, and greensand areas such as the Weald. The Surrey Hills AONB has many sunken lanes. Seal Hollow Road in Sevenoaks is a fine example of a sunken lane in southern England.

They are a particular feature of the West Country, in counties such as Dorset, and west Wales – areas unaffected by the land enclosures of mediaeval England. The English surname Holloway (hollow-way) derives from the Old English "hola weg", a sunken road.

While many sunken lanes are now metalled, some are still unsurfaced green lanes, typically now designated as either bridleways or byways.

A sunken road is a cross country equestrian obstacle.

Pictures of sunken lanes in the United Kingdom

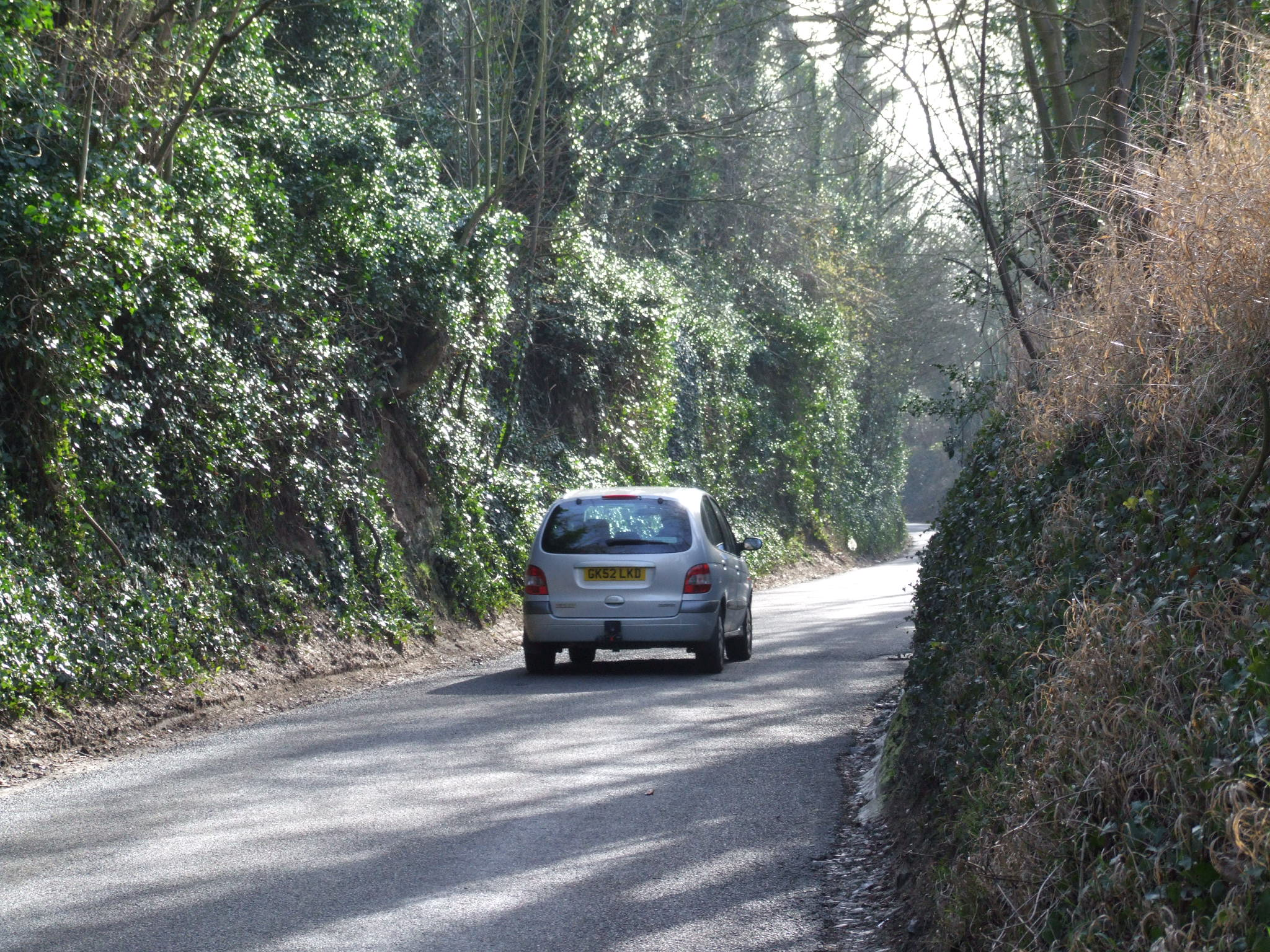
The aptly named Hollow Lane, Canterbury, UK, joins the city to the Roman road, Stone Street

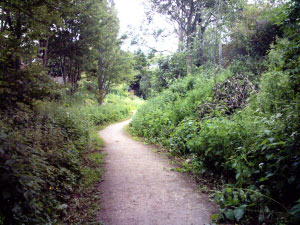
The old Roman road from Deva Victrix to Wilderspool, Newton Hollows, Cheshire

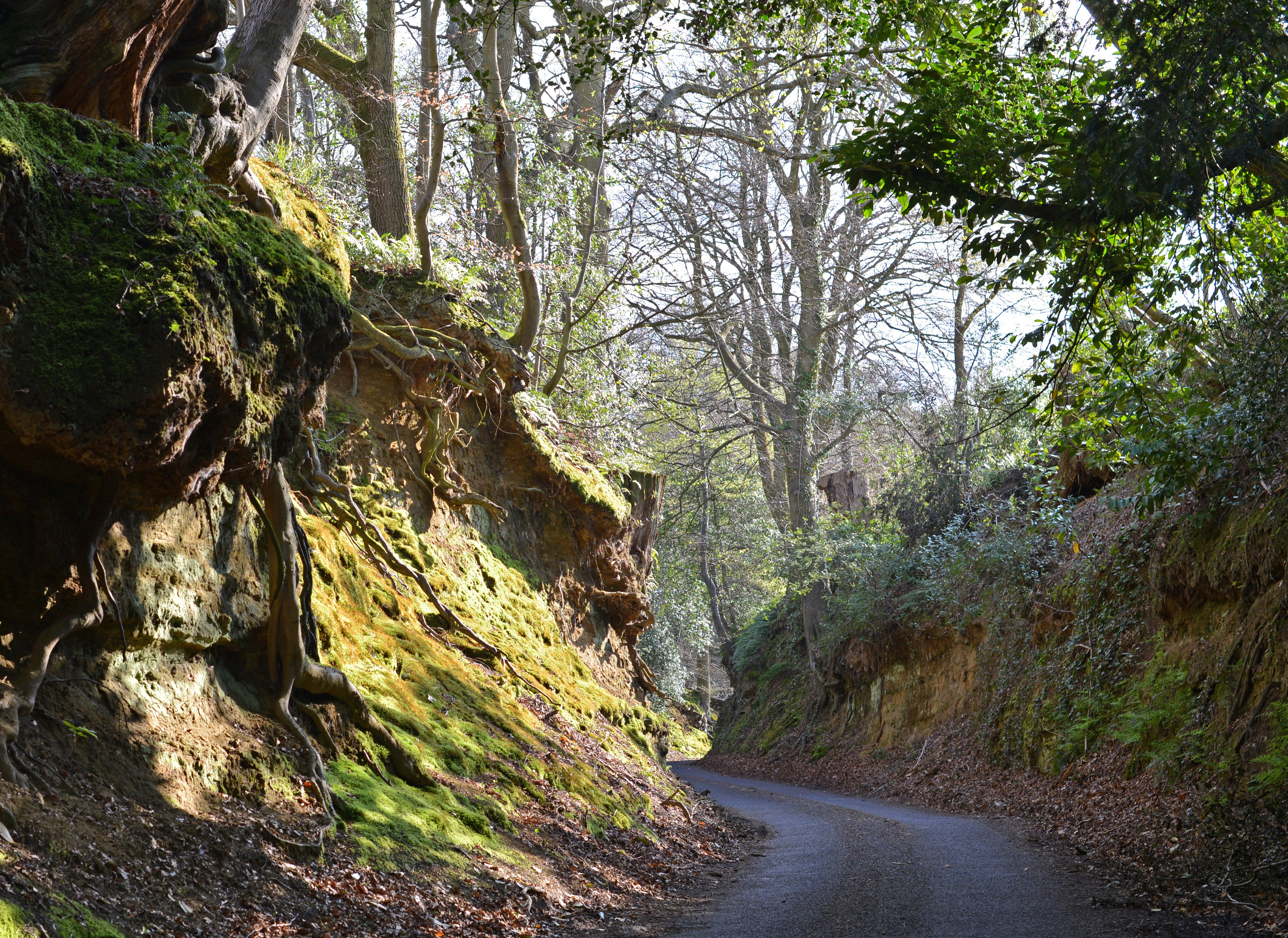
Church Lane, A sunken way in Witley, Surrey

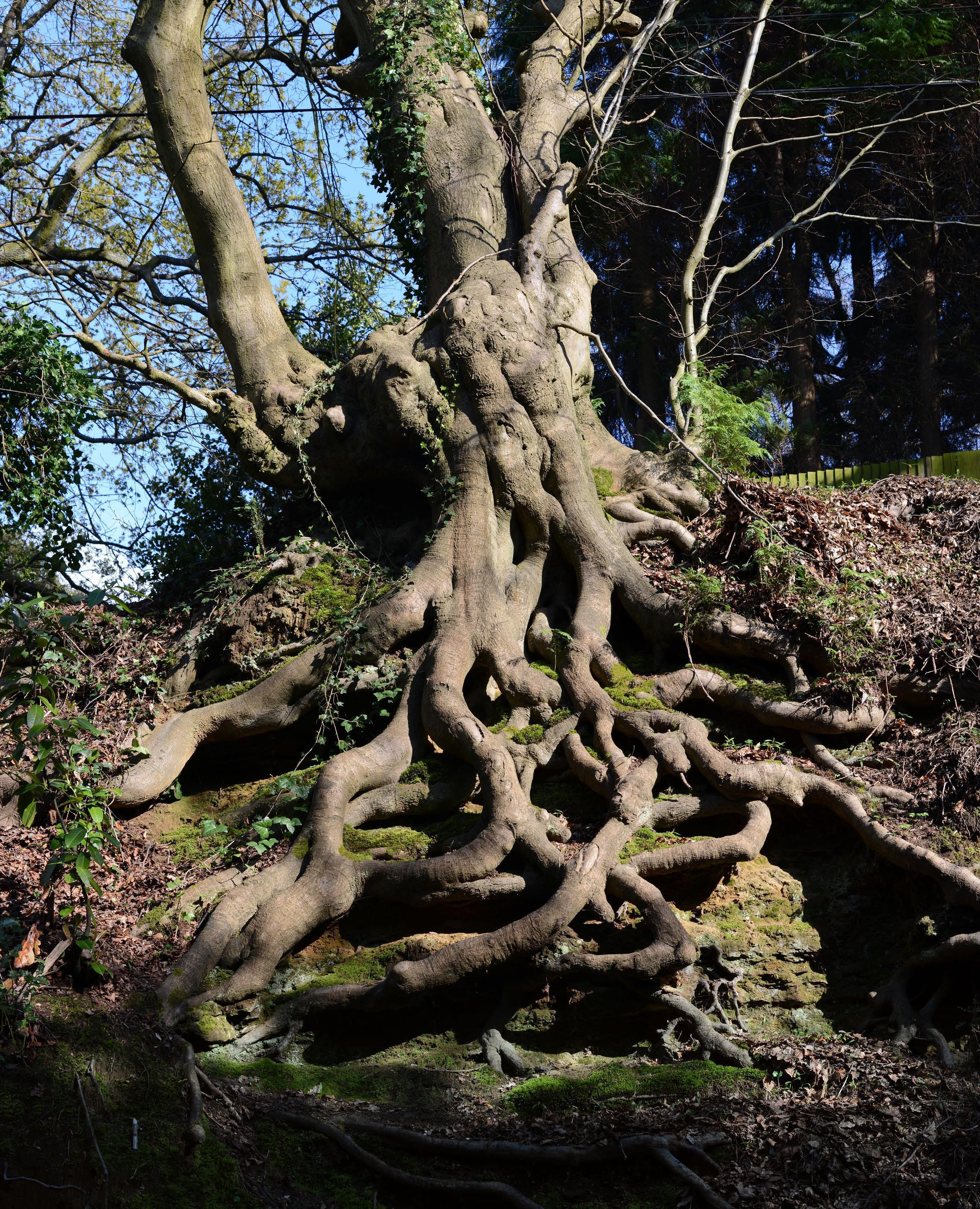
Exposed roots on the bank of Church Lane, a holloway, Witley, Surrey

=== United States ===
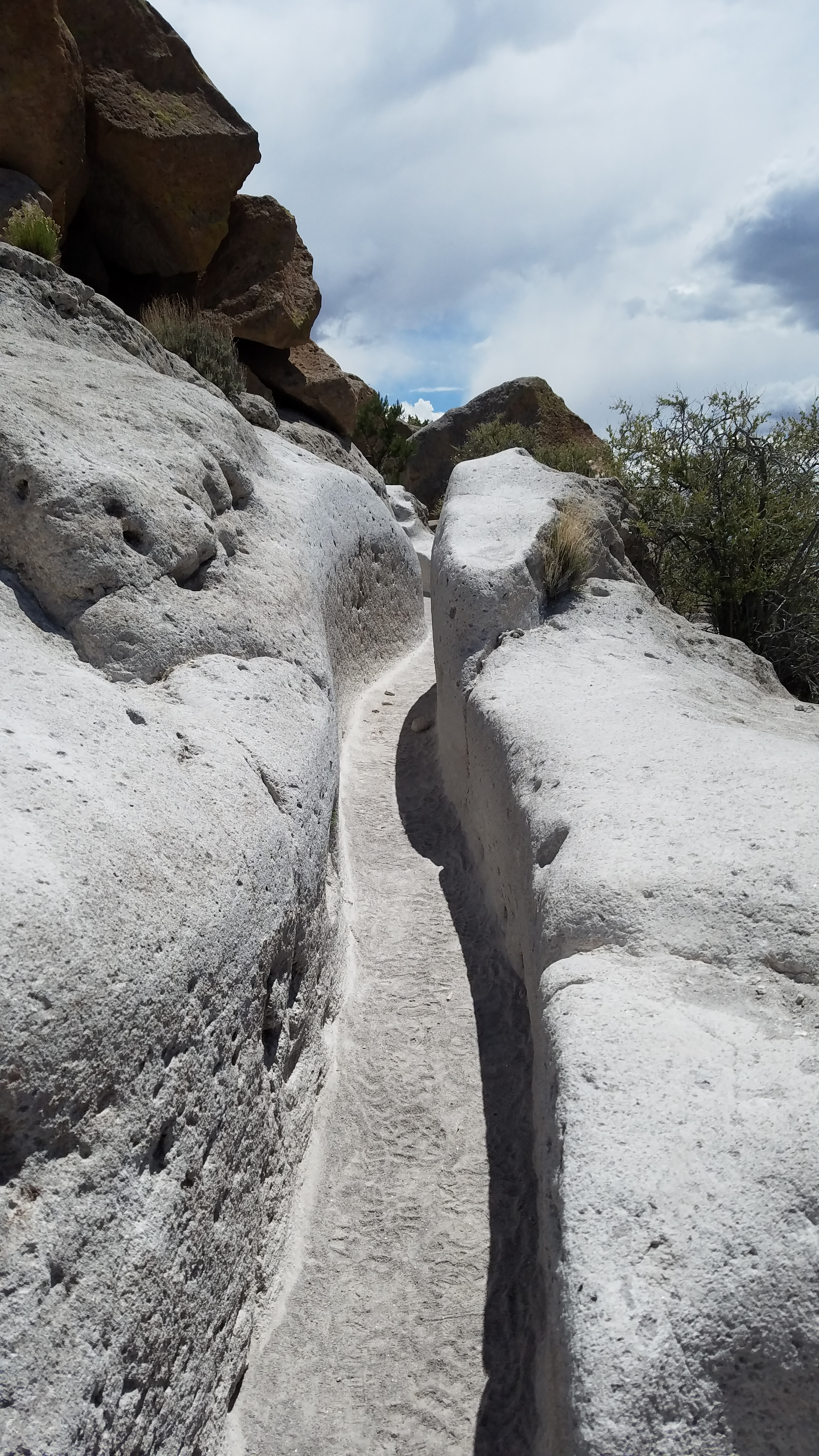
Tsankawi ancient sunken footpath

Tsankawi is a sunken footpath located in Bandelier National Monument, New Mexico; carved and worn into the rock by the Ancestral Pueblo people; 1.5 miles of the trail is considered an archaeological site. Because of the soft, volcanic tufa rock, and the climate of the region most of the path is barren and highly eroded. The sunken pathway, in its current eroded state, has been worn into the tufa rock at a depth of several feet in some places.

Sunken roads were also significant terrain features of the battlefields at Shiloh and Antietam in the American Civil War.

== See also ==
- Gully
- Tree tunnel
- Trench
- Via cava

== Bibliography ==
- Macfarlane, Robert; Richards, Dan; Donwood, Stanley (illustrator) (2013). Holloway. Faber and Faber.
