= Via cava =

Coordinates: 42°39′N 11°39′E

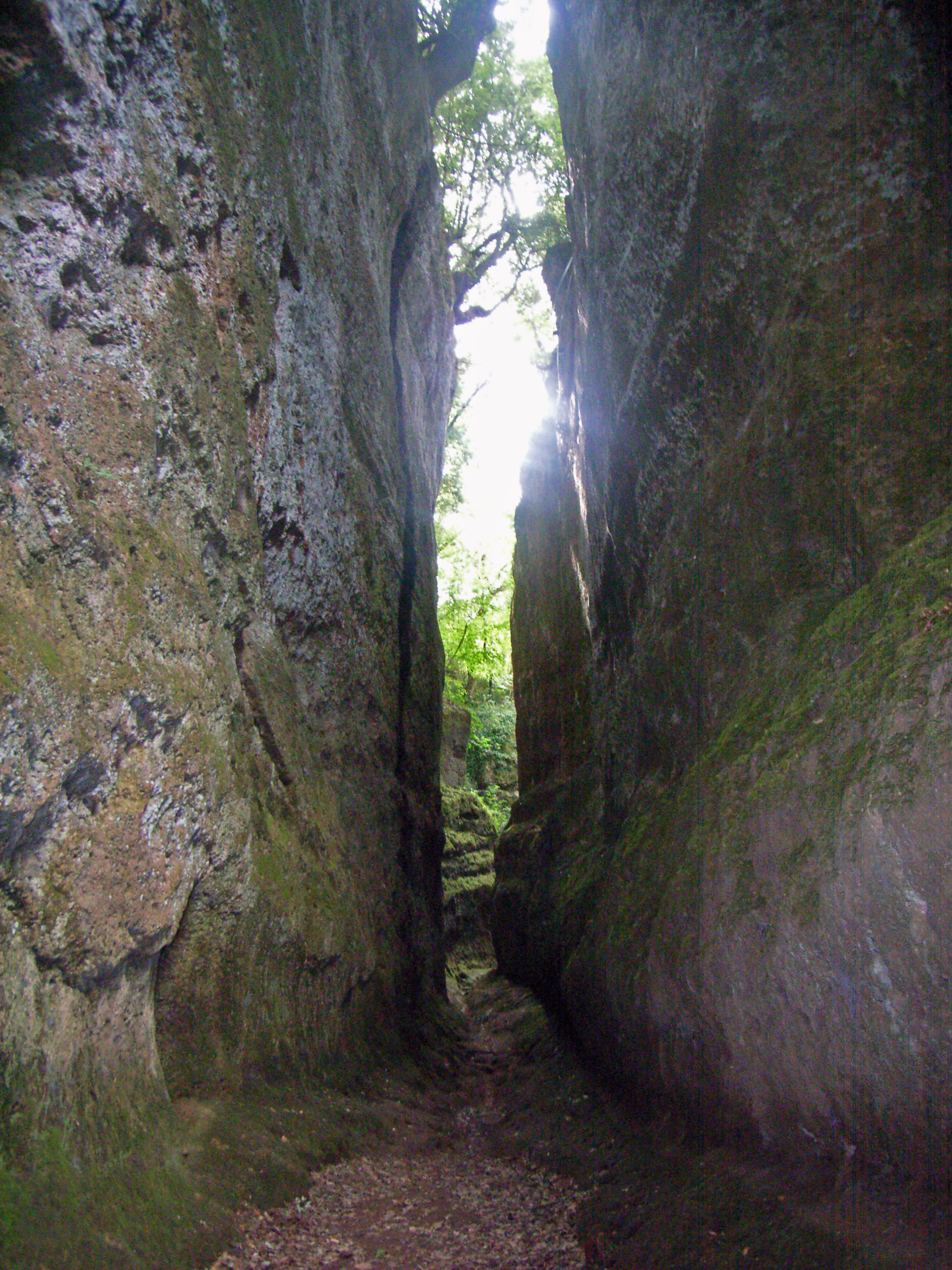
Excavated road of Etruscan age in the Necropolis of Sovana

The Vie Cave (in English excavated roads), also known in Italian as Cavoni, is a road network in southern Europe, found in Spain, Italy, Turkey and as far east as Jordan. In Italy they partly link an Etruscan necropolis and several settlements in the area between Sovana, Sorano and Pitigliano. They consist mainly of trenches of variable width and length, excavated as nearly vertical cliffs in different types of bedrock, sometimes over sixty feet high, possibly serving as a defense system against invaders, wild animals or forces of nature. Although often dated as being carved by pre-Roman civilisations in the first or second millennium BC, the builders and purpose of the road system are largely unclear, and there are indications that they are much older than assumed.

In Italy they are sometimes narrow, sometimes wider cuttings often running deeply through hills and bedrock, and are thought to have changed little since Etruscan times. Their construction is said to have resulted from the wearing through soft tuff but also harder bedrock by iron-rimmed wheels, creating deep ruts that required the road to be frequently recut to a smooth surface. Their dating is mainly deduced from the settlements they pass between, and objects from tombs beside them. This dating is deemed uncertain by those pointing out the extent of petrifaction of the so-called cart ruts.

In Roman times segments of the Vie Cave became part of a road system that was connected to the main trunk of the Via Clodia, an ancient road linking Rome and Manciano, through the city of Tuscania, which branched off from the Cassia road in Lazio territory. Wider segments are even included in the modern road system.

== Vie Cave of Sovana ==
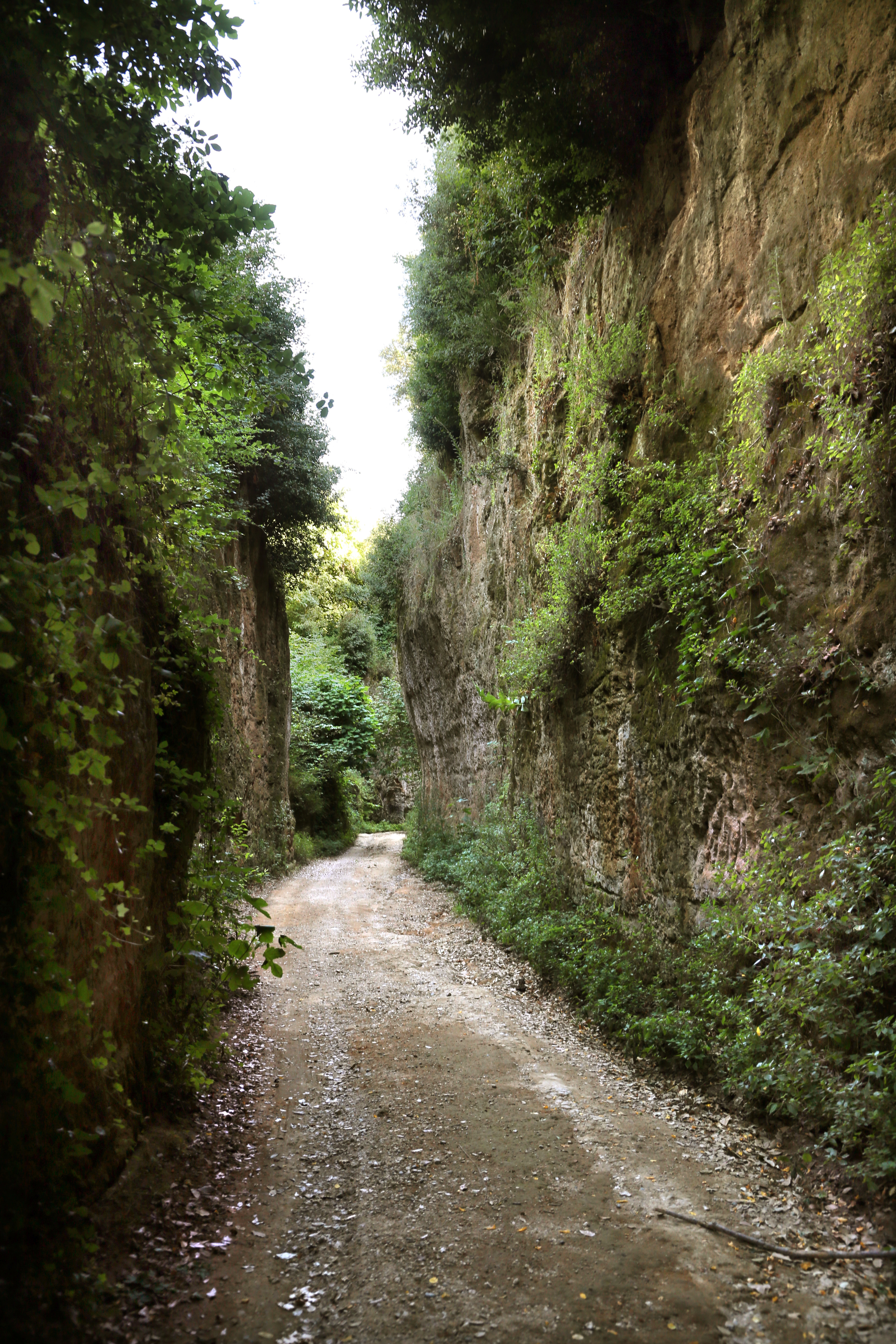
Via Cava in Pitigliano

Around Sovana, the Vie Cave wind around and towards the archaeological area of that town, then reconnecting with those from Sorano and Pitigliano.

== Vie Cave in Sorano ==
Around Sorano the Vie Cave begin coming out of the Porta dei Merli, and descending into the valley of the river Lente.

The Via Cava (singular for Vie Cave) of San Rocco was on the opposite side of the Sorano county, along the ruins of the church of San Rocco, religious building of the romanesque art that retains parts of the original wall of the via. Behind the ruins of the church there is a vast Etruscan necropolis with tombs hewn into the tuff.

Near Poggio San Rocco and Poggio Croce there are also numerous Etruscan tombs and a columbarium, which are as rock-cut cells arranged in several rows one above the other. From Middle Ages on these ancient tombs became a shelter for pigeons.

== Vie Cave of Pitigliano ==
Around Pitigliano there are several Vie Cave, including the one directed towards the archaeological area of Sovana.
