= Acquarossa, Italy =

Coordinates: 42°29′N 12°08′E

Acquarossa
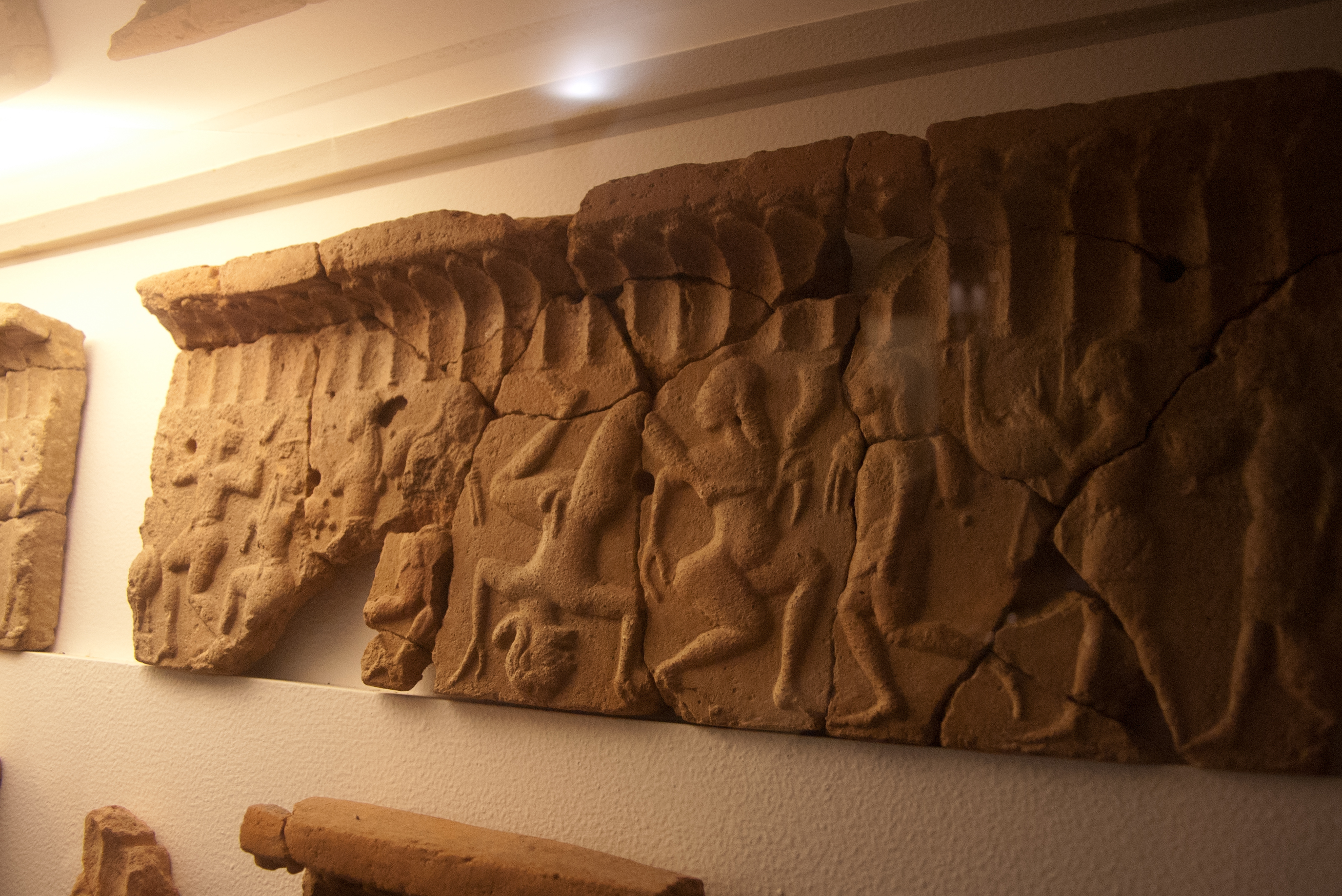
- Architectural terracotta from Acquarossa

- Location within Lazio
- Type: Settlement
- Periods: Archaic
- Cultures: Etruscan
- Location: Comune di Viterbo, Lazio, Italy
- Region: Lazio

Site notes
- Excavation dates: 1960s-1970s
- Archaeologists: Istituto Svedese di Studi Classici a Roma

Acquarossa or Fosso Acqua Rossa is the modern name of the location of an ancient Etruscan settlement abandoned or destroyed in the second half of the sixth century BC. Located near Viterbo, in Etruria, was excavated by the Swedish Institute at Rome in the 1960s and 1970s. An elite complex similar to the Regia in Rome was excavated at the site.
