= Mount Obruchev =

Mountain in Oates Land, Antarctica

Mount Obruchev (68°54′S 154°10′E) is a mountain 15 nautical miles (28 km) east-southeast of Scar Bluffs, near the base of Mawson Peninsula. Mapped by the Soviet Antarctic Expedition, 1958, and named for Soviet geologist Vladimir Obruchev.
