= Cape Freshfield =

Peninsula of Antarctica

Cape Freshfield (68°20′S 151°0′E) is an ice-covered cape between Deakin Bay and the Cook Ice Shelf, Antarctica. The coastline in this vicinity was first roughly charted by the United States Exploring Expedition (1838–42) under Lieutenant Charles Wilkes, and for a period this cape was thought to be Wilkes' Cape Hudson. The cape was mapped in 1912 by the Far Eastern Party of the Australasian Antarctic Expedition under Douglas Mawson, who named it for Douglas Freshfield, a long-time member of the Council of the Royal Geographical Society, and one time president of that organization.
