= Sint-Agatha-Rode =

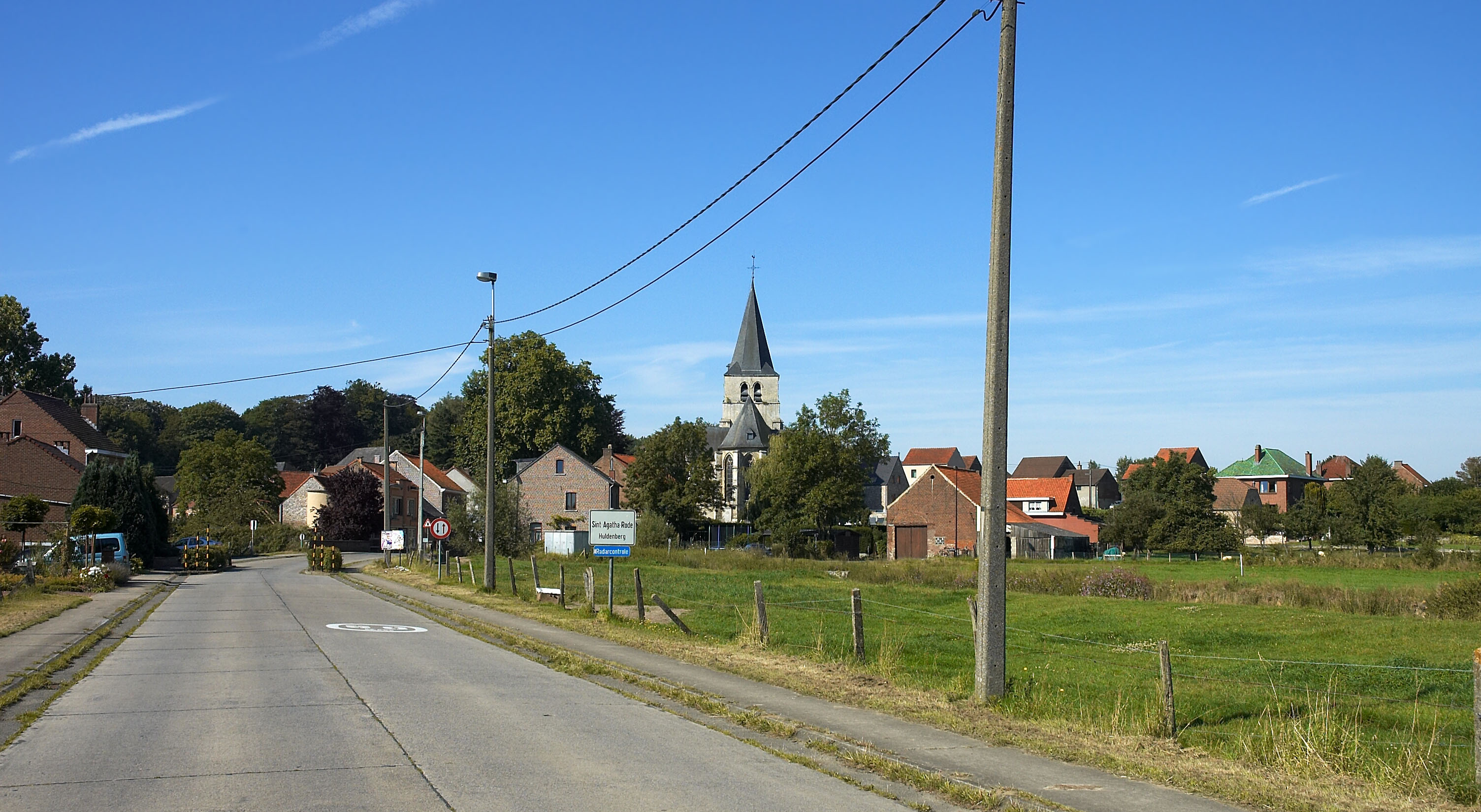

- Location in Belgium
- Coordinates: 50°47.2′N 04°38′E
- Country: Belgium
- Region: Flemish Region
- Community: Flemish Community
- Province: Flemish Brabant
- Municipality: Huldenberg

Area
  - Total: 7.23 km^{2} (2.79 sq mi)

Population (1 January 2006)
  - Total: 1,532
  - Density: 212/km^{2} (549/sq mi)
- Postal codes: 3040
- Area codes: 016
- Website: www.huldenberg.be
- Location of Huldenberg in Flemish Brabant

Sint-Agatha-Rode, named after the third-century Christian martyr Saint Agatha of Sicily, is a Dutch-speaking village in Belgian province of Flemish Brabant and lies within the district of the town of Huldenberg. (Note: After the Battle of Wavre in 1815 the Prussian general Thielemann located his headquarters here, and in contemporary English accounts and some modern ones it is often spelt St Achtenrode.) Historically Sint-Agatha-Rode was an independent municipality (Gemeente) until the merger of Belgian municipalities in 1977 when it was joined to the town of Huldenberg.

Sint-Agatha-Rode is located east of the town centre of Huldenberg, in the hills between the valleys of the river Dijle which is the eastern boundary of the Huldenberg district and the river Laan which is the western boundary. North of the town center of Sint Agatha-Rode the Laan joins the Dyle. The eastern boundary of the village is the language barrier with the Walloon villages of Nethen and Pecrot and to the south is the Flemish village of Ottenburg. Sint-Agatha-Rode has developed from being an agricultural village to become a rural residential town.

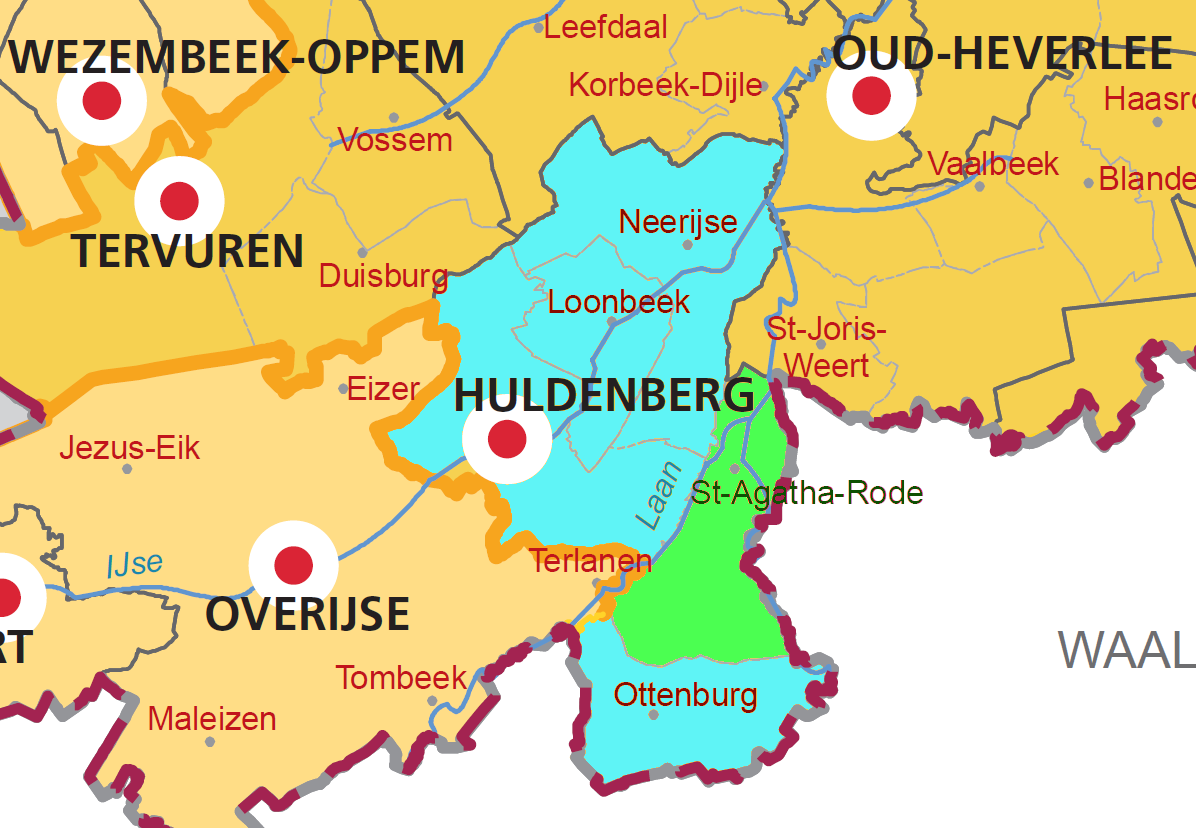
Situation of Sint-Agatha-Rode (green) as a part of the greater Huldenberg municipality (blue).

== Attractions ==
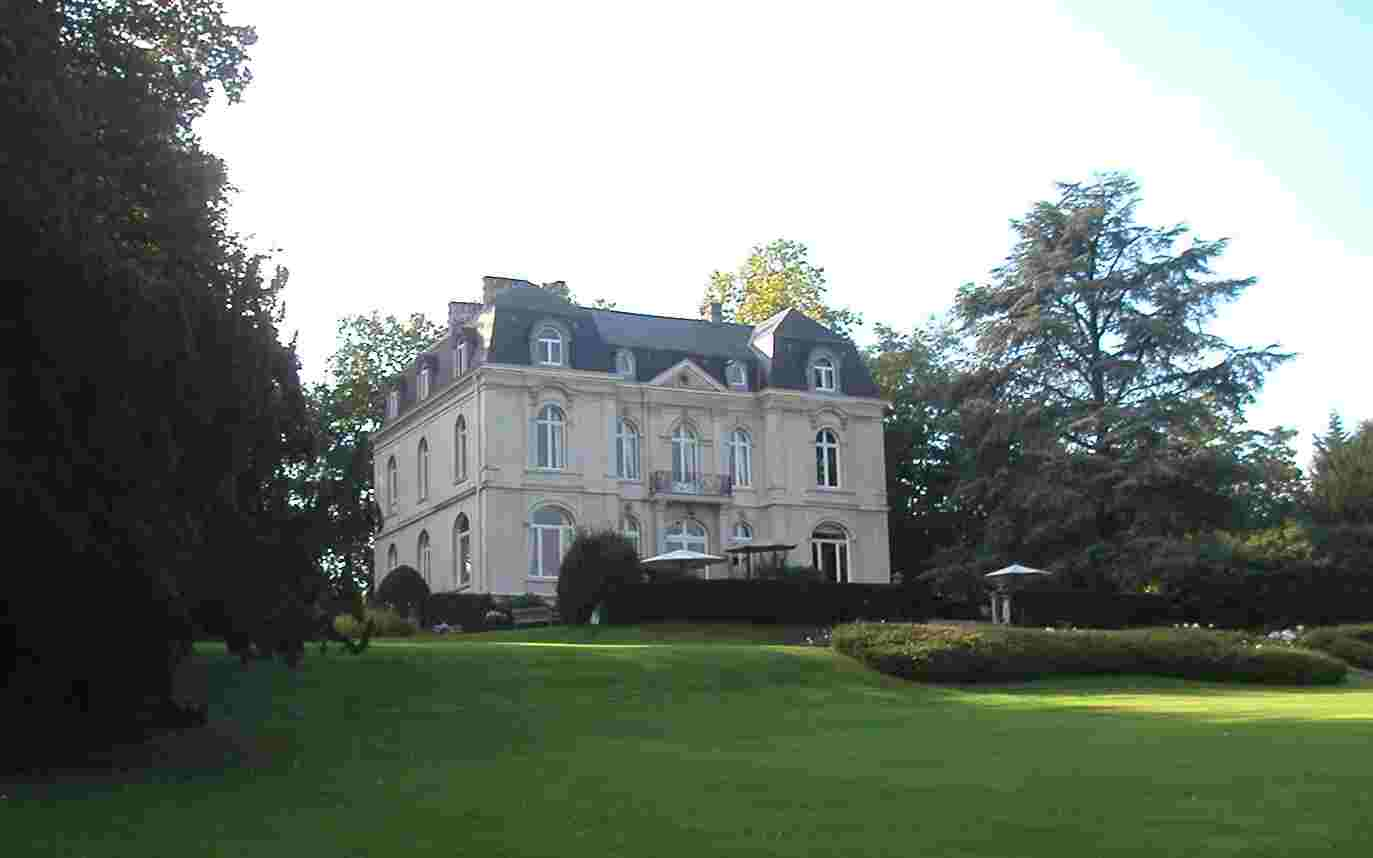
The New Chateau of Sint Agatha Rode

- The village of St. Agatha-Rode was designated a protected village (beschermd dorpsgezicht) in 1979.
- The Gothic Church of Saint Agatha was founded in the 13th century. It has been rebuilt many times – in 1578, for example, it was burnt by religious extremists. The present building was rebuilt and restored in the early 17th century and is made from white Gobertange stone. The church tower is also in early Gothic style with a chiming clock built by the Namur clockmaker Lion in 1738 and which was restored in 1993. Many of the stained glass windows were blown out when the nearby Dijle bridge was blown up during the Second World War and were replaced about 1950. The church and the cemetery wall were designated as protected buildings in 1979.

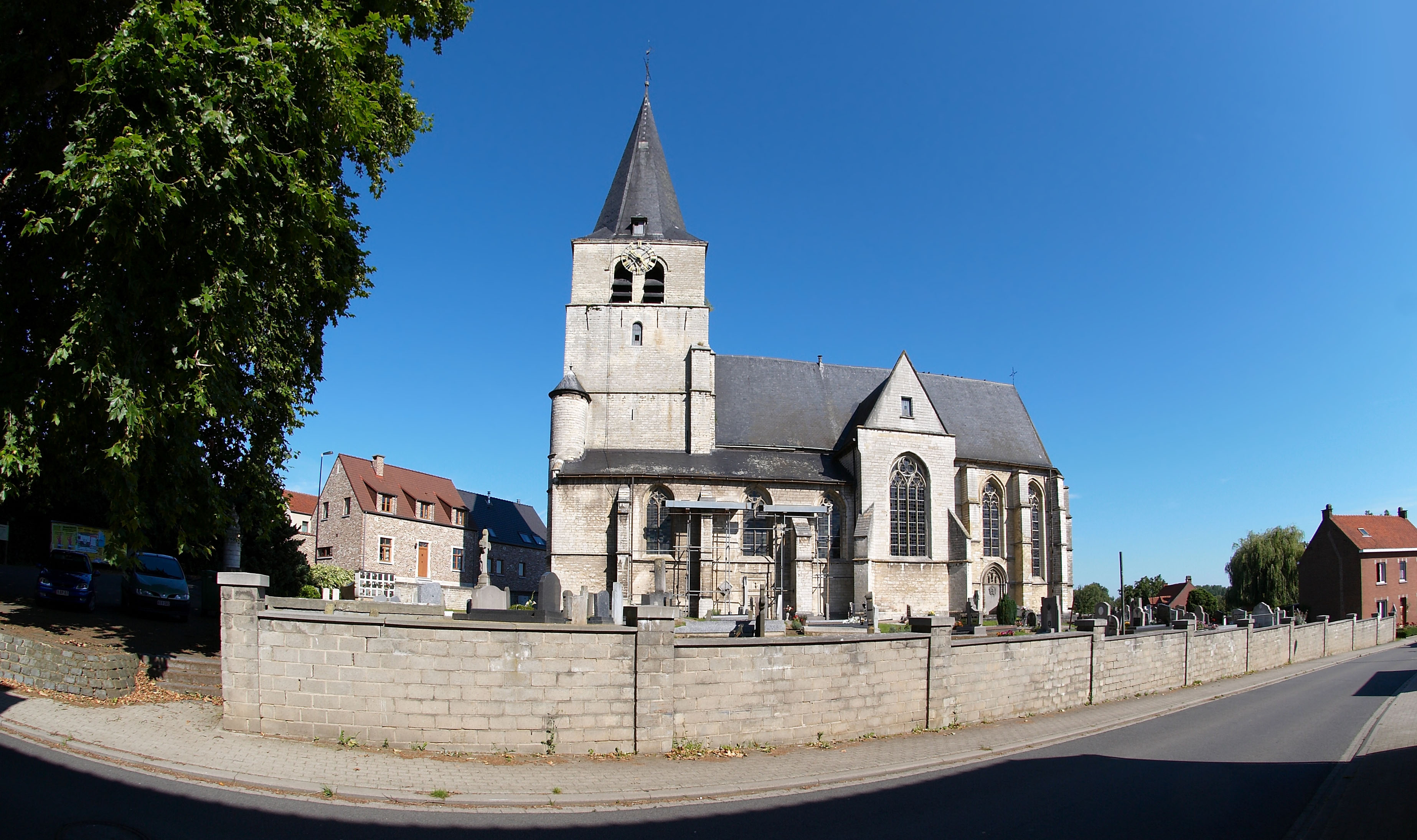
The St. Agatha Church

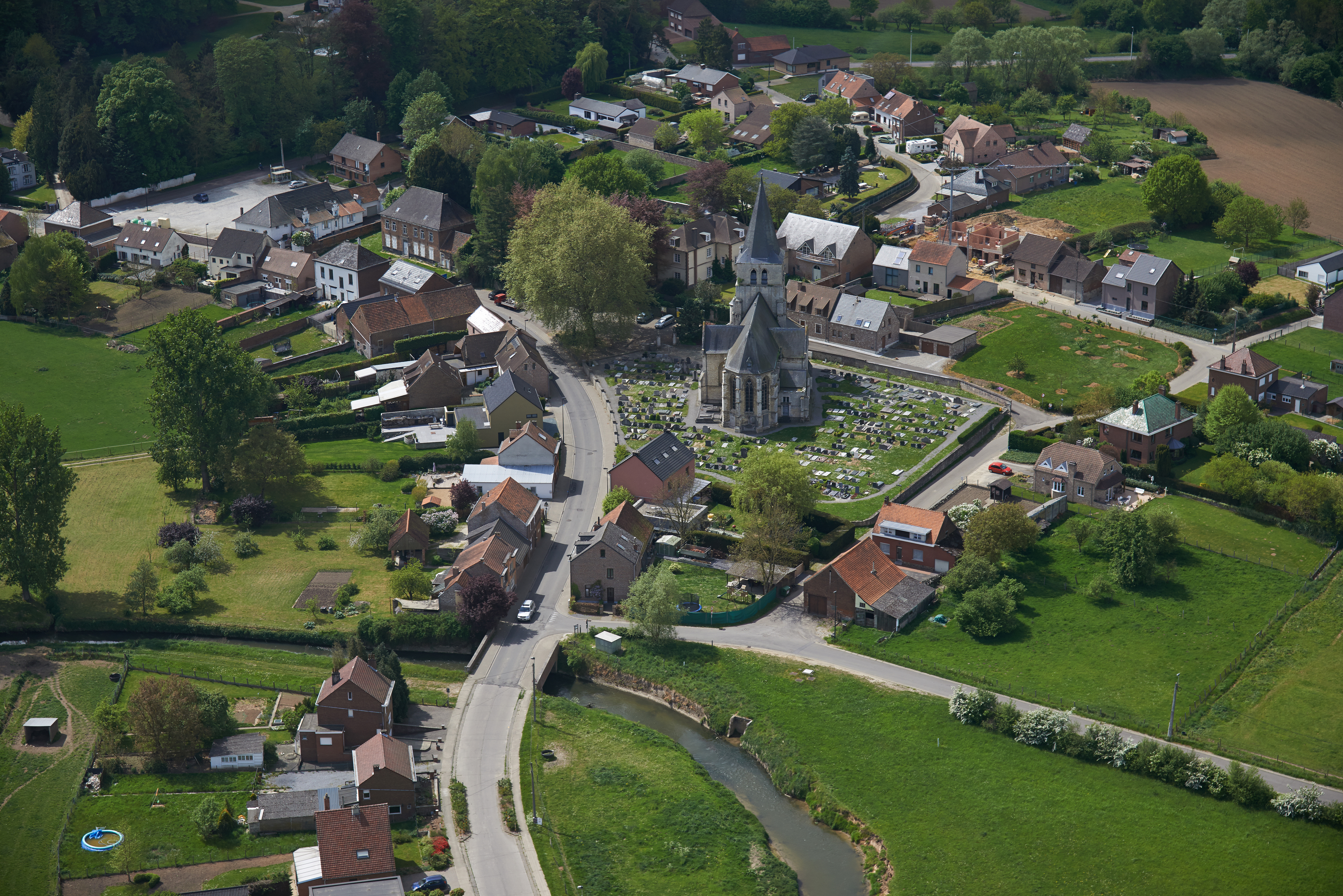
Aerial view of the area round the church of Sint-Agatha-Rode

- In front of the church there is a plane tree that was planted at the time of the Belgian independence in 1830 is called the Liberty Tree (Vrijheidsboom). The tree was also designated as a protected monument in 1979.
- The parsonage (pastorie) dates from the late 18th century and was designated as a protected monument in 1993.
- The estates of the Hinnemeure and Celongae farms in Neerijse were designated as protected areas (beschermd dorpsgezicht) in 1996. Part of these estates lie within the territory of Sint-Agatha-Rode.
- There are two châteaus in village. The date of construction of the old château is unknown but Maximilien-Emmanuel d’Overschie Baron of Neerijse owned it in the 18th century. When it was restored in 1788 the château had a classical U-shape a courtyard with French gardens, horse stables and accommodation for staff. The new château of Sint Agatha Rode was built in 1909 on the same estate as the old château. The new château was designed in eclectic style by the Pierard brothers from Charleroi and the walls were made of reinforced concrete.

== Scenery ==
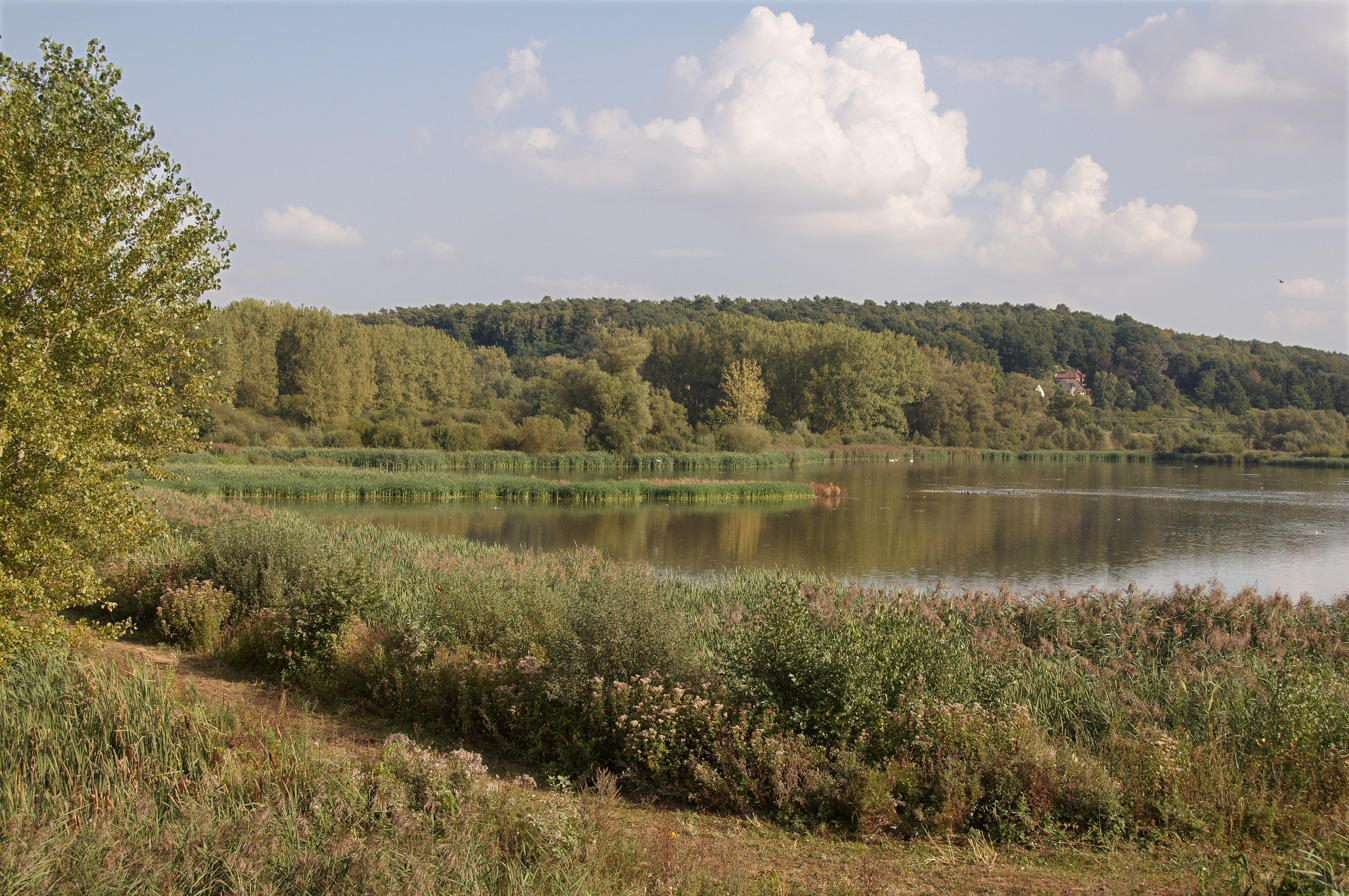
The Grootbroek nature reserve

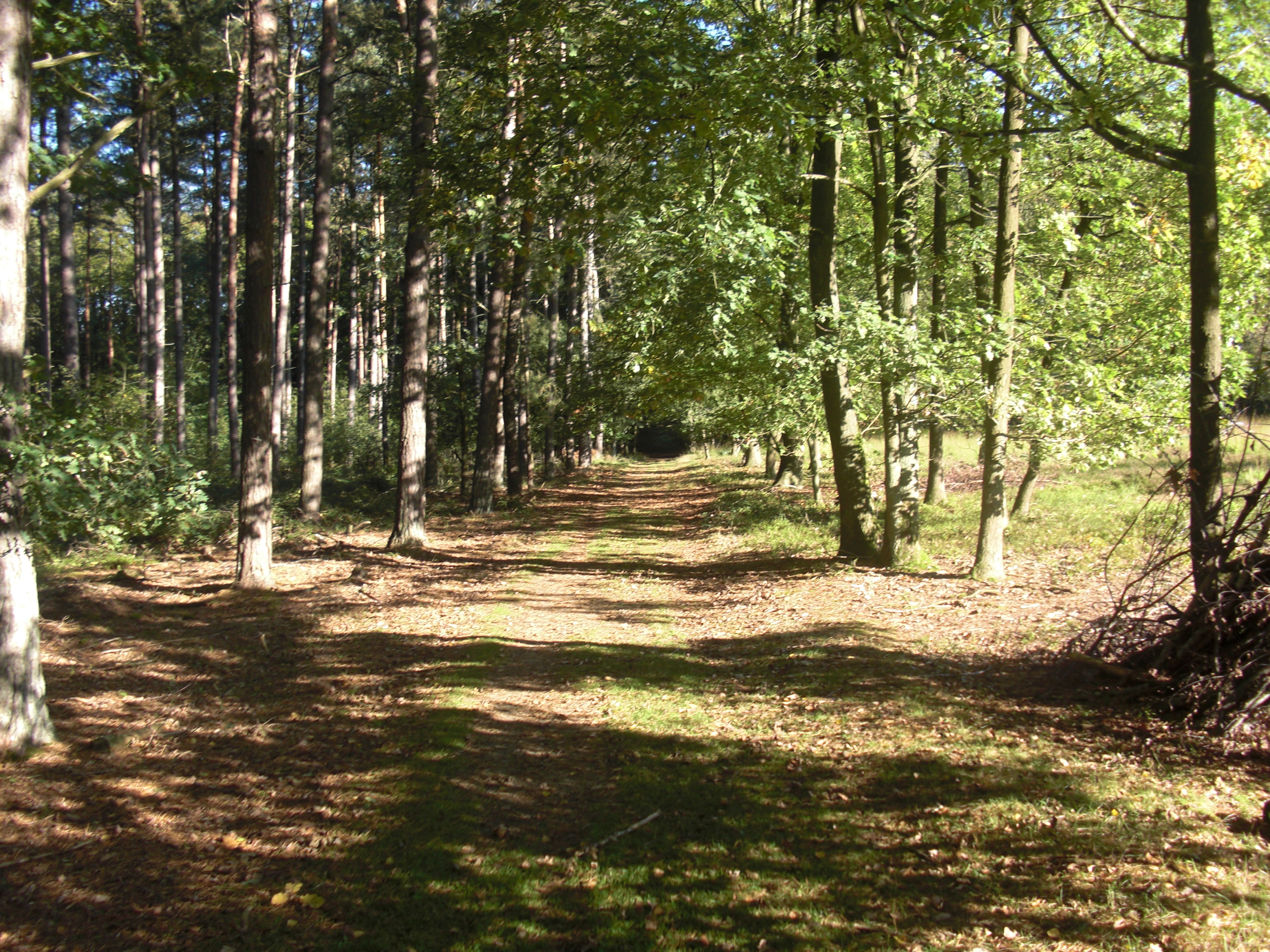
The Rodebos nature reserve

- The Grootbroek is a 30 hectare low-lying wetlands nature reserve in the Dyle valley. The Groetbroek lake is shallow and used by waders, herons, and egrets particularly in the Spring and Autumn migration periods. These and other birds can be viewed from a wooden observation building overlooking the lake. This hide contains detailed information on the wildlife in the reserve. The Groetbroek was designated a protected area (landschap) in 1978.
- A nature reserve called the Rodebos (red wood) is situated on the side of the valley of the Laan river. It has an area of 150 hectares. This area is home to many kinds of bats - in particular Daubenton's Bat which feeds at night on flies, midges and water bugs.

== History ==
- Remnants of prehistoric ice-age people (fire bricks, shards and blades) have been found in Sint-Agatha-Rode where the Laan and Dijle rivers merge.
- Sint-Agatha-Rode lies near the former major Roman road between Gembloux and Mechelen. A spur from this road ran through Sint-Agatha-Rode along a street now called Oude Waversebaan. The remains of a Gallo-Roman villa and fragments of Roman pottery were found in 1907 in the North-East of present-day Rodebos park near the Oude Waversebaan in Sint-Agatha-Rode. This villa was destroyed about 276 when the invading Franks from the East occupied the area.
- In the 11th century, the Counts of Leuven cut down the forests in the area and built a chapel to Saint Agatha, from which the name of the village is taken. ("Rode" means a clearing in a wood or forest in English). The Counts also built a castle beside the Dijle river which was, for a time, the residence of Sophie of Thuringia, Duchess of Brabant, widow of Henry II, Duke of Brabant, in the 13th century.

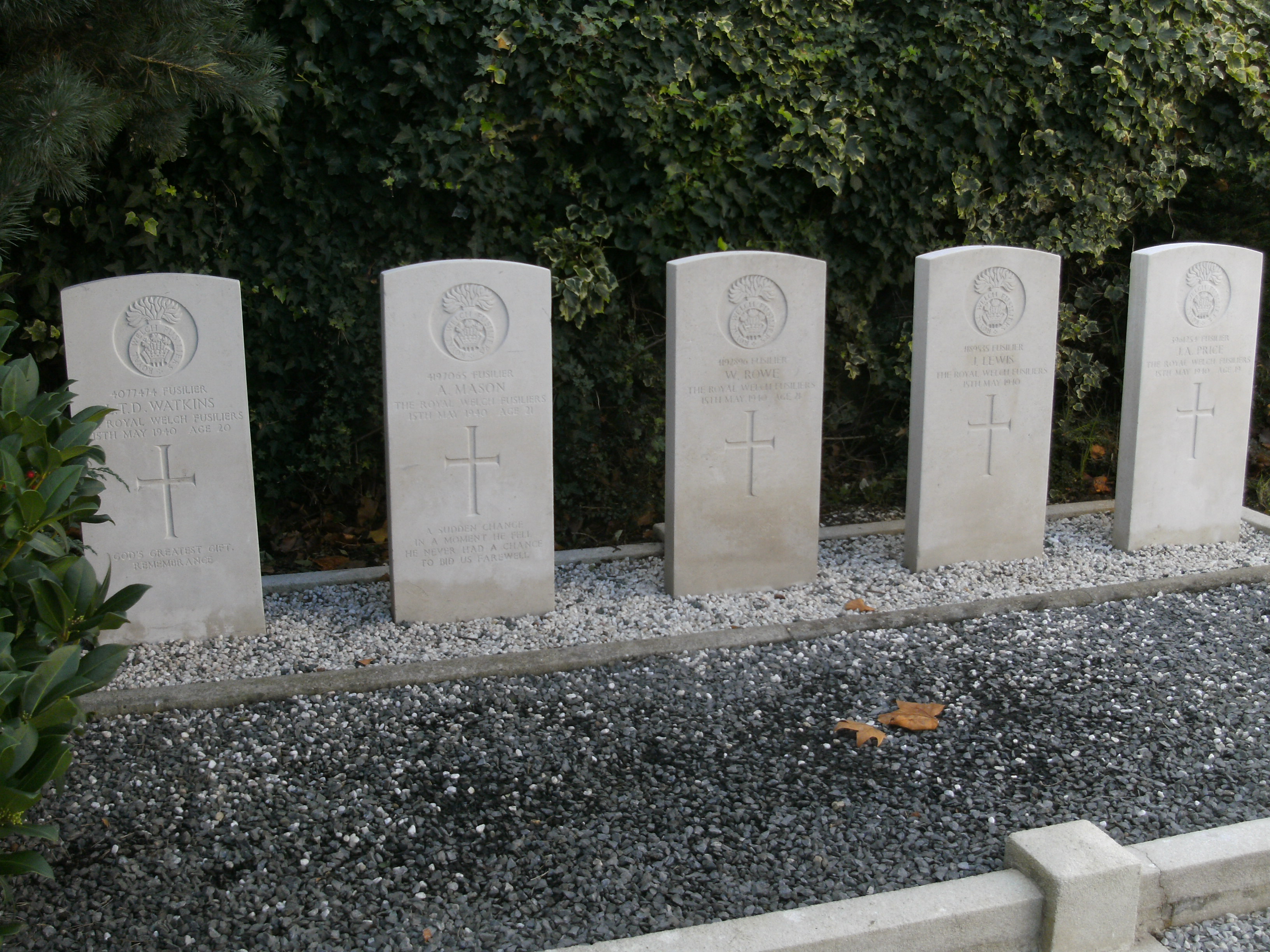
Graves of British soldiers in churchyard

- There are five graves of British soldiers from the Royal Welch Fusiliers in the graveyard of the church in Sint Agatha Rode. They died on 15 May 1940. The Royal Welch Fusilers Regimemental Museum includes the following description of the action as part of the Dyle Plan: "The 1st Battalion The Royal Welch Fusiliers first made contact with the Germans on 14 May 1940 on the River Dyle at Ottenburg, north of Wavre and some 20 km south-east of Brussels. The forward company was subjected to intense mortar fire and a series of unsuccessful attacks throughout the following day. Meanwhile the Germans had broken through near Sedan, threatening the southern flank of the British Expeditionary Force (B.E.F.), and orders for the Battalion to withdraw came on the night of 15–16 May."
