= Cook Ice Shelf =

Ice shelf in Antarctica

Coordinates: 68°40′S 152°30′E

Location in Antarctica

Cook Ice Shelf is an ice shelf about 55 miles (90 km) wide, occupying a deep recession of the coastline between Cape Freshfield and Cape Hudson, to the east of Deakin Bay.

This bay was discovered by the US Exploring Expedition in 1840, and referred to by Wilkes as Disappointment Bay. This indentation was called Cook Bay by the Australasian Antarctic Expedition, 1911–14, under Douglas Mawson, who named it for Joseph Cook, Prime Minister of Australia in 1914. The generic term has been amended, as the bay is permanently filled by an ice shelf.

Scientists studying the effects of global warming have proposed that sea water encroachment in the area could destabilize a significant portion of the East Antarctic Ice Sheet.
