= Cook Bay =

Cook Bay is the name of three bays:

- Cook Bay (South Georgia), in the subantarctic island of South Georgia
- Cook Bay (Antarctica), on the George V Coast
- Cook Bay (Tierra del Fuego), south of Tierra del Fuego

== See also ==
- Cook's Bay (disambiguation)
