= Paul Splingaerd =

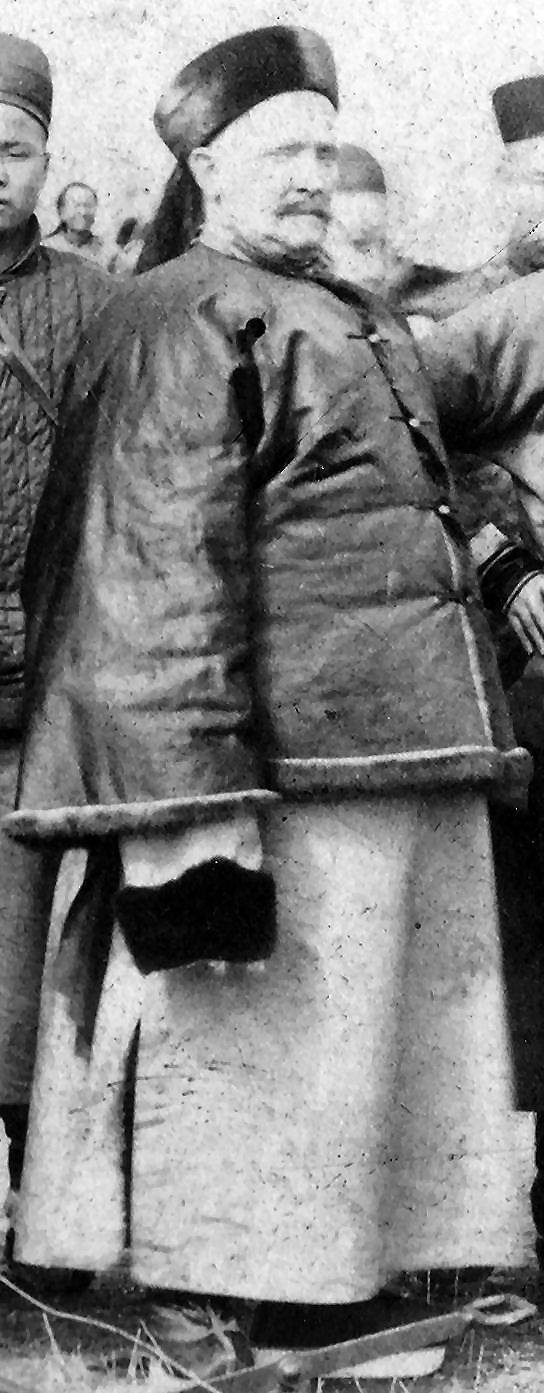
- Born: 1842; Brussels
- Died: 1906; Xi'an
- Other names: Lin Fuchen (林輔臣)

Paul Splingaerd (1842 in Brussels – 1906 in Xi'an, China) was the Belgian foundling who became an official or mandarin (bureaucrat) in the late Qing government. As both a Belgian and a Chinese mandarin, Paul acted as a liaison on various Sino-Belgian projects in the late nineteenth century. The best known are the negotiations for Belgium to build the first major railway in China, the Beijing-Hankou Railroad (Lu-Han Railway in China) and the development of a Belgian-Chinese industrial, mining and commercial enterprises in Lanzhou, the capital of Gansu province. Although better known in China where he was known by many names, including Lin Fuchen (林 輔臣), Su Pe Lin Ge Er de (斯普林格尔德), Lin Balu Lin Bao luo, Bi lishi Lin ('Belgian Lin'), Lin Darin, Lin Ta Jen, in European circles he developed the reputation for being the "Famous Belgian Mandarin." Paul also initiated negotiations for the First Iron Bridge Across the Yellow River in Lanzhou, China, now known as Zhongshan Bridge, but died before it was built.

== Biography ==
=== Early life ===
Paul was born in Brussels in 1842, and grew up as a foster child in the farming town of Ottenburg, southeast of the capital.

At the age of 23, in 1865, Paul left Belgium with the founding members of the Belgian missionary society, the Congregatio Immaculati Cordis Mariae (CICM Missionaries, Scheut fathers, or Missionhurst in the US) to Mongolia as their handyman and lay helper. Paul later found work at the Prussian (German) Legation in Beijing where he met the German geographer and geologist, Ferdinand von Richthofen. Paul assisted Richthofen as guide and interpreter on exploratory journeys through 18 of China's provinces between 1868 and 1872 to report on the minerals, flora, fauna and peoples of the various regions.

=== Paul the mandarin ===
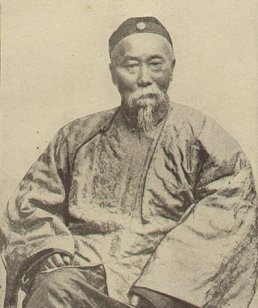
Li Hongzhang (feb 5 1823 - nov 7 1901).

While subsequently running a fur and wool trading business in Mongolia(1872–1881), Paul was called by viceroy Li Hongzhang to serve as Customs Inspector at the far western post of Jiuquan (also known as Suzhou) on the border with Xinjiang (新疆). During his 14 years as a mandarin in Jiuquan, he ran the Suzhou Small Pox clinic, and fostered understanding and appreciation of westerners, their culture and their technology (1881–1896).

=== Mandarin and Belgian ===
After his Jiuquan assignment, Paul was called upon by agents of Leopold II of Belgium to use his understanding of Chinese language and protocol to negotiate revisions to a contract for the construction of the Beijing Hankou railway. His successful efforts were rewarded with knighthood, and received a medal designating him a Chevalier de l'Ordre de la Couronne (Order of the Crown) (1897).

=== Death ===
Splingaerd was contacted by Lanzhou major Peng Yingjia to negotiate with Belgian companies for the construction of a bridge in Lanzhou. In 1906, he returned to Belgium for the first time in 40 years, to look for engineers and participating companies to construct a bridge in Lanzhou. However he couldn't get any company to sign a contract, and died from illness in Xi'an on the way back to Lanzhou.

=== Legacy ===
His son Alphonse, known in China as Lin Ah De (林阿德) or Lin Canzan (林參贊) stayed in Lanzhou together with some Belgians brought back by Splingaerd from his journey to Belgium. His son would work as an interpreter and counselor for the foreign community. He also left two more sons, Remy and Jean-Baptiste.

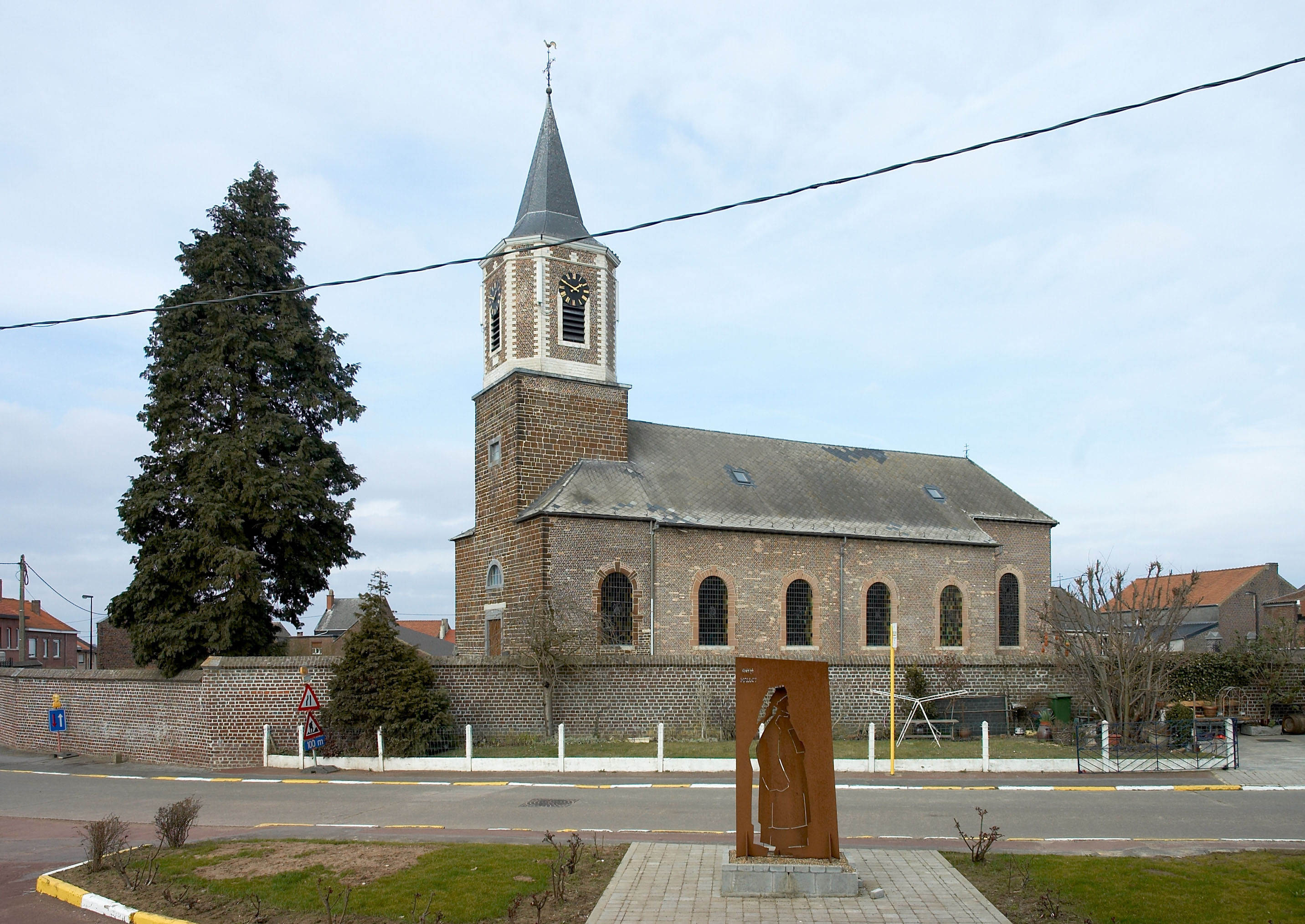
The church of Ottenburg - Statue of Mandarin Paul Splingaerd by Rene Hallet.

Many explorers, including Richthofen's student, Sven Hedin, and famous Russian geologist Vladimir Obruchev have written about their unexpected encounters with the red-bearded Belgian Mandarin.

Paul has also been the inspiration for characters in at least two novels: Vladimir Nabokov's last novel, The Gift, and the character Mo-sieu in Jean Blaise's Maator le Mongol. Belgian playwright Tone Brulin also based his musical, De staart van de mandarijn on Paul's life. On the 100th anniversary of Paul's 1906 death, the farming town of Ottenburg/Huldenberg, where he spent his first 21 years as a foster child, a statue was erected in his honor by the regional historical society. In 2008 the city of Jiuquan, where Paul served as a customs inspector for 14 years, another statue was erected in his honor.
