= Huldenberg =

- Municipality
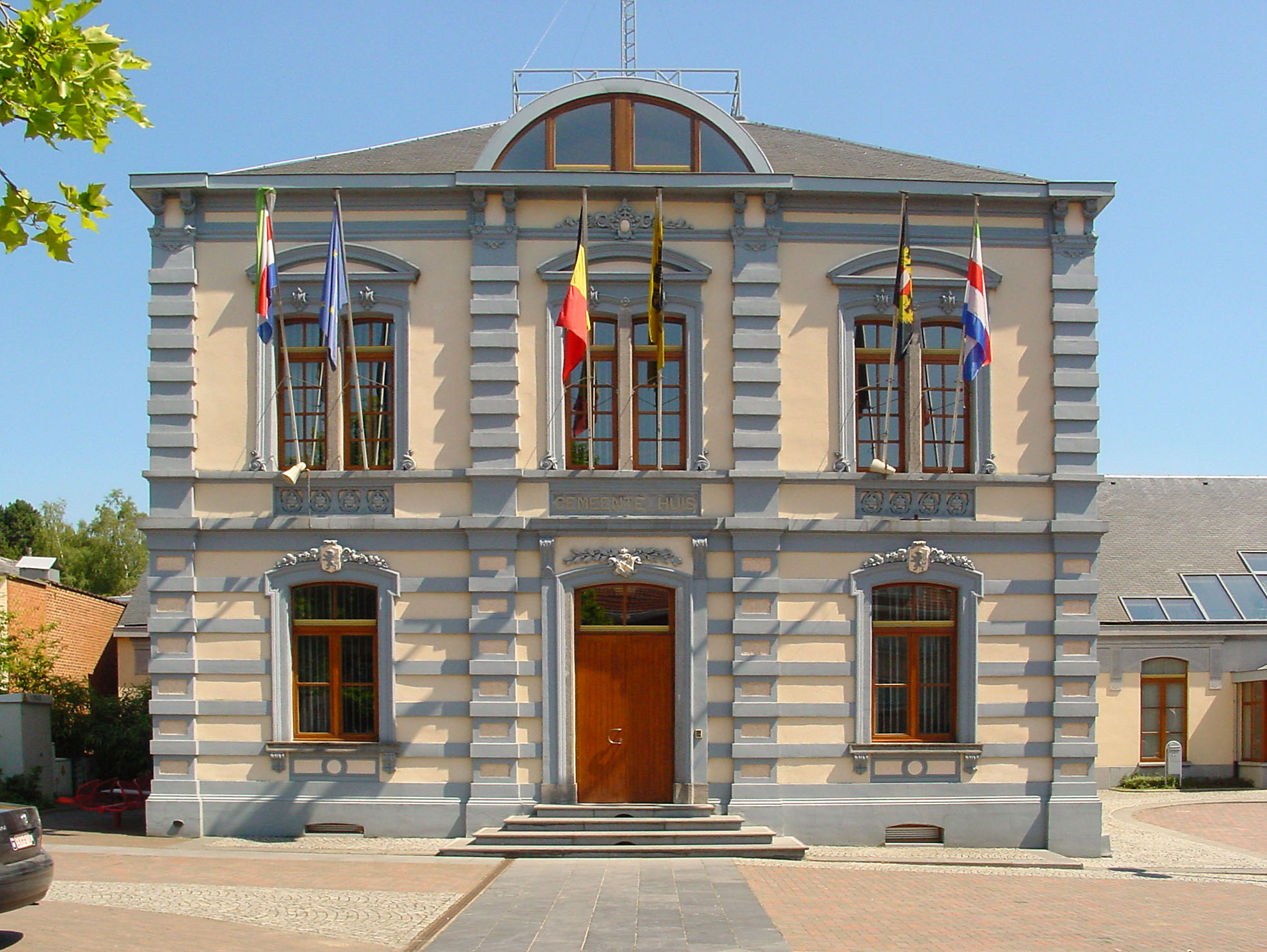
- Municipal hall

- Flag Coat of arms

- Location of Huldenberg in Flemish Brabant
- Interactive map of Huldenberg
- Location in Belgium
- Coordinates: 50°47′N 04°35′E
- Country: Belgium
- Community: Flemish Community
- Region: Flemish Region
- Province: Flemish Brabant
- Arrondissement: Leuven

Government
  - Mayor: Danny Vangoidtsenhoven (OpenVLD)
  - Governing parties: OpenVLD, Groen

Area
  - Total: 39.95 km^{2} (15.42 sq mi)

Population (2018-01-01)
  - Total: 9,892
  - Density: 247.6/km^{2} (641.3/sq mi)
- Postal codes: 3040
- NIS code: 24045
- Area codes: 016, 02
- Website: www.huldenberg.be

Huldenberg (Dutch pronunciation: [ˈɦʏldə(m)bɛr(ə)x]) is a municipality located in the Belgian province of Flemish Brabant. The municipality comprises the towns and villages of Huldenberg proper, Loonbeek, Neerijse, Ottenburg and Sint-Agatha-Rode. On 1 January 2011 Huldenberg had a total population of 9,464. The total area is 39.64 km² which gives a population density of 230 inhabitants per km².

It is the seat of the Belgian branch of the House of Limburg-Stirum.

It has a football club called VK Huldenberg, which was created from a fusion of the clubs FC Huldenberg and VK Rode.

Every Tuesday there is a market from 08:00 to 13:00. This market is located at the Gemeenteplein, near town hall.

At the end of WW II, Mary Churchill, daughter of the British prime minister, was a member of a British all-women anti-aircraft battery 481 that was stationed at Huldenberg for three months. She was entertained by the then burgomaster of Huldenberg, Count Thierry de Limburg Stirum and his wife Marie, née Princess of Croÿ. She noted that she found the local people very friendly and helpful and stated ("somewhat priggishly" she admitted) "...the flouting by all of and sundry of whatever regulations existed here, and the wide-spread use of the flourishing 'black market'. This had been regarded as almost a 'patriotic duty' during the occupation, but it was still going on now - apparently unrestrained."

== Gallery ==
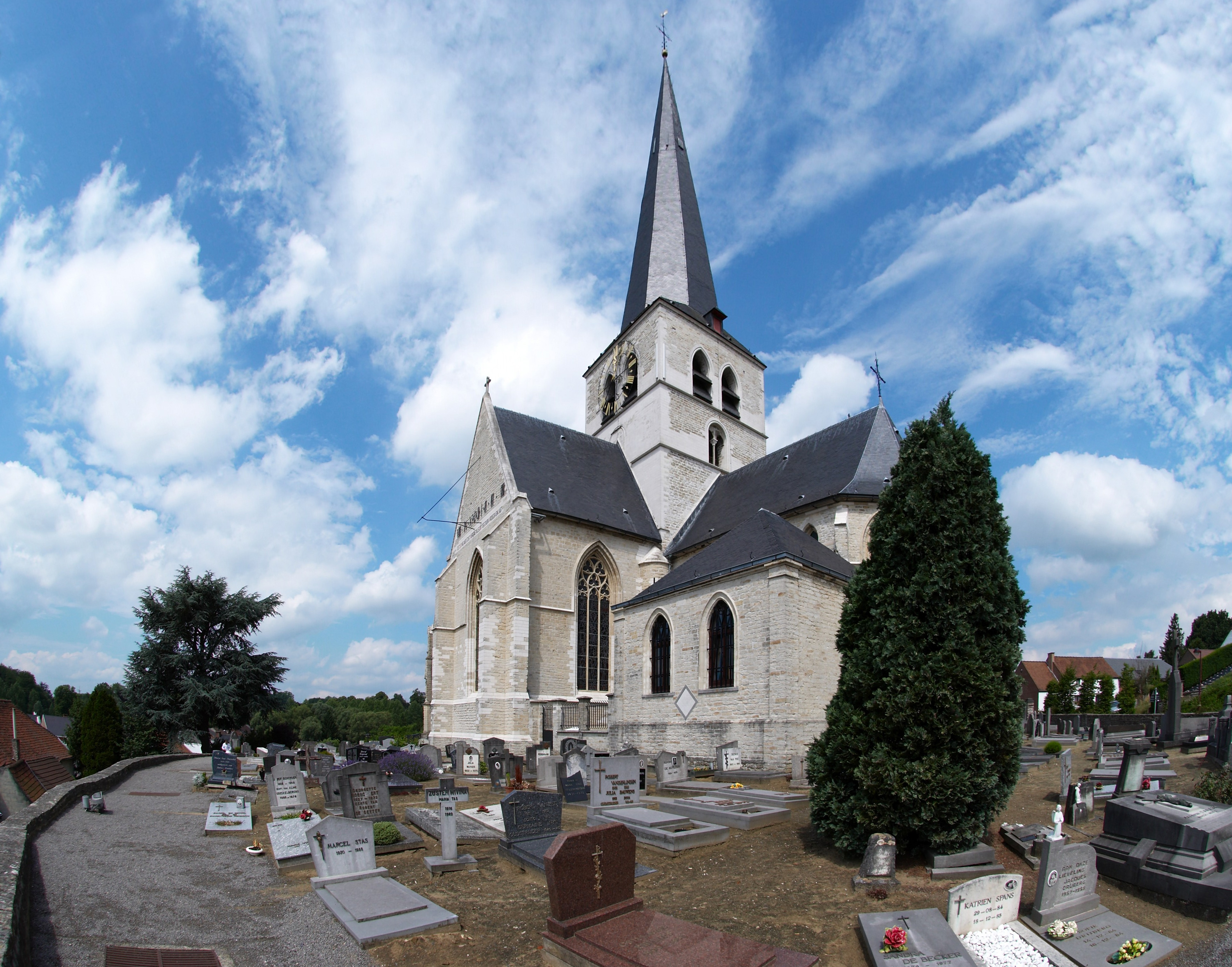
Church in Huldenberg

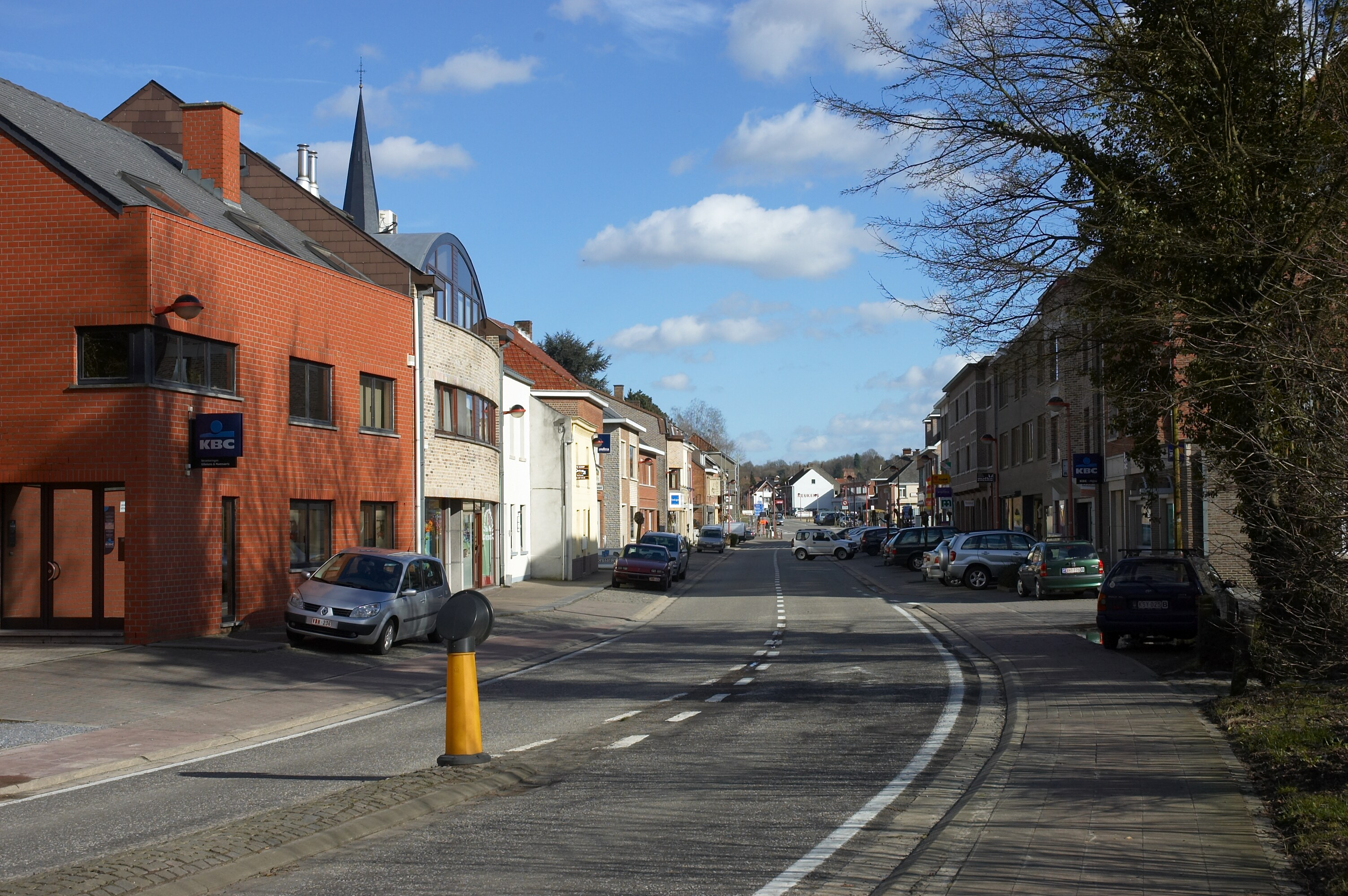
The Peuthystraat entering the center of Huldenberg

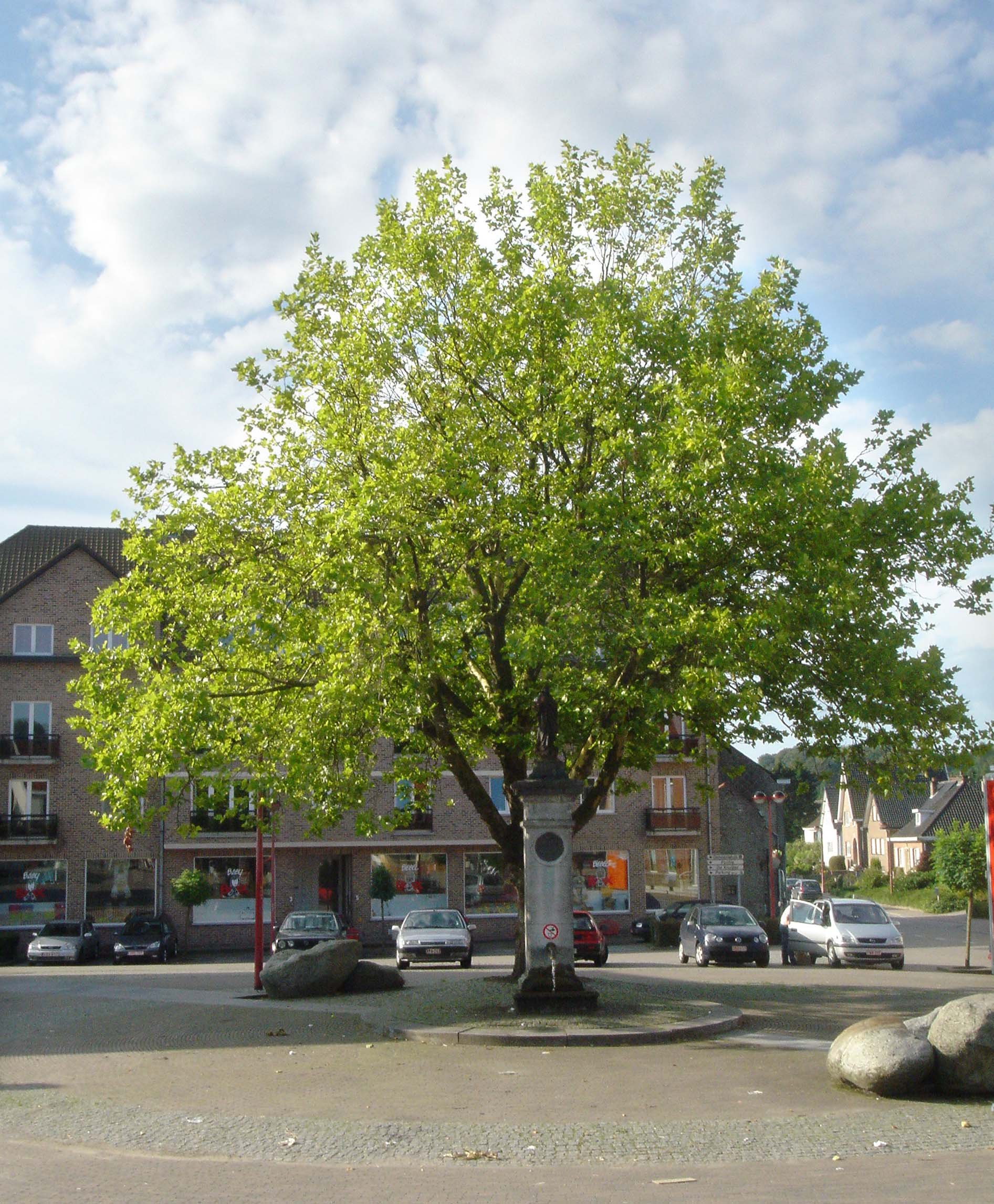
Freedomtree (Vrijheidsboom) (platanus) and a monument from 1906

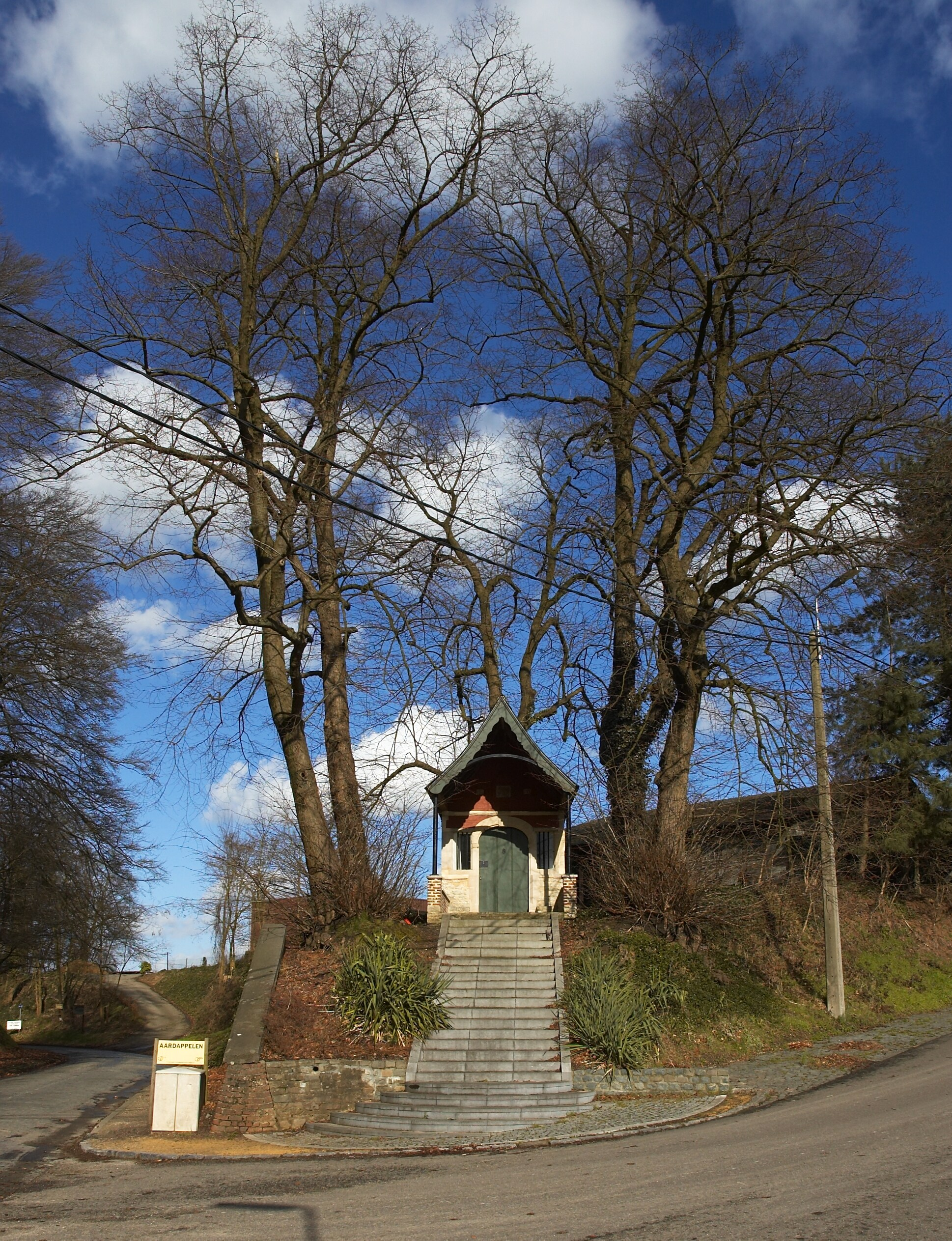
St.-Rochuschapel built in 1727

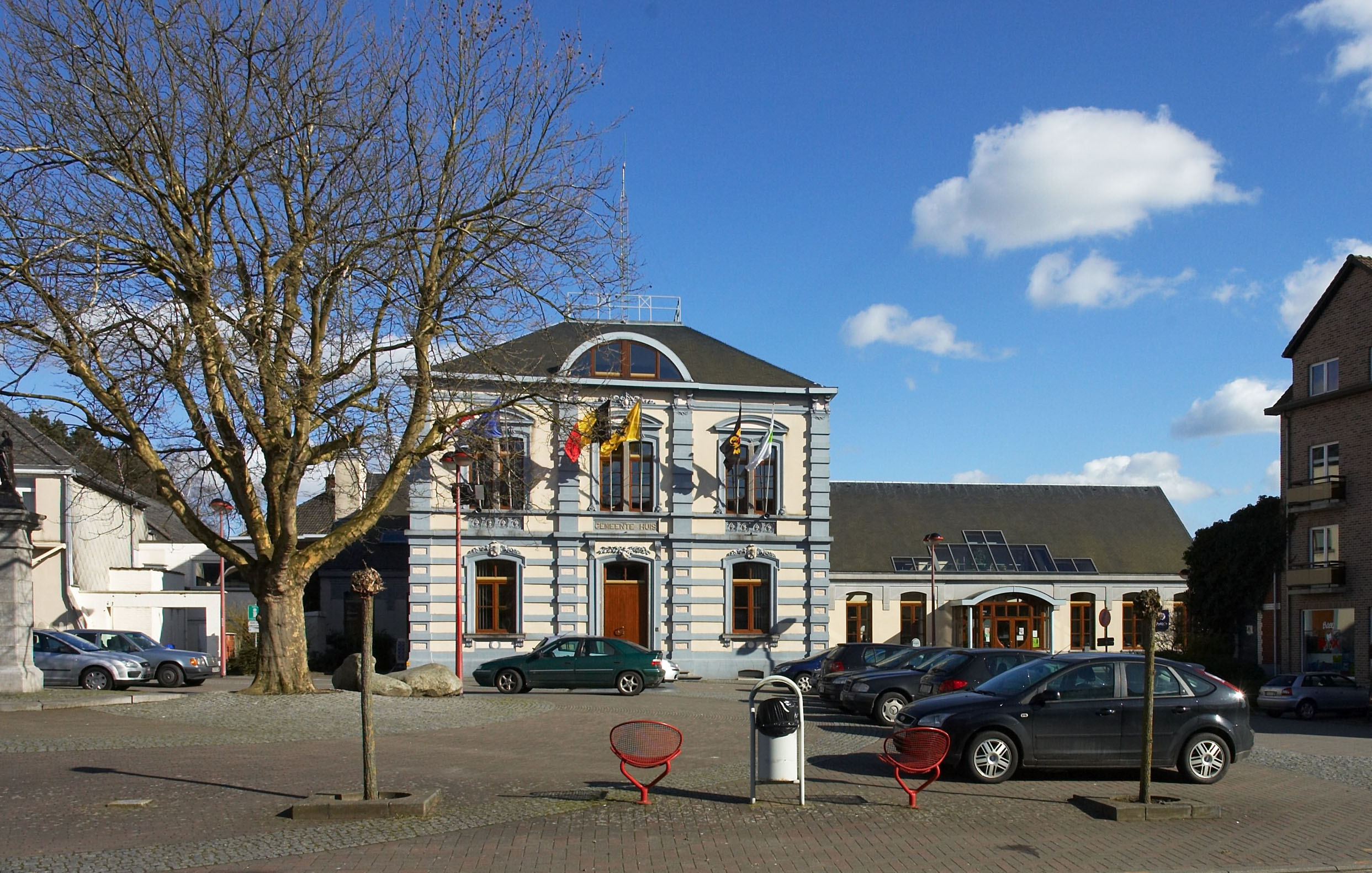
Municipality house Huldenberg

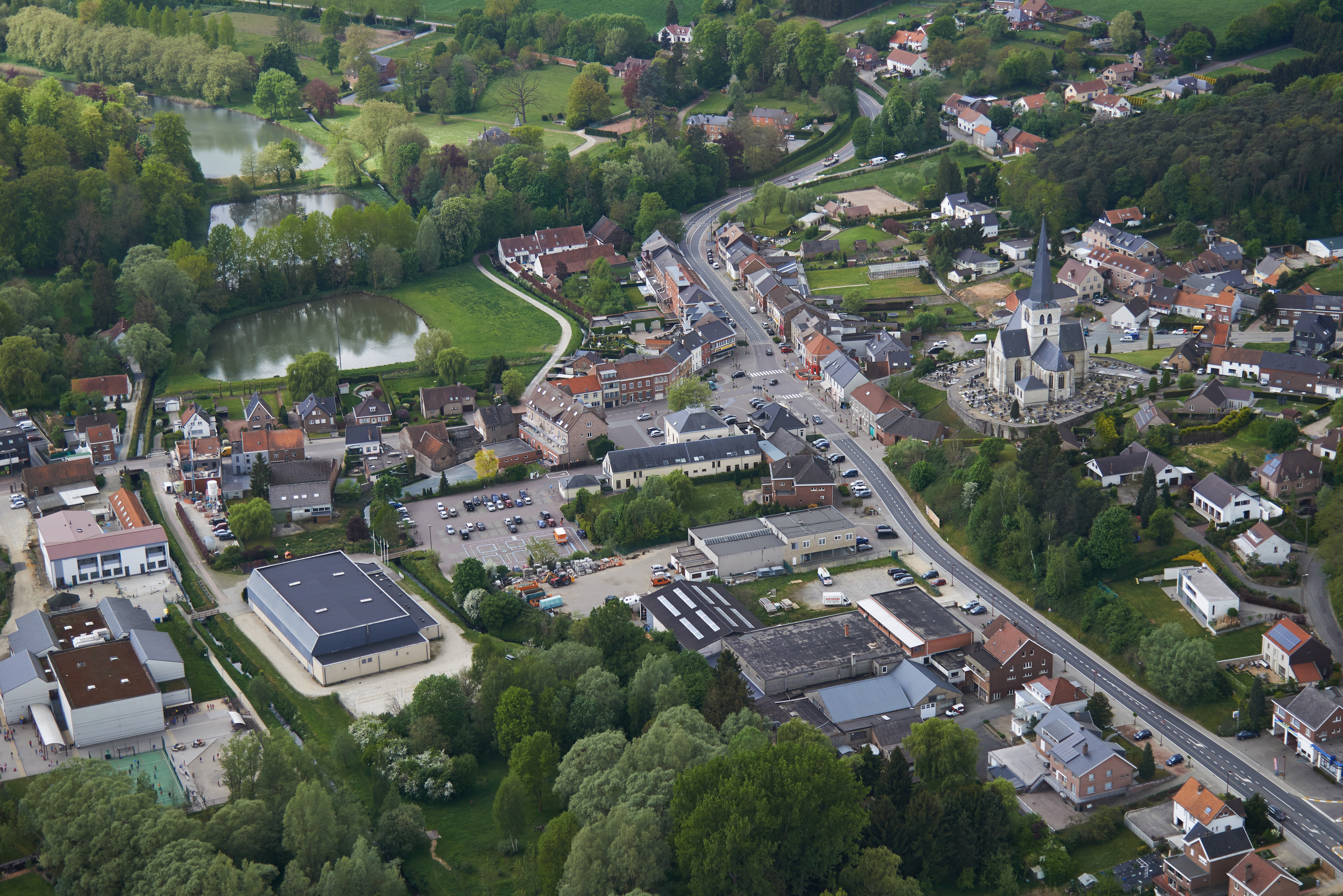
Aerial view of Huldenberg

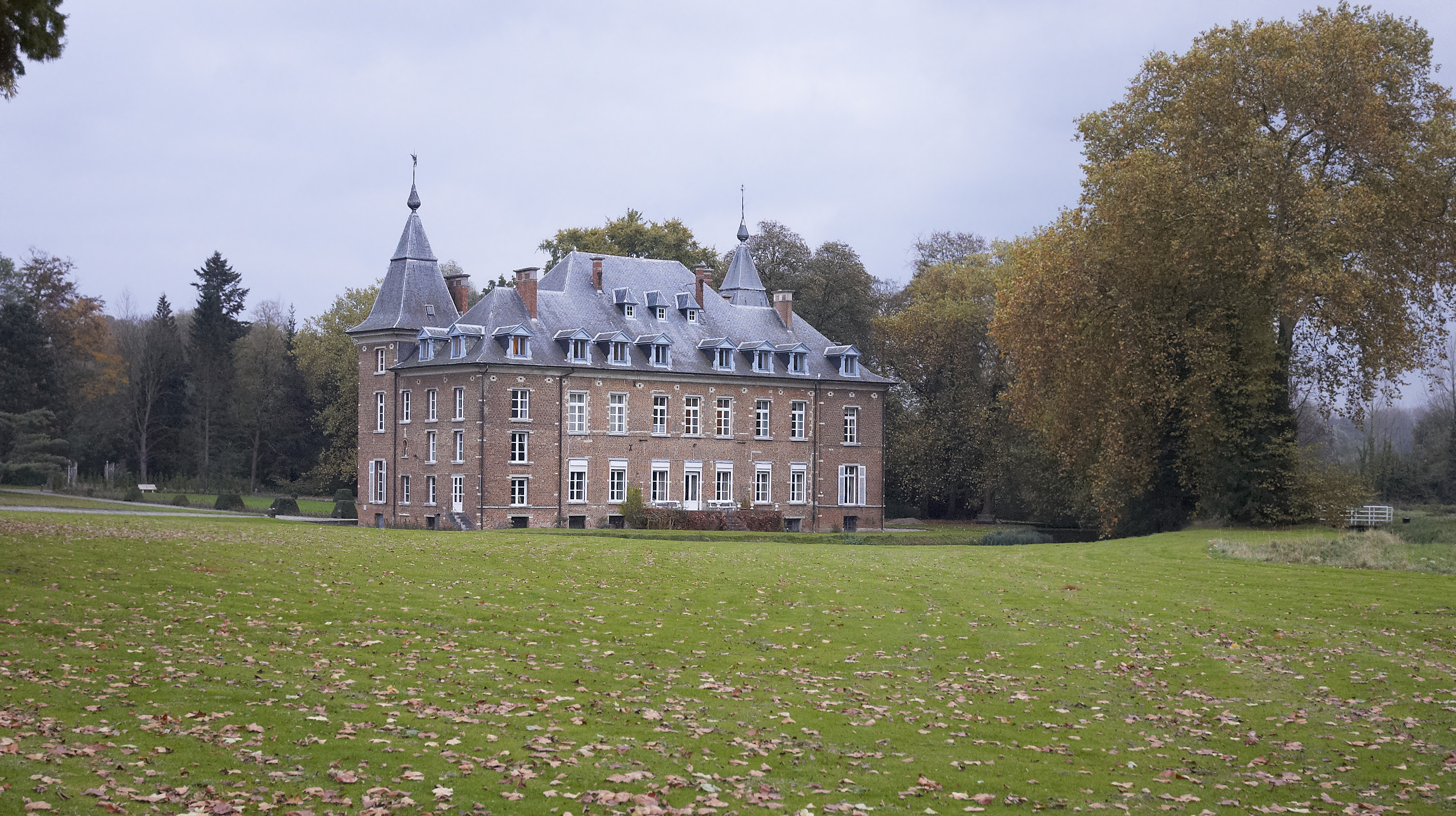
Castle of Huldenberg, belonging to the counts of Limburg-Stirum
