= Slava Ice Shelf =

Ice shelf in Antarctica

Slava Ice Shelf (68°49′S 154°44′E), is an ice shelf along the coast of Antarctica between Mawson Peninsula and Cape Andreyev. The feature was photographed from the air by the U.S. Navy (USN) Operation Highjump in 1947. The area was photographed in 1958 by the Soviet Antarctic Expedition (SovAE) which applied the name "Zaliv Slava" to the wide open bay that fronts this ice shelf. This name decision is in accord with the recommendation by ANCA that the name would be appropriately applied to the ice shelf. Named after the Soviet whaling flotilla Slava.

== See also ==
- Ice shelves of Antarctica
