= Obruchev Hills =

The Obruchev Hills (66°35′S 99°46′E) are a group of rounded hills on the coast between Denman Glacier and Scott Glacier, in East Antarctica.

The hills were plotted by the Western Base Party of the Australasian Antarctic Expedition (1911–1914) as a great rock face. They were plotted in greater detail from aerial photographs taken by U.S. Navy Operation Highjump (1946–47) and later by a Soviet expedition (1956), which named them after Vladimir Obruchev, Soviet geologist (1863–1956).
