= Plutonia (novel) =

1924 novel by Vladimir Obruchev

- First edition
- Author: Vladimir Obruchev
- Original title: Плутония
- Illustrator: M. Dobrov
- Cover artist: M. Dobrov
- Language: Russian
- Genre: Science fiction novel
- Publication date: 1924
- Publication place: Russia

Plutonia (Плутония) is a science fiction novel in the "lost world" genre by Russian academician and writer Vladimir Obruchev. It was first published in the original Russian in 1924.

== Plot ==
The title Plutonia refers to the novel's setting in an underground world with the source of light and heat turned out to be Earth's core, which the explorers called Pluto for the Roman god of the underworld. The terrain is marked by dramatic geographic features and inhabited by prehistoric animals and primitive people. These are essentially the animal and plant life of previous geological periods in their natural surroundings. As the characters venture deeper into the underground area, they encounter more and more ancient life forms, back to the dinosaurs and other species.

== Reception ==
Russian literary critic Yevgeny Neyolov praised both scientific and literary qualities of the book.

Kirkus Reviews said, "This is a most erudite adventure tale buttressed by accurate geological, biological and botanical information, geared for the intelligent reader."

Author David Whitehouse said, "The characterisation is poor and the plot overly simple, but the redeeming quality of the book is Obruchev's knowledge of geology."

== Translations ==
An English-language edition translated by Brian Pearce was published in 1955, issued by the State Publishing House for Geographical Literature, Moscow. Other English editions include a translation by Fainna Solasko with illustrations by G. Nikolsky, published in 1961 by Criterion Books.

Besides English, the novel has been translated into: Spanish (1953), German (1953), Finnish (1954), Ukrainian (1955), French (1955), Czech (1941), Hungarian (1956), Romanian (1956), Latvian (1957), Portuguese (1960), and Polish (1966).

== See also ==
- Hollow Earth
- Pellucidar
