= Scar Bluffs =

Coordinates: 68°48′S 153°32′E

Scar Bluffs is a three black, rectangular, steep-sided rock outcrops 27 nautical miles (50 km; 31 mi) south of Cape Hudson, Mawson Peninsula. Photographed by U.S. Navy Operation Highjump, 1946–47, the Soviet Antarctic Expedition, 1958, and ANARE (Australian National Antarctic Research Expeditions), 1959. Named by Antarctic Names Committee of Australia (ANCA) after the Scientific Committee on Antarctic Research (SCAR) of the International Council of Scientific Unions.
