= Horn Bluff =

Horn Bluff (68°21′S 149°45′E) is a prominent rocky headland on the northern side of the coastal island at the western side of Deakin Bay, Antarctica. The feature rises to 325 metres (1,070 ft) and is marked by the columnar structure of the dolerite forming the upper part of it. It was discovered and mapped as part of the mainland by the Australasian Antarctic Expedition (1911–14) under Douglas Mawson, who named the formation for W.A. Horn of Adelaide, a patron of the expedition. The headland was shown to be on an island by Australian National Antarctic Research Expeditions air photos taken in 1962.
