= Cook's Bay =

Cook's Bay or Cooks Bay may refer to:

- Cook's Bay (Ontario), Canada
- Cook's Bay (Moorea), French Polynesia
- Cooks Bay (Minnesota)
- Cooks Bay, offshore from the town of Cooks Beach, New Zealand

== See also ==
- Cook Bay (disambiguation)
