= Zhongshan Bridge =

Zhongshan Bridge 中山桥
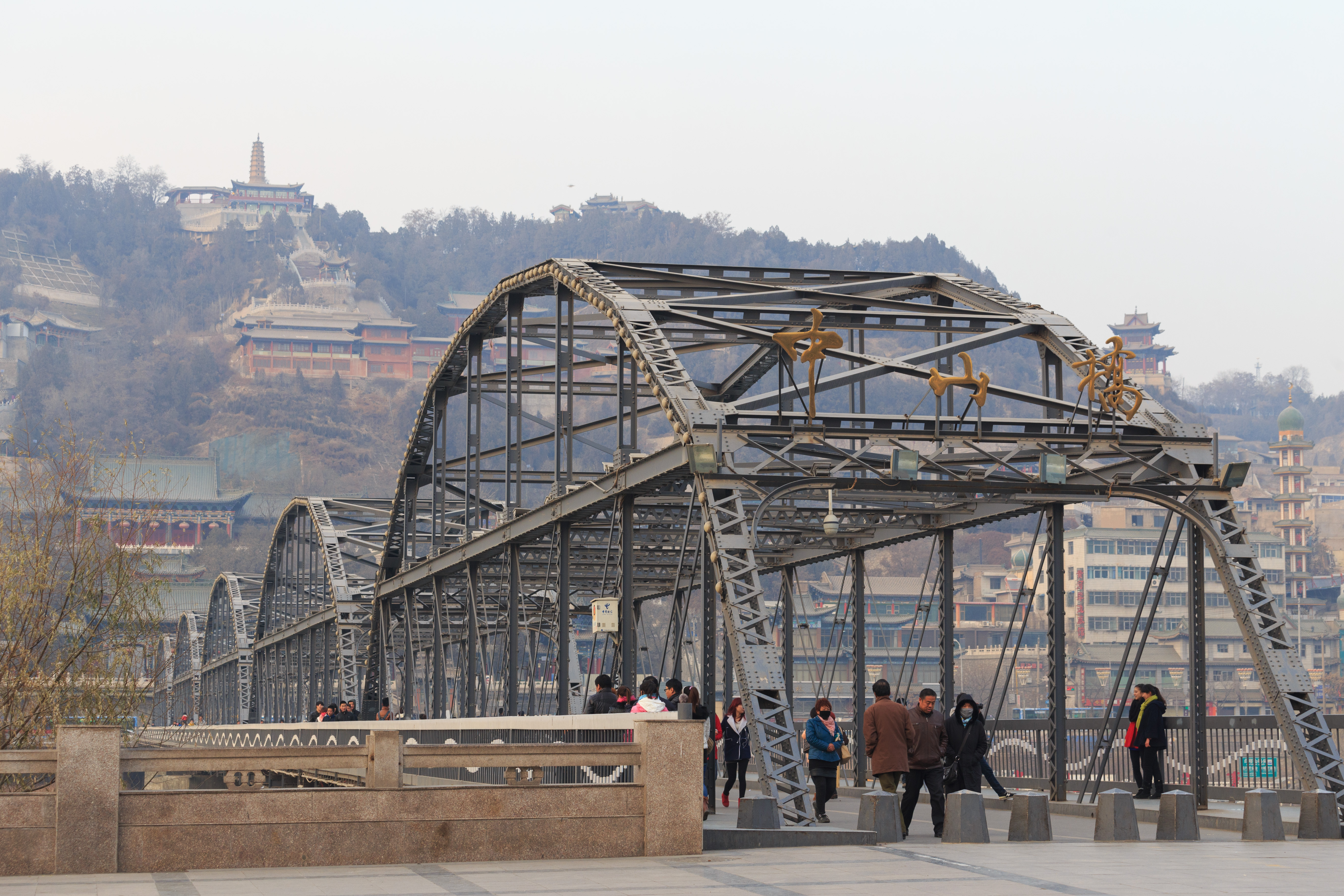
- Coordinates: 36.064846°N 103.814518°E
- Crosses: Yellow River
- Locale: Lanzhou, Gansu, China
- Heritage status: yes

Characteristics
- Material: Iron
- Total length: 233.5 m (766 ft)
- Width: 8.46 m (27.8 ft)
- Longest span: 45.9 m (151 ft)
- No. of spans: 5
- Piers in water: 4
- Clearance above: 4.8

History
- Engineering design by: American Bridge Company
- Constructed by: Telge & Schroeter
- Construction start: 1907
- Construction end: July 1909
- Construction cost: 165,000 silver coins
- Opened: 19 August 1909

Location
- Interactive map of Zhongshan Bridge

The Zhongshan Bridge (Chinese: 中山桥) is a steel truss bridge over the Yellow River in Lanzhou. Opened in 1909, it was the first permanent bridge over the Yellow River. The bridge is one of the most well-known landmarks of Lanzhou. Construction of the bridge began in 1907 and the bridge was completed in 1909.

At its opening, the bridge was simply known as the 'First Bridge', but in 1928 it was renamed Zhongshan Bridge to honour Sun Yat-sen. Originally, the bridge was painted bright red, but during the Second Sino-Japanese War the bridge was painted dark grey to successfully evade bombings, a colour which it remains in today.

== History ==
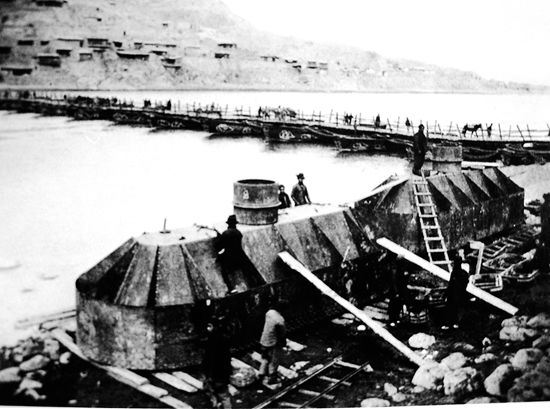
Construction of the bridge pillars with the floating bridge in the background.

In 1372, general Feng Sheng was ordered to defend the remains of the Yuan dynasty west of the Yellow River, so he sent one of his commanders to build a pontoon bridge over the Yellow River seven li west of Lanzhou. In 1385, the pontoon bridge was moved below Baitashan near the city of Lanzhou, where the river flowed faster and the bridge would be easier to defend. The pontoon bridge would remain for another 524 years. It was at this location that Zhongshan bridge would be built too.

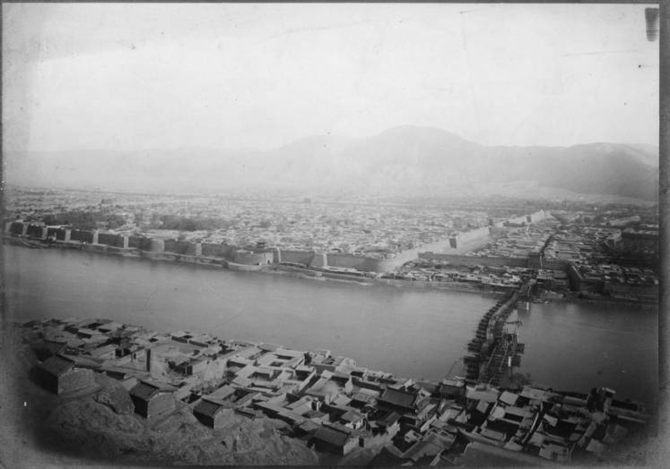
1906 photograph by Robert Sterling Clark showing the iron bridge and pontoon bridge

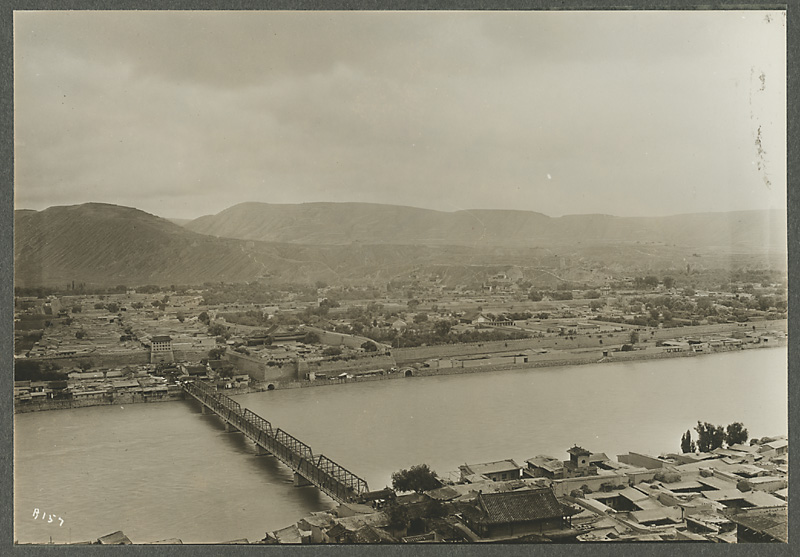
The bridge in 1925

The pontoon bridge improved transportation, but during high water it would be impassable, and during winter, it was damaged by ice. Hence the bridge was disassembled each winter, only to be assembled again come spring.

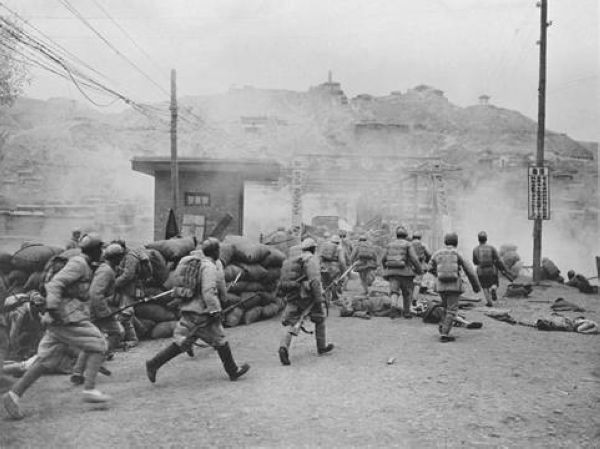
PLA captured Zhongshan bridge on August 26, 1949

In 1866 Zuo Zongtang, governor of Gansu and Shaanxi, decided that an iron bridge had to be built. He negotiated with a German businessman, but they could not agree on the price, so the plan was shelved. After a flood destroyed the pontoon bridge again in 1904, the need for an iron bridge became urgent.

Belgian-born Lanzhou native Paul Splingaerd, known also by his Chinese name Lin Fuchen (林輔臣), was contacted by Lanzhou major Peng Yingjia to negotiate with Belgian companies for the construction of a bridge in Lanzhou. In 1906, he returned to Belgium for the first time in 40 years, to look for engineers and participating companies to construct a bridge in Lanzhou. However he could not get any company to sign a contract, and died from illness on the way back to Lanzhou.

Later that year, construction of an iron bridge was negotiated successfully with the German company Telge & Schroeter operating out of Tianjin. In addition, an 80-year warranty was negotiated for the bridge to survive the torrent of the river. The bridge was designed by an American company and would have a maximum load of 8 tonnes, meant for horse-drawn carriages.

Steel truss components, cement and a variety of equipment and machinery was all brought in from Germany through the port of Tianjin. Since the Longhai railway wasn't completed yet, everything was brought by train up to Xinxiang railway station, then by horse-drawn carts to Lanzhou via Xi'an. In 1909, after 21 months, all 36 batches of materials had arrived in Lanzhou.

Construction of the bridge started on May 9, 1908.

The bridge was painted with a mixture of fish oil and rosin, making it bright orange.

On 26 July 1909, the completion of the bridge was celebrated with a banquet. Finally, on 19 August 1909 the bridge was opened to traffic.

Pailou were built on both ends of the bridge shortly before the bridge's completion. However, they were destroyed during the Republic of China period.

During the Sino-Japanese war, the bridge was painted grey to avoid bombing by Japanese war planes. The color has remained since then.

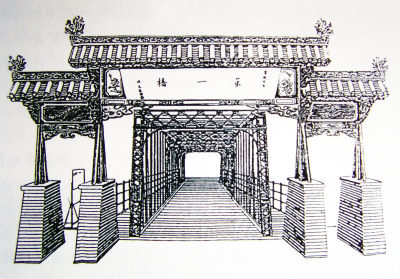
Drawing of pailou in front of the bridge

In 1954, the bridge structure was strengthened with steel arches placed on top of the truss structure.

In 2002, motor vehicles over 0.5 tonnes were prohibited from using the bridge, which was never designed for use by cars or trucks.

In 2013, all motor vehicles were prohibited on the bridge.

== Gallery ==
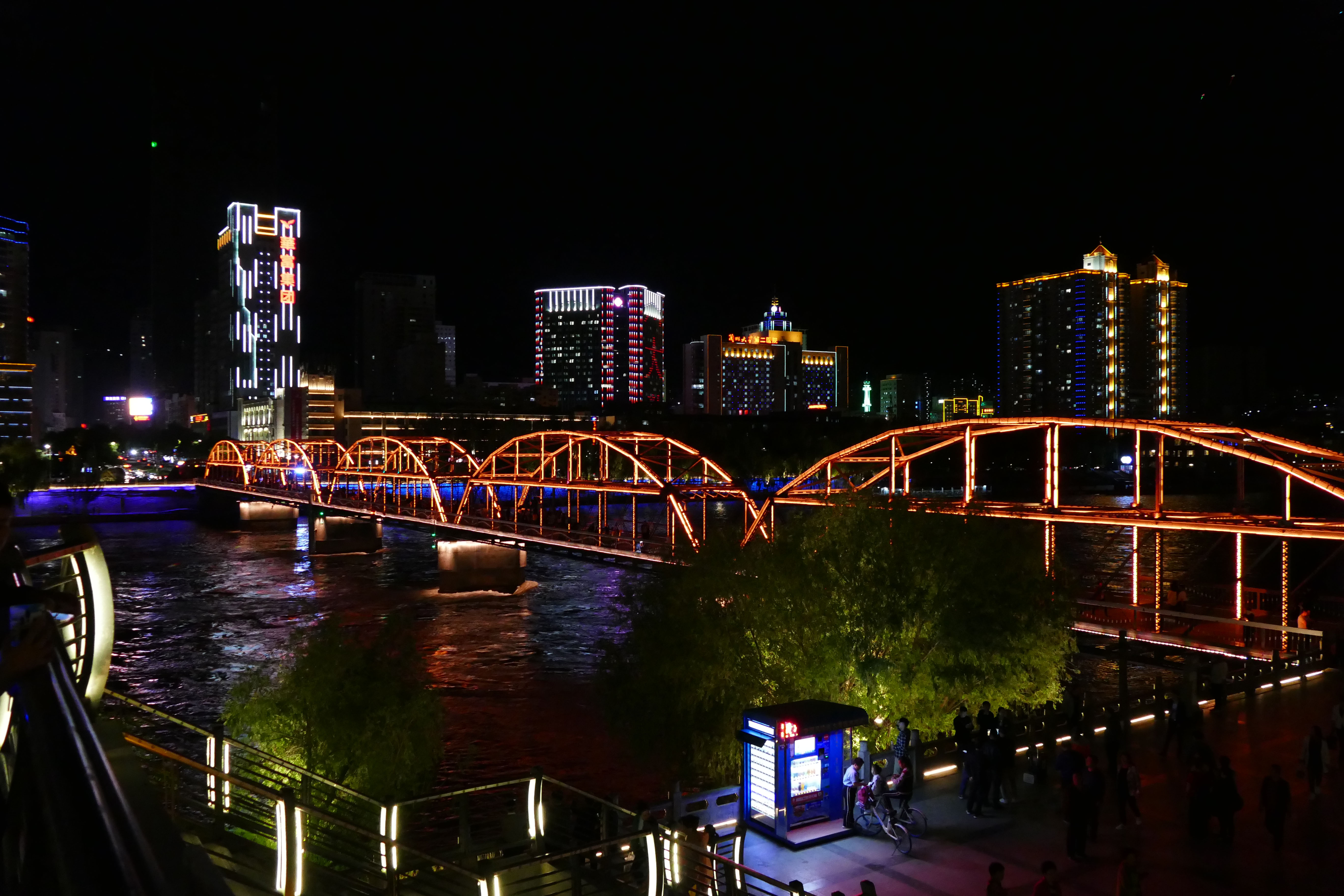

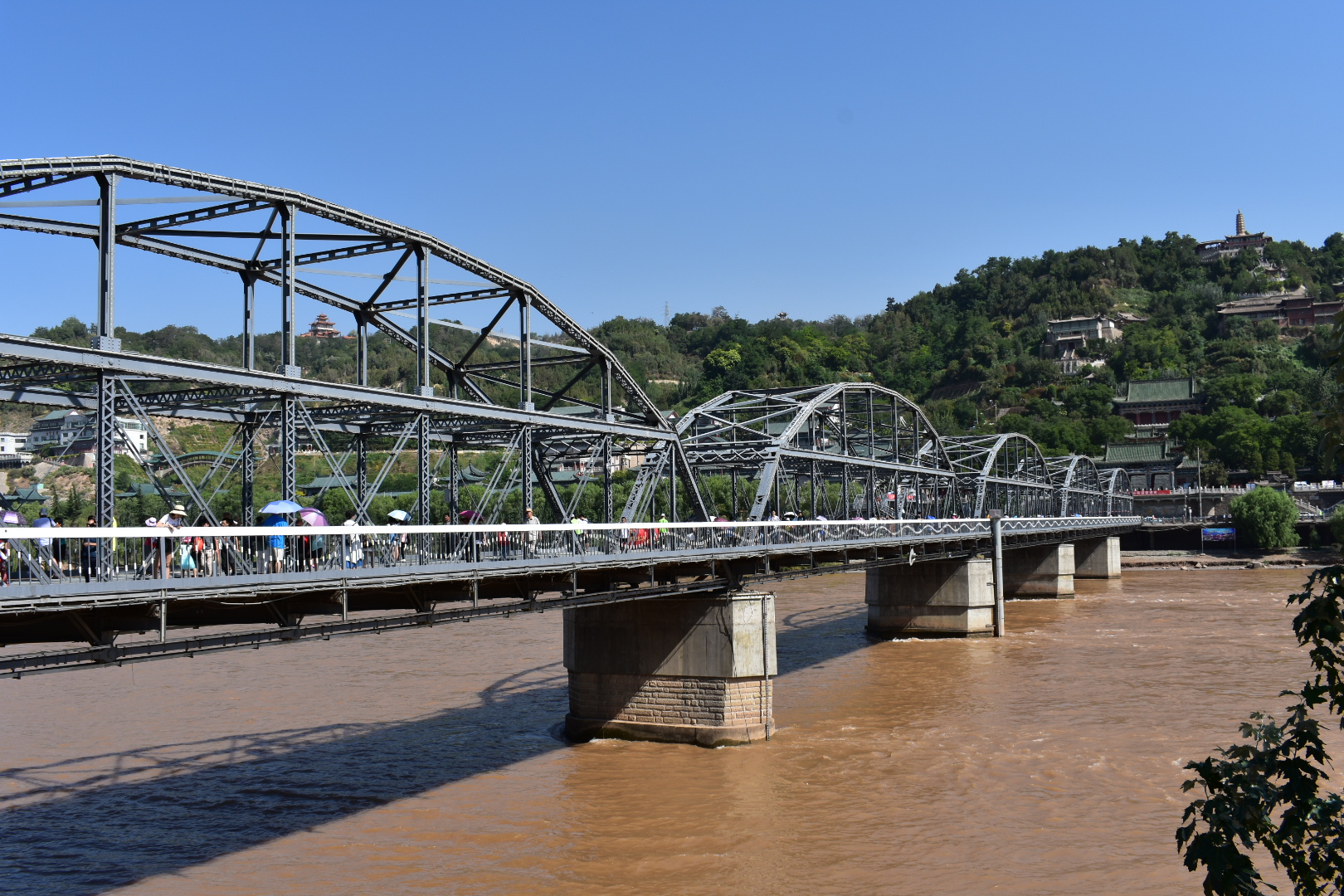

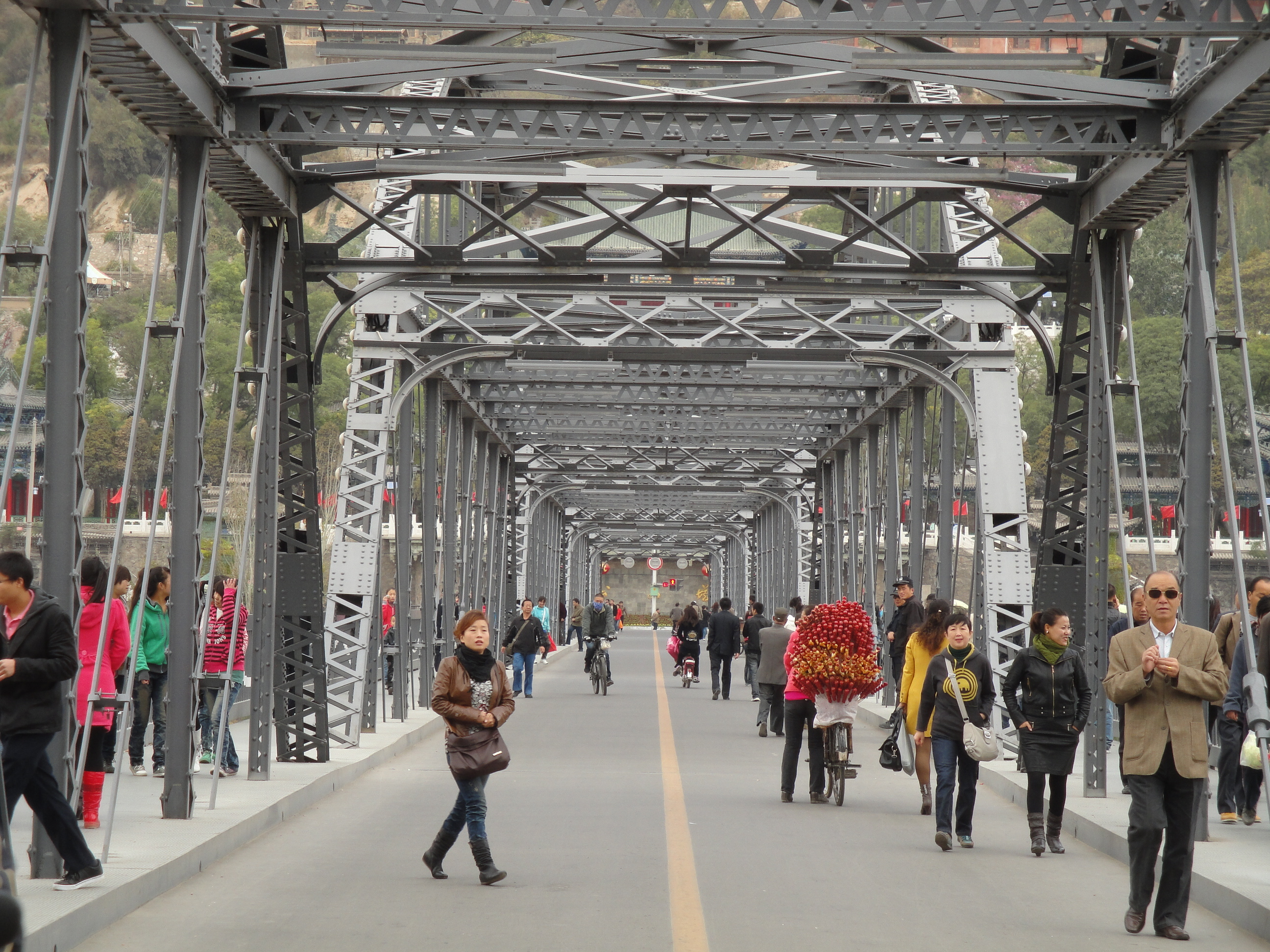

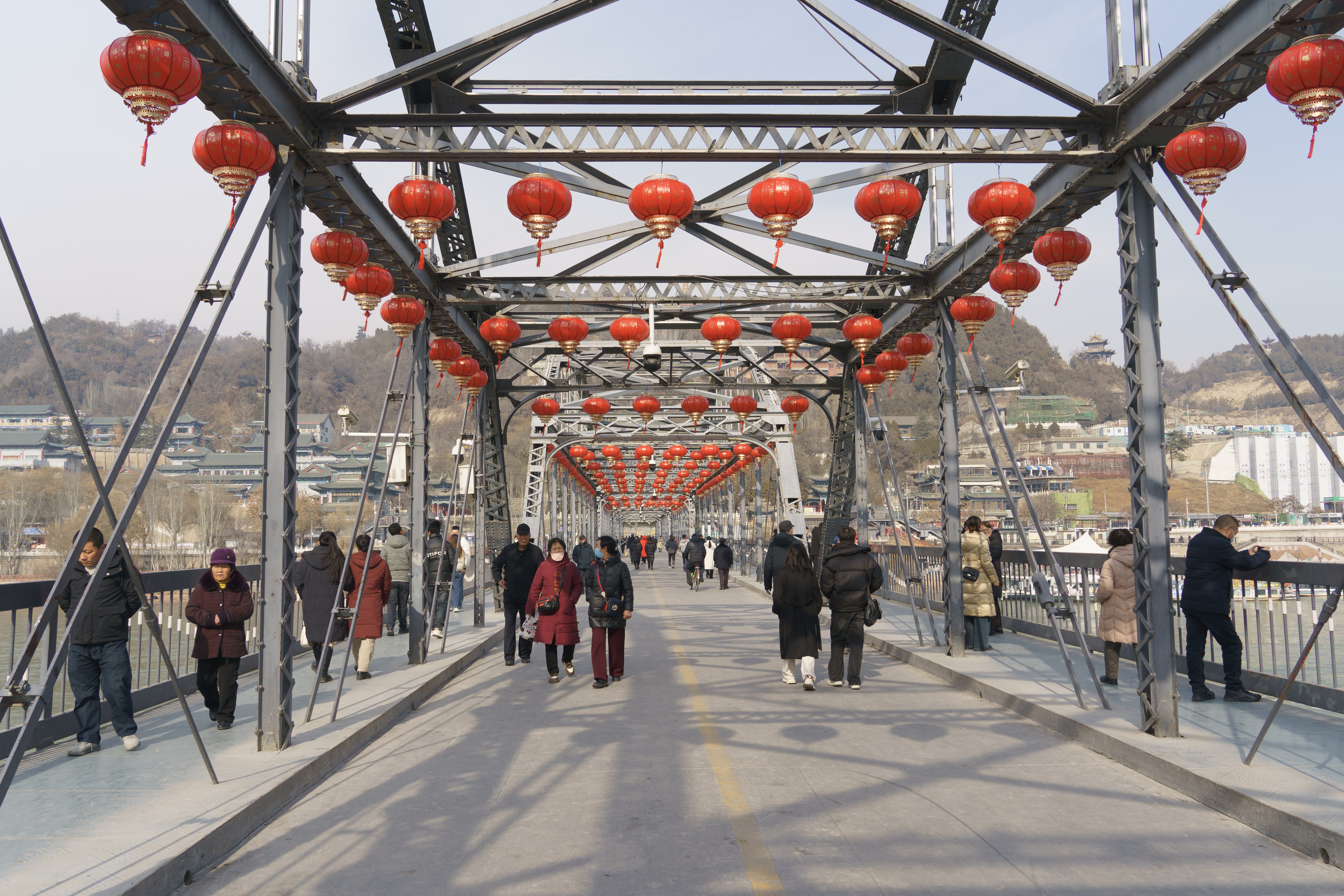
