= Cape Andreyev =

Cape Andreyev (68°55′S 155°12′E) is a cape which marks the southeast limit of the Slava Ice Shelf. Photographed by U.S. Navy Operation Highjump, 1946–47, and the Soviet Antarctic Expedition, 1956. Named by the Soviets in 1960 for Professor A.I. Andreyev, investigator of the history of geographic discovery.
