= Deakin Bay =

Bay in Antarctica

Deakin Bay (68°23′S 150°10′E) is a wide, open bay on the coast between Horn Bluff and Cape Freshfield. The bay was roughly delineated by the Far Eastern Party of the Australasian Antarctic Expedition (1911–1914) under Sir Douglas Mawson, who named it for Alfred Deakin, Prime Minister of Australia in 1910.

In certain historical accounts and charts this feature has been correlated with "Peacock Bay" of the U.S. Exploring Expedition (1838–1842) under Lieutenant Charles Wilkes, U.S. Navy.
