= Ottenburg =

Coordinates: 50°45′10″N 4°36′55″E

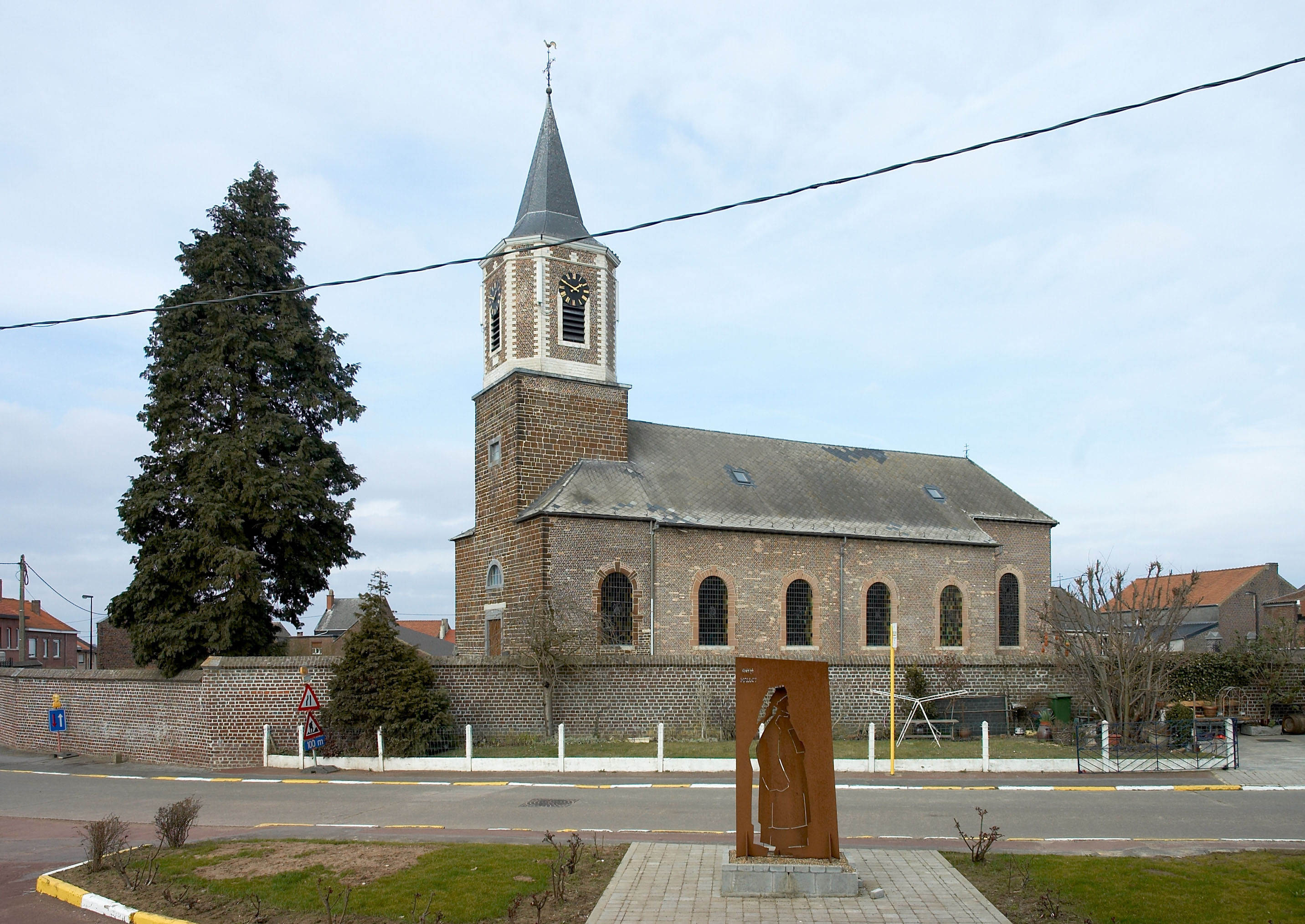
The church of Ottenburg (with statue of mandarin Paul Splingaerd by René Hallet in the foreground)

Ottenburg is a village in the municipality of Huldenberg in the province of Flemish Brabant, Belgium, close to the language border. The prehistoric earthwork, a long barrow known as de Tomme, is located here, identified in 2021 by archaeologists as the oldest such monument known in the Low Countries.

During the period of French occupation (1795–1815), Ottenburg was known as Ottenbourg and was in the department of the Dyle.

Paul Splingaerd (1842–1906), who became a mandarin in China, lived in Ottenburg in his youth.
