= Vladimir Obruchev =

Russian geologist and writer (1863–1956)

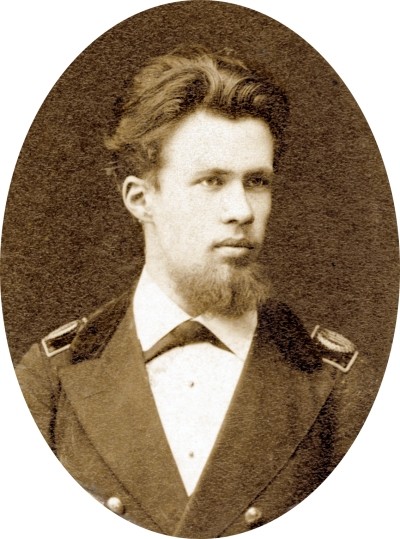
- 1886 photo
- Born: Vladimir Afanasyevich Obruchev; October 10, 1863; Rzhev, Tver Governorate, Russian Empire
- Died: June 19, 1956 (aged 92); Moscow, Russian SFSR, Soviet Union
- Occupations: Geologist, novelist
- Writing career
- Genre: Science fiction
- Notable works: Plutonia (novel), Sannikov's Land, In the Wilds of Central Asia

Signature
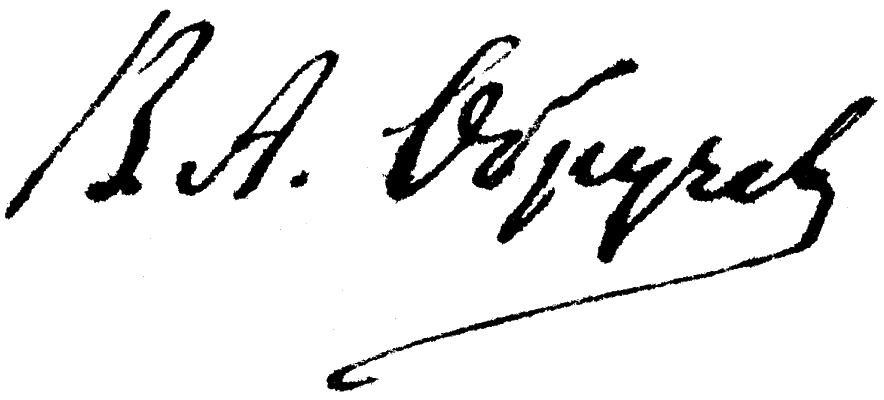

Vladimir Afanasyevich Obruchev (Russian: Влади́мир Афана́сьевич О́бручев; 10 October [O.S. 28 September] 1863 – June 19, 1956) was a Russian and Soviet geologist who specialized in the study of Siberia and Central Asia. He was also one of the first Russian science fiction authors.

== Scientific research ==
Vladimir Obruchev graduated from the Petersburg Mining Institute in 1886. His early work involved the study of gold-mining, which led him to come up with a theory explaining the origin of gold deposits in Siberia. He also gave advice on construction of the Central Asian and Trans-Siberian Railways and consulted Sven Hedin on his projected journey to Siberia. While working for the railway, Obruchev explored the Karakum Desert, the shores of the Amu Darya River, and the old riverbeds of the Uzbois. He also worked as a geologist on Lake Baikal, on the Lena River, and in gold fields near the Vitim.

Between 1892 and 1894, Obruchev "was a member of the Grigory Potanin's expedition into ... Mongolia, [and] to the mountains of Nan Shan and Northern China." He also explored the Transbaikal area, Dzungaria, and Altai. Largely as a result of his participation in this expedition he became interested in loess and made considerable contributions to the study of loess deposits.

In 1929, Obruchev was elected to the Academy of Sciences of the Soviet Union.

Having spent half a century in exploring Siberia and Inner Asia, Obruchev summarized his findings with a three-volume monograph, The Geology of Siberia (1935–1938), followed by The History of Geological Exploration of Siberia. Many of his works deal with the origins of loess in Central Asia and Siberia, ice formation and permafrost in Siberia, problems of Siberian tectonics, and Siberian goldfields. He also authored many popular scientific works, such as Formation of Mountains and Ore Deposits (1932), Fundamentals of Geology (1944), Field Geology (1927), Ore Deposits (1928–1929), and others. All together, Obruchev authored

over a thousand scientific works, among which are a most extensive geological study of Siberia and a five-volume history of the geological exploration of Siberia, which have been awarded the Lenin Prize as well as the prizes and medals of several scientific societies.

He was the director of the Geological Institute (1930-1933) and the Permafrost Institute (1939-1956) of the Academy of Sciences of the Soviet Union.

During 1954, he completed an extensive geographical study of Nan Shan Mountains in China based on his own and previous expeditions to the region and spent his last years working up a geological study of the mountains.

== Works of fiction ==
In his native country Obruchev is best known as the author of two perennially popular science fiction novels, Plutonia (Плутония, 1915) and Sannikov Land (Земля Санникова, 1924). Both of these stories, imitating the pattern of Arthur Conan Doyle's The Lost World, depict in vivid detail the discovery of an isolated world of prehistoric animals in hitherto unexplored large islands north of Alaska or Siberia. In Plutonia, dinosaurs and other Jurassic species are found in a fictional underground area north of Alaska. The descriptive passages are made more credible by Obruchev's extensive knowledge of paleontology. "Sannikov Land" is named for a phantom island of the Arctic Ocean, reported historically by Yakov Sannikov in 1811. Paul J. McAuley praised the novel in a 1999 column, saying "It's true that the characters are indistinguishably wooden mouthpieces for the author's opinions, and the plot is pure pulp, but all this is redeemed by the novel's rigorous scientific sensibility."

During the Soviet period, Obruchev attempted to emulate Edwardian models of boys' adventure stories in his novels Golddiggers in the Desert (1928) and In the Wilds of Central Asia (1951).

== Official positions ==
- Professor of the Tomsk Engineering Institute (1919–1921),
- Professor of the Tavrida University in Simferopol (1918–1919),
- Professor of the Moscow Mining Academy (1921–1929);
- Member of the Academy of Sciences of the Soviet Union (1929);
- Chairman of the Committee on Permafrost Studies (since 1930);
- Director of the Institute of Permafrost Studies of the Academy of Sciences of the Soviet Union (since 1939);
- Secretary of the Department of Geological and Geographical Sciences of the Academy of Sciences of the Soviet Union (1942–1946);
- Honorary president of the Soviet Geographical Society (since 1948)

== Awards and honors ==
- The Przhevalsky Prize, 1894
- Order of Saint Vladimir IV degree, 1895
- Two Chikhachyov Prizes from the French Academy of Sciences (1898 and 1925)
- The Constantine Medal of the Russian Geographical Society (1900)
- Lenin Prize for the book Geologie von Sibirien (in German), 1926
- The first ever Karpinsky Gold Medal (1947)
- The Stalin Prizes (1941, 1950)
- Orders of Lenin (1943, 1948, 1953)
- Order of the Red Banner of Labour, and numerous medals.
- Hero of Socialist Labour (1945)

== Obruchev namesakes ==
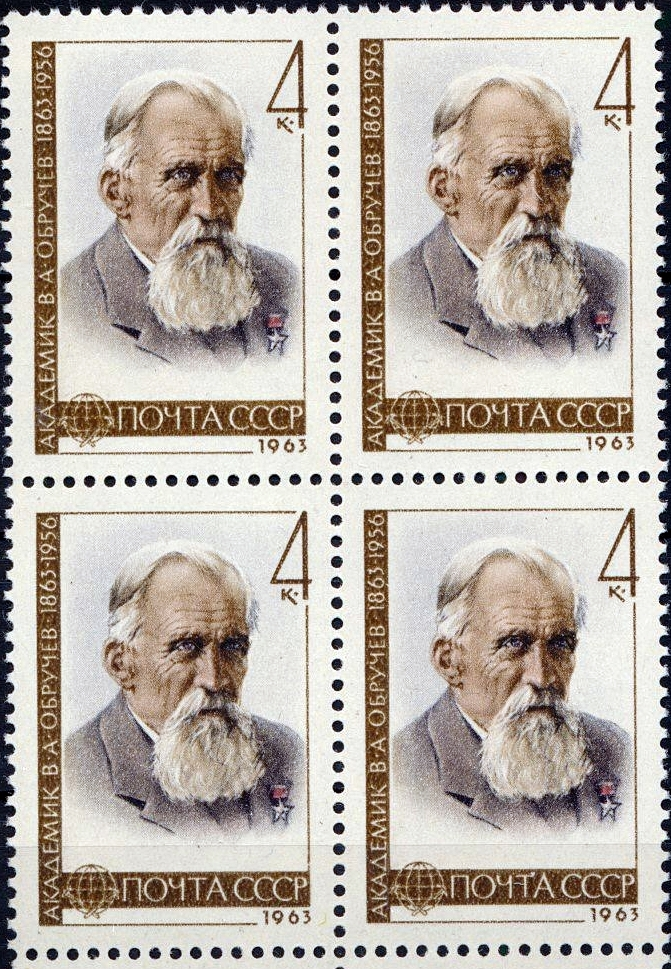
Vladimir A. Obruchev, USSR Post stamp issued in 1963 at the occasion of his 100th birthday

- Obruchevite, a mineral.
- Academician Obruchev's Range in Tuva
- A mountain in the upper reaches of the Vitim River
- An oasis in Antarctica
- Obruchev Hills, a group of rounded hills in Antarctica
- Obruchev (crater) on the Moon
- Mount Obruchev, a mountain in Antarctica
- The Obruchev Prize was established by the Academy of Sciences of the Soviet Union in 1938 to honor best works in the field of Siberian geology.
- Vladimir Obruchev – oil and gas research vessel: built at Kirov shipyard, Khabarovsk; will operate in Caspian Sea.

== Family ==
- Vladimir Vladimirovich Obruchev, geological economist
- Sergei Obruchev, a geologist, discovered the Chersky Range in Siberia.
- Dmitry Obruchev, a paleontologist, was a leading authority on early vertebrates.

== Bibliography ==
- Fundamentals Of Geology, Foreign Languages Publishing House, Moscow. From Archive.org
- (1924) Plutoniya (Плутония); English translation: Plutonia (1957), Moscow: Raduga Publishers, ISBN 5-05-001691-6
- (1926) Zemlya Sannikova (Земля Санникова); English translation: Sannikov Land (1988), Moscow: Raduga Publishers, ISBN 5-05-001690-8
