= Mawson Peninsula =

Peninsula in Antarctica

Mawson Peninsula (68°35′S 154°11′E) is a high (455-metre (1,500 ft)), narrow, ice-covered peninsula on the George V Coast, on the west side of the Slava Ice Shelf, Antarctica, terminating in Cape Hudson. It extends for over 30 nautical miles (56 km) in a northwesterly direction. The peninsula was photographed from the air by U.S. Navy Operation Highjump, 1946–47, and was sketched and photographed by Phillip Law of the Australian National Antarctic Research Expeditions who flew along it to its northern end in February 1959. It was named by the Antarctic Names Committee of Australia for Sir Douglas Mawson.

Cape Hudson (68°20′S 153°45′E) is the north cape of Mawson Peninsula. Land was sighted in this area on January 19, 1840, by the crew of Lt. William L. Hudson's USS Peacock during the United States Exploring Expedition (1838–42) under Charles Wilkes, who applied the name Cape Hudson. An analysis by B.P. Lambert and P.G. Law of the USEE chart, and of the photographs taken by USN Operation Highjump (1946–47) and ANARE (Australian National Antarctic Research Expeditions) (1959), suggests that the north cape of Mawson Peninsula is Wilkes' Cape Hudson.
