= Kortenberg Abbey =

Abbey in the Duchy of Brabant

- Abdij Kortenberg
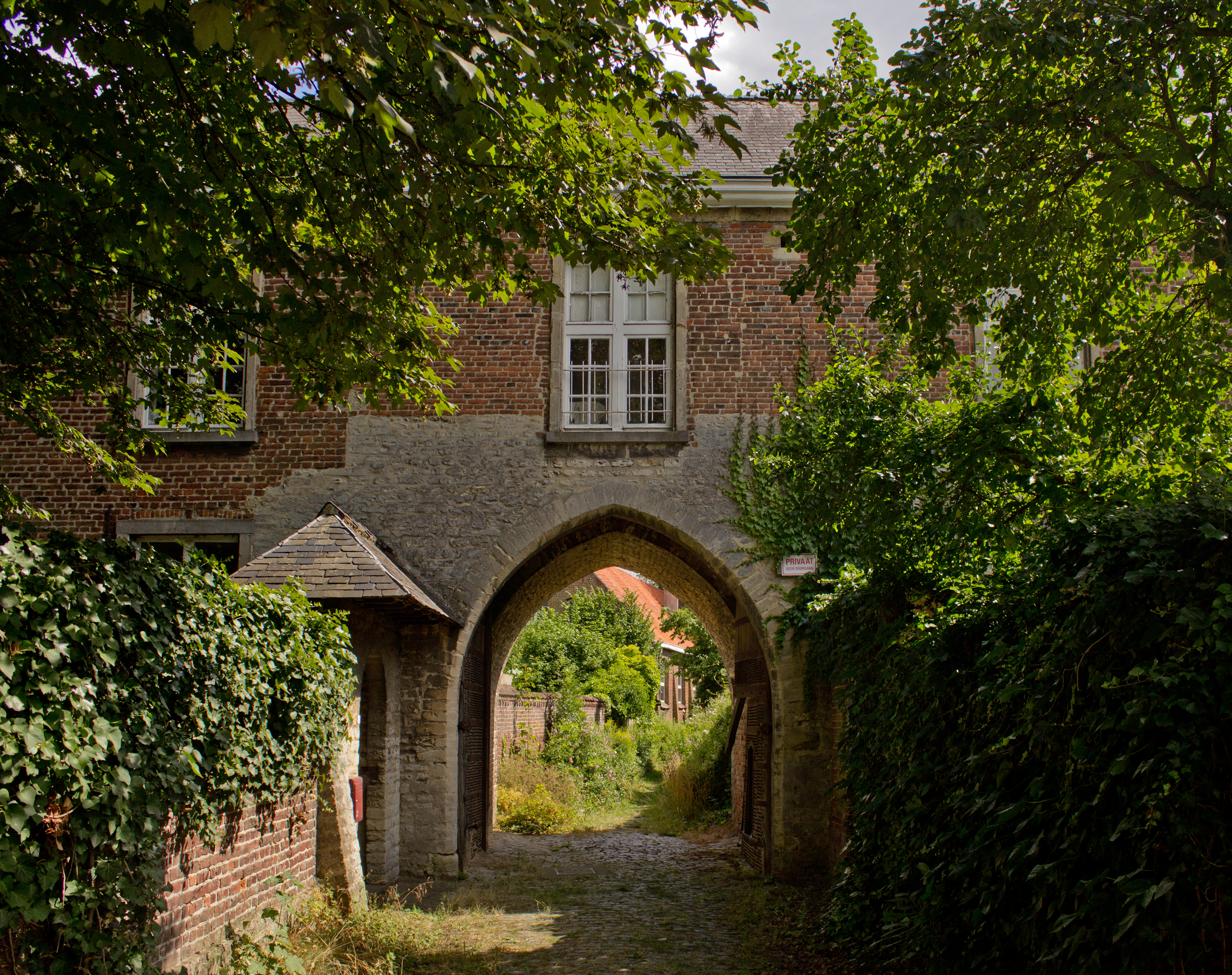
- Gatehouse in Gothic style
- Interactive map of Kortenberg Abbey

Monastery information
- Order: Order of Saint Benedict
- Established: 1095
- Disestablished: 1798

People
- Founder: Godfrey I, Count of Louvain

Architecture
- Functional status: retreat centre
- Heritage designation: protected monument
- Designated date: 2005

Site
- Location: Abdijdreef, Kortenberg, Belgium
- Coordinates: 50°53′08″N 4°32′57″E

Kortenberg Abbey, sometimes referred to as Cortemberg Abbey (founded 1095; suppressed 1798), was a monastery of Benedictine nuns at Kortenberg in the Duchy of Brabant. It is now a diocesan retreat centre under the name OAK: Old Abbey of Kortenberg. Since 2005 the buildings have had the status of a protected monument (number OB001683) under the Flemish organization for Immovable Heritage.

== Foundation ==
The foundation, dating from before 1105 and traditionally dated 1095, was confirmed by Odo of Tournai in 1110.

== Constitutional history ==
The abbey was an important location in the constitutional history of the Duchy of Brabant, as it was where the Charter of Kortenberg was confirmed and where the council met that was instituted to oversee the charter's implementation.

== Tithes dispute ==
In 1129 Burchard, Bishop of Cambrai, awarded the parishes of Leest and Hombeek (now part of the municipality of Mechelen) to the abbey, with all tithes and other benefits. In 1707 the parish priest of Leest began to claim the tithes on newly developed lands in the parish, arguing that these could not have been included in the original donation. The resulting court case went to the highest tribunal in the Austrian Netherlands, the Great Council of Mechelen, with the monastery represented by the noted jurist Zeger Bernhard van Espen.
