= Marie Abts-Ermens =

Belgian seamstress

Marie Abts-Ermens (10 April 1767 in Kortenberg – 11 September 1853 in Brussels) was a Belgian seamstress, best remembered for sewing together the first version of the Flag of Belgium on 26 August 1830.

On May 8, 1802, she married François Abts, a ribbon maker residing at the Grand-Place in Brussels, who was ten years younger than her.

By 1830, the couple owned a haberdashery at the corner of Rue de la Colline and Rue Marché aux Herbes in Brussels. During the Belgian Revolution, while Brussels was in turmoil, Lucien Jottrand and Édouard Ducpétiaux, journalists at Courrier des Pays-Bas, asked Mrs. Abts to make a flag in Brabantian colors (black, yellow, and red). At that time, the flag had horizontal stripes, not vertical ones. On August 26, 1830, this flag replaced the orange cockade of the Dutch monarchy on the façade of the Brussels Town Hall, which had initially been replaced by the French flag as a tribute to the July Revolution.

Marie Abts was 63 years old at the time. Her contribution was immortalized in 1926 by the painter Emile Vermeersch. Two paintings, which dramatizes the scene, are preserved at the Royal Museum of the Armed Forces and Military History and at the Royal Museum of Fine Arts in Brussels. A commemorative plaque is also visible on a building at 85 Rue du Marché aux Herbes, near the Grand-Place in Brussels.
