= Charter of Kortenberg =

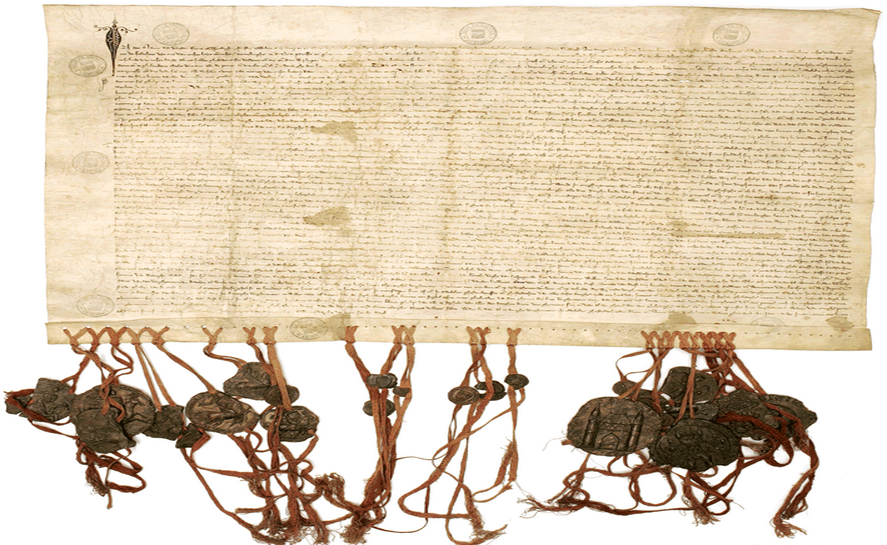
One of the archived originals of the Charter of Kortenberg

The Charter of Kortenberg (Dutch: Keure van Kortenberg) is an agreement signed and sealed on September 27, 1312, in the abbey of Kortenberg by John II, Duke of Brabant and representatives of the cities of Brussels, Antwerp, 's-Hertogenbosch, Tienen and Zoutleeuw. Creation of the document is of historical and political importance because it retains agreements between inhabitants of a territory with a ruler who had absolute power. This reflected the start of a current that would later be labeled by historians as Brabant's Constitutionalism because residents without control had claimed rights and powers, and had them recorded in writing, which are somewhat comparable to what have come to be called civil and political rights centuries later. In this process, the first simple rules were created for what would develop into a legal order that is now called democratic rule of law.

The charter was valid for the entire duchy of Brabant, for the rich and the poor. From this charter originated an early kind of parliament, the "Council of Kortenberg" an assembly of lords.

The control organ, a precursor of the later "Estate assembly" (namely, the first estate was the clergy, the second estate was the nobility, and the third estate was the municipalities) gathered in the Kortenberg Abbey and elsewhere with ups and downs until 1375.

From 1332 on the council was extended by two more members, so that there were 16 Lords; Antwerp got a second member and the Walloon Brabant town of Nivelles (Dutch: Nijvel) also got a member. In 1340 documents were sealed with a special seal on which a tree was planted on a small hill. The seal bore the words "SIGILUM COMMUNE : CONSILII DE CORTENBERGHE" which was the common seal of the Council of Kortenberg.

== Charter of Kortenberg and Magna Carta ==
Although Magna Carta is commonly regarded as the very first charter giving rise to medieval European constitutionalism, the Charter of Kortenberg appears to have been more democratic in nature. This mainly because the beneficiaries of Magna Carta were only the barons while the beneficiaries of the Charter of Kortenberg included all citizens, expressly 'the rich and the poor' (riken ende armen).

Reinforcing this view, the composition of the Council of Kortenberg marks a clear difference with the more 'elitist' Magna Carta. Whilst Magna Carta was to be implemented by a council of 25 barons, the Council of Kortenberg counted four knights and ten townsmen. In the financial commission of August 1314 the nobility were only two with 12 civil representatives of eight towns.

== Follow up ==
A historical line of continuity can be drawn from the Charter of Kortenberg via the Joyous Entries of new Dukes into Flemish and Brabantian towns, the migration of educated citizens in the 16th & 17th century from these towns to the Seven United Provinces as a result of the Eighty Years' War and the stay of some of the Mayflower Pilgrim Fathers in those Provinces, who had fled religious persecution in England for the tolerance of 17th-century Holland in the Netherlands. One group moved to the city of Leiden and was living there for two decades, prior to their departure for America. Some worked or studied at Leiden University.

Coupled with the enduring influence of New Netherlander society upon early American political life, the emphasis placed by American historians and the general public opinion upon the constitutive nature of Magna Carta for the American constitution and the American Dream seems too narrow if no mention is made from the Charter of Kortenberg all following Brabantian constitutional charters and the Act of Abjuration (1581), dubbed the Dutch Declaration of Independence.

== Modern translation of the charter of Kortenberg ==
We, duke John II of Brabant, agree

1. That no other demands or taxes be levied than those which are known as the three feudal cases:
  - at the knighthood of my son
  - the wedding of my daughter
  - and if I should be taken captive
  The taxes will be reasonable (fiscal prerogative)
2. An honourable jurisdiction for rich and poor (judicial prerogative),
3. To recognise the freedom of our good towns (municipal prerogative),
4. To establish a council which shall be comprised (sic) of:
  - 4 knights or nobles.
  - 10 representatives from the 5 cities as follows:
    - 3 from Leuven
    - 3 from Brussels
    - 1 from Antwerp
    - 1 from 's-Hertogenbosch (nowadays in North Brabant, Netherlands)
    - 1 from Tienen
    - 1 from Zoutleeuw
5. This council be allowed to meet at Kortenberg in the Abbey. It will meet every 3 weeks to monitor whether the financial, judicial and municipal prerogatives are observed.
6. That in the future improvements are introduced to the administration of the land by the council.
7. That upon the death of members of the Council of Kortenberg, new members be designated.
8. That the members of the Council take an oath on the Holy Gospel that they will pursue the best interests of the public.
9. That the people have the right to resist should the Duke or his descendants refuse to observe the Charter of Kortenberg.
