= Everberg =

- Deelgemeente
- Interactive map of Everberg
- Coordinates: 50°52′42″N 4°34′13″E
- Country: Belgium
- Province: Flemish Brabant
- Municipality: Kortenberg

Area
  - Total: 9.25 km^{2} (3.57 sq mi)
- Elevation: 25–100 m (82–328 ft)

Population (2006)
  - Total: 3,882
  - Density: 420/km^{2} (1,100/sq mi)
- Source: NIS
- Postal code: 3078
- Area code: 02-016

Everberg is a town in the Belgian province Flemish Brabant and is part of the municipality of Kortenberg. The territory covers an area of 925 ha. The neighbouring towns or municipalities are Leefdaal, Kortenberg, Erps-Kwerps, Meerbeek, Sterrebeek, Moorsel and Tervuren. A small hamlet, called Vrebos, can also be found in Everberg.

== History ==
During the Roman era an important Roman road Bruges-Cologne ran through Everberg. Countless implements have been found on this Roman road.

The earliest records on Everberg are dated from a charter from the year 1112. Everberg was spelled as Eversberg. In this document from 1112 it is mentioned that Bishop Odo of Cambrai donated the altar (altare) of Everberg to the Xenodochium or the Guesthouse (Gasthuis) of Leuven. The patron of the church, Saint Martin, is a reference to the old age of the church of Everberg, which certainly goes back to the 8th century. According to some, Everberg would have been the main parish of the area, from which other parishes have been founded.

The Guesthouse of Leuven was established by Henry III, Count of Louvain (1079-1095). This Guesthouse received the tithes of Everberg. In the following centuries, Everberg was described "as the pantry of the Guesthouse of Leuven". The act of 1112 is the oldest act of the Guesthouse. The Mistress of the Guesthouse had the right to propose the priest of Everberg. Initially, the priests were appointed by the Bishop of Cambrai, later on by the Bishop of Mechelen. The Guesthouse gained its income from the church and from the tithes in Everberg. They were also responsible for the repairs of the church and the presbytery. The tithes were collected in a tithe barn, which was the large barn of the Guesthouse's courtyard. The priest of Everberg received some compensation or an annual salary.

At the church itself two chapels (or altars) were connected, the Chapel of Souls (Zielenkapelanij) and the Chapel of Saint John and Our Lady. At the end of the 19th century, the church dedication was expanded to Saint Martin and Saint Ludovicus. The latter was the patron saint of count Louis de Mérode, who donated significant sums for restoration of the church by H. Beyaert and Hankas.

== Places of interest ==
=== de Merode Castle ===
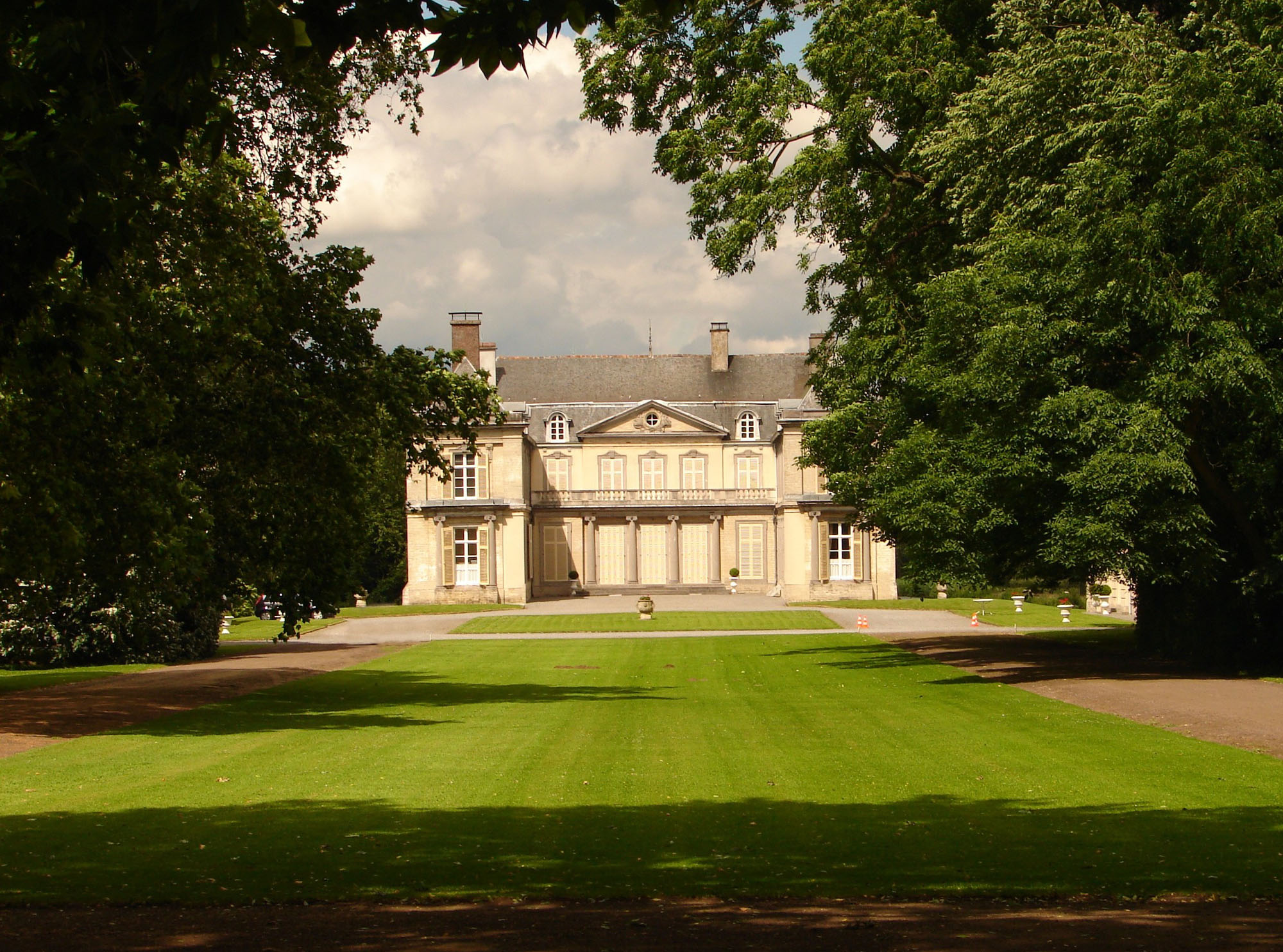
de Merode Castle

The de Merode castle is a reconstruction of the court of Montenaken. The court of Montenaken was only about a few hundred meters away from the castle. The de Merode castle was built in the 16th century and contains three separate buildings: the residence, a building for the animals and a building for employees and the stabling of the carriages. When Louise-Brigitte married Filips-Frans de Merode, the castle became property of the de Merode family. The influences of the family de Merode were of great significance among other things because they managed a large part of the forest and the estates (which they still do) and participated in church and administrative policy in the village. On this day the family de Merode still lives in the castle. The domain is regarded as private property, among the surrounding forest.

=== Gamekeeper's House ===
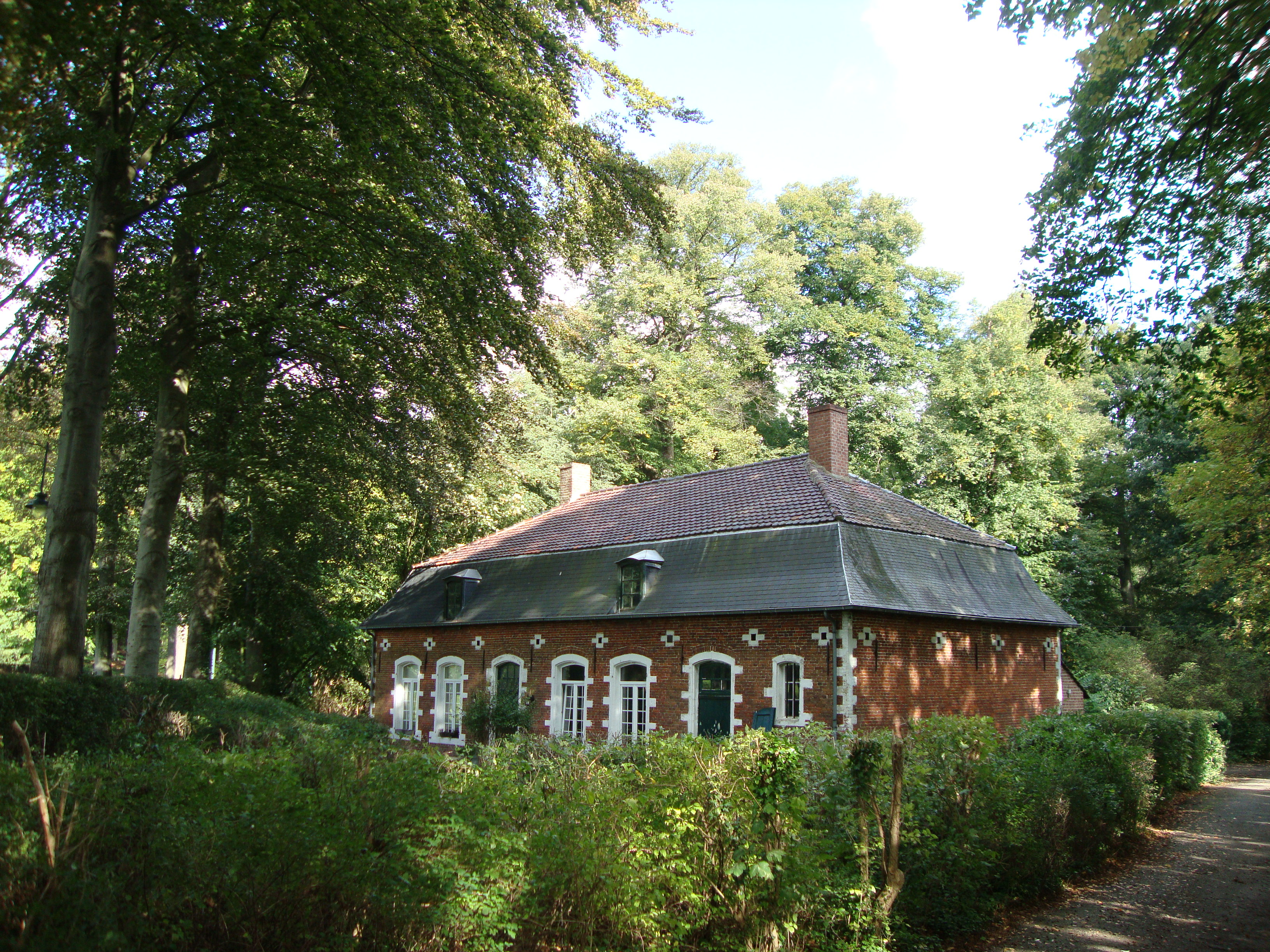
Gamekeeper's House

The gamekeeper's house lies alongside the cobbled Princes Lane (Prinsendreef) in Everberg and was built around 1770. The house was more familiar as the New Hostel (Nieuwe herbergh). This house was rented. Art historians described it as an 18th-century house in provincial regency style. In the end of the 19th century the house became the gamekeeper's house of de Merode Castle. The latter is the owner of the house as well. The gamekeeper's house is known in Everberg as the previous house of 'Jef van Vinus' or Jozef Meersman, who was the actual gamekeeper. Today this house is uninhabited.

=== St. Martin's Church ===
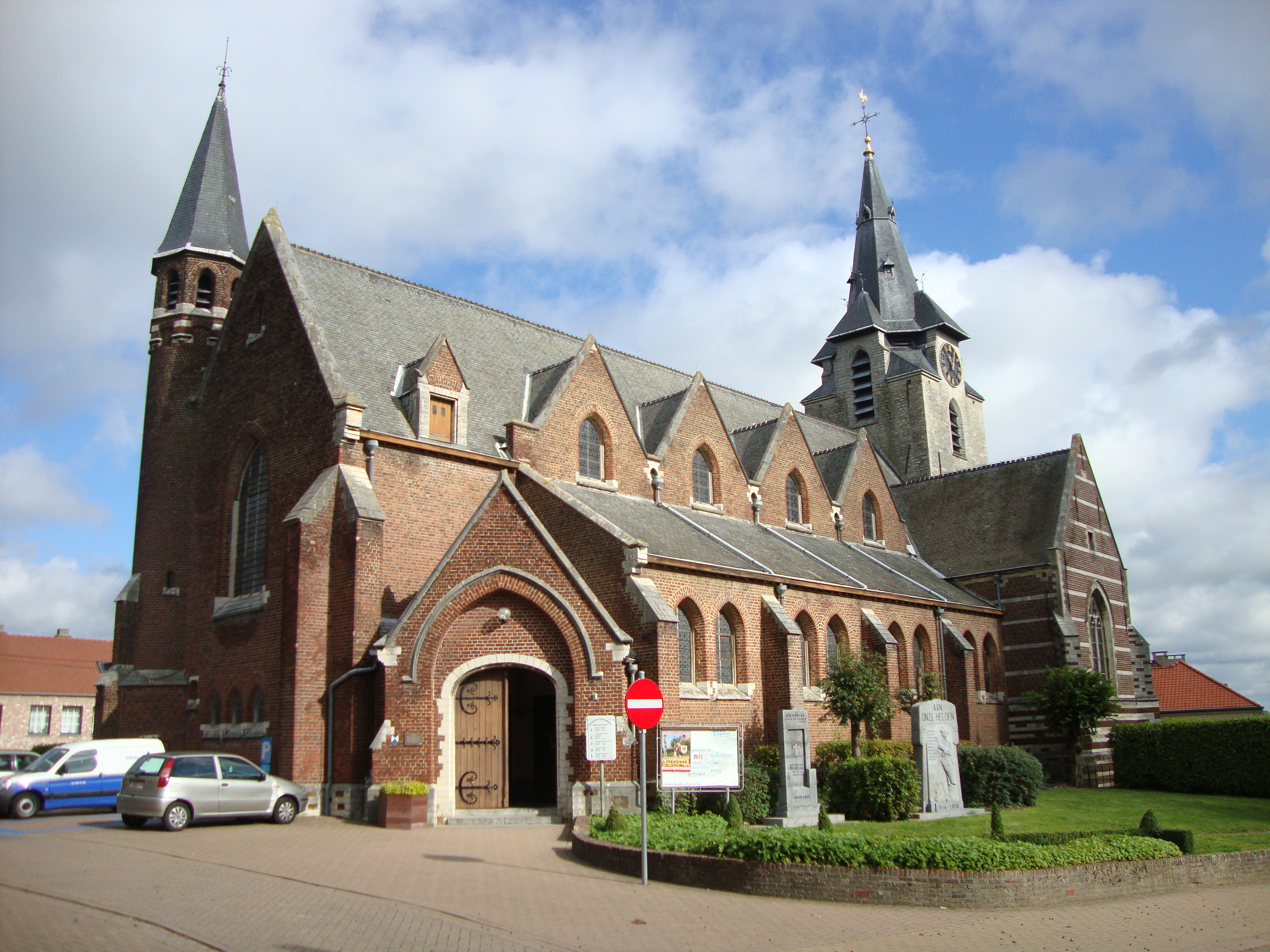
Saint Martin of Tours Church

The church of Saint Martin of Tours was originally built in Romanesque style. The lower part of the tower is the proof of that. The church was, as most churches, a place of prayer for the local community. The church was therefore a community church, not an independent church or court church. St. Martin's church can be found in the center of Everberg. In the church itself a relic shrine of Saint Martin has its own place. In the 14th century a Late Gothic choir with Brabant buttresses and the northern transept with the Our Lady Chapel, has been added. During the 17th century, the upper part of the tower was rebuilt. In 1773, plans were made by J.B. De Ronde to enlarge the church, but these were never executed. The church was in a disastrous condition during the 19th century. Countess Louise de Merode, sister-in-law of Count Amaury de Merode, donated 71.000 Belgian francs in 1881 to make a restoration possible. The new church was finished in 1893. The actual construction was executed under supervision of Paul Hankar and Hendrik Beyaert, the architects.

=== Biest Court ===
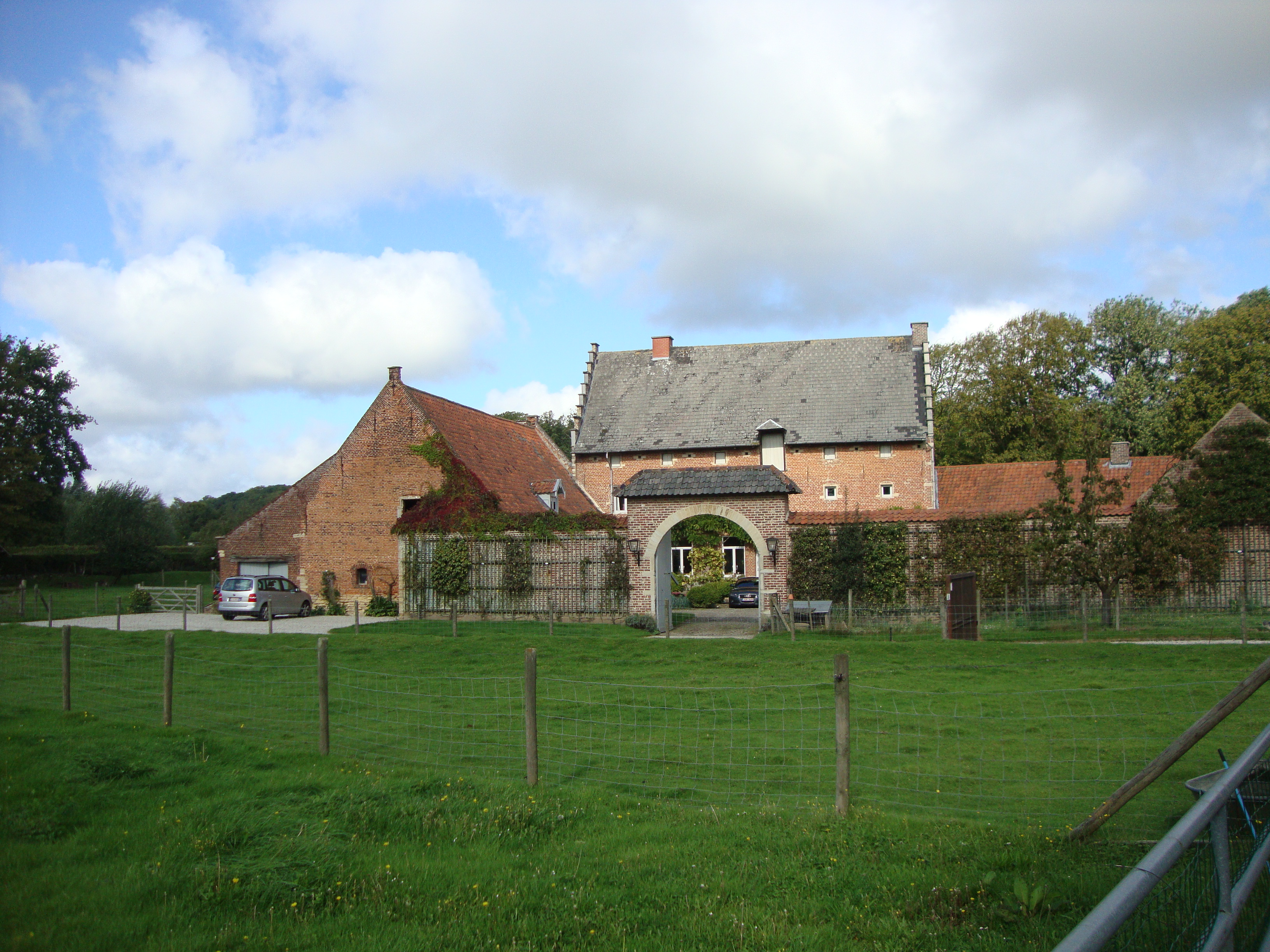
Biest Court Farmstead

The farmstead, Biest Court (Dutch: Biesthof), is located on the corner of the roads Steenhofstraat and Bankstraat. For years it was the castle farmstead of the de Merode Castle. A 'biest' was a place where grass-like rushes grew, a moist piece of land or puddle. This farmstead was built adjacent to such a biest. Originally, it contained two residences which have been put together in the 14th century. Above the entrance, the number 1647 is mentioned, which refers to the construction year of the farmstead as we know it today. At the end of the 17th century, the Princes de Rubempré got hold of the ownership. During the 19th century, two mayors used to live there and it even was a free school for a certain time. More recently, a number restoration works have been executed. Today the Biest Court continues being a farmstead.

=== van Grave Court ===
In 1564, a play house or little castle was located in the Kwikstraat (name of a local road): the van Grave Court (Dutch: Hof van Grave). The van Grave family (or 'de Grez' family) has always been an important noble family, starting during the Middle Ages. Maria-Anna van Grave married Juste-Philibert de Spangen, Baron of Herent. By inheritance, the Counts de Gage and the van der Linden family, Barons d'Hoogvorst, became the rightful owners of the castle. At the end of the 18th century, the building was property of Nicolas Blairon from Frameries in Hainaut. He established a school out of it. In 1886, Jan-Baptist Jossa ‘Tiske de Scheper now settled himself in this homestead. He tended his own sheep, and the sheep of de Merode Castle. The 16th century play house was restorated and was made into a house for two families.

== Education ==
One of the four municipal schools, De Negensprong in Kortenberg is located in Everberg. It has a kindergarten and also offers primary education.

== Business ==
=== International ===
One of the world's largest chemical companies, Huntsman Corporation, had its own site in Everberg. The site covers an area of 31 hectares, of which 15 hectares are occupied by office buildings for Huntsman Polyurethanes. The woodland is open for the people of the local community. The Everberg site was shared by Huntsman Advanced Materials, Huntsman Performance Products, Huntsman Polyurethanes and Huntsman Textile Effects. The Polyurethanes activities on the site included: administration, sales, research and development and small-scale production testing. However, in 2023, they left the location and partly relocated to Tienen. The investment company Bremhove bought the site, to convert it to a place where startups can put down their offices. The start-up Result X, also from Bremhove, is the first to take some of the buildings in use in 2025.

A British (Norfolk) business called Stonemanor is situated in Everberg and is dedicated to the import of British products in Belgium. This mainly for serving the large expatriate community in the area around Brussels. The store is part of the Costcutter group since 1992.

== Trivia ==
- In Everberg, a federal facility for youth delinquents, 'de Grubbe', has been established.
- The Belgian d'Everberg is a local breed of chicken.
- The village has a local beer, called Flurk, previously named Flurk 900. The beer was launched in the year that the village celebrated its 900 years of existence. As of April 2017, a new beer will be launched, called Flurk Hopper.

== Gallery ==
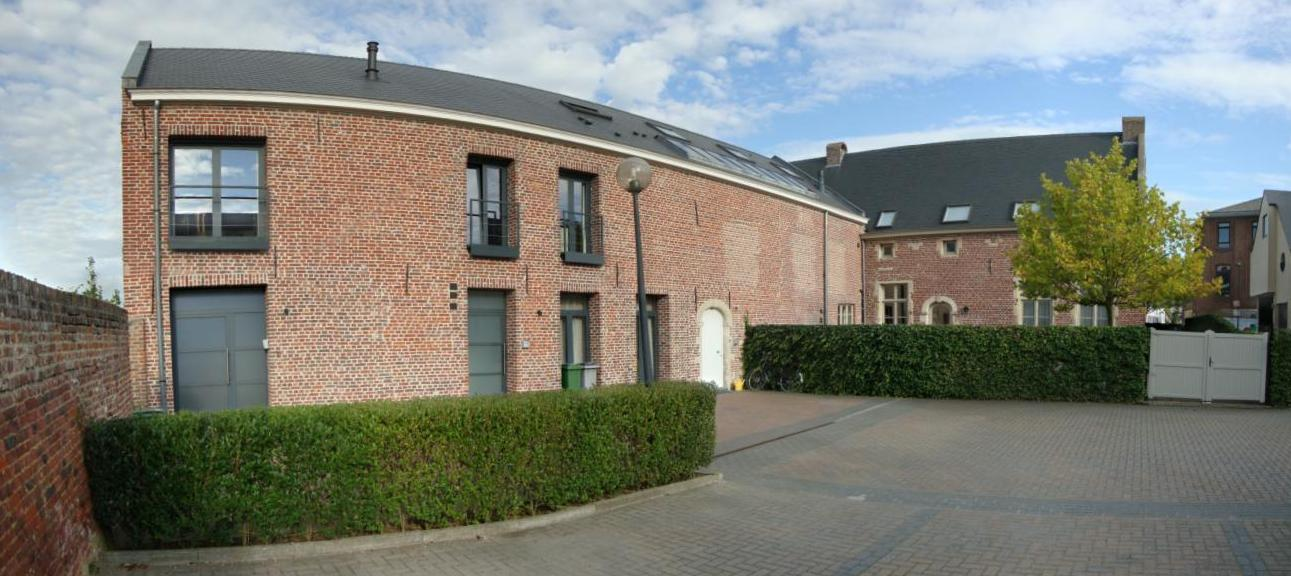
Large farm from the 17th and 18th centuries

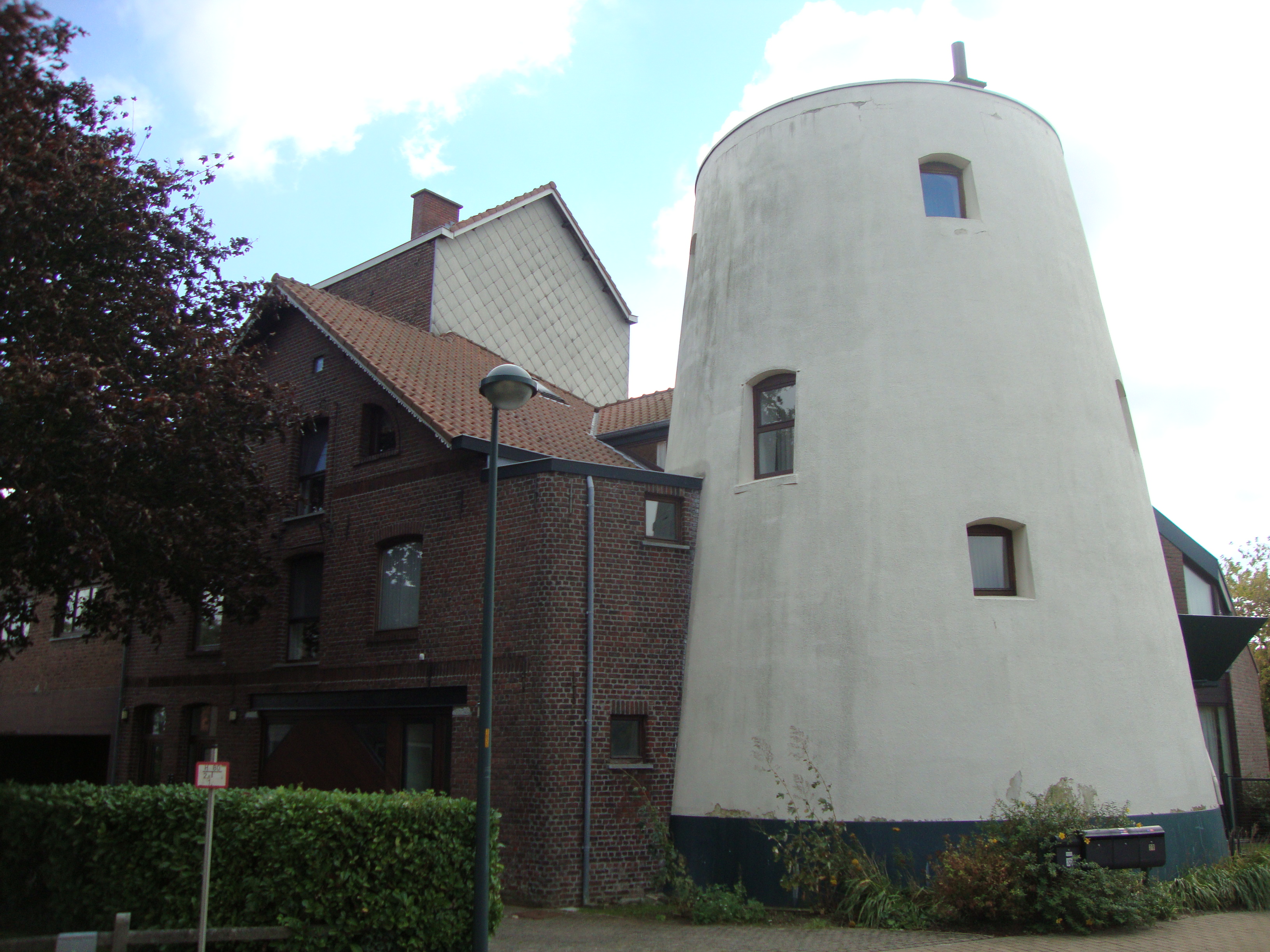
Windmill from the 19th century

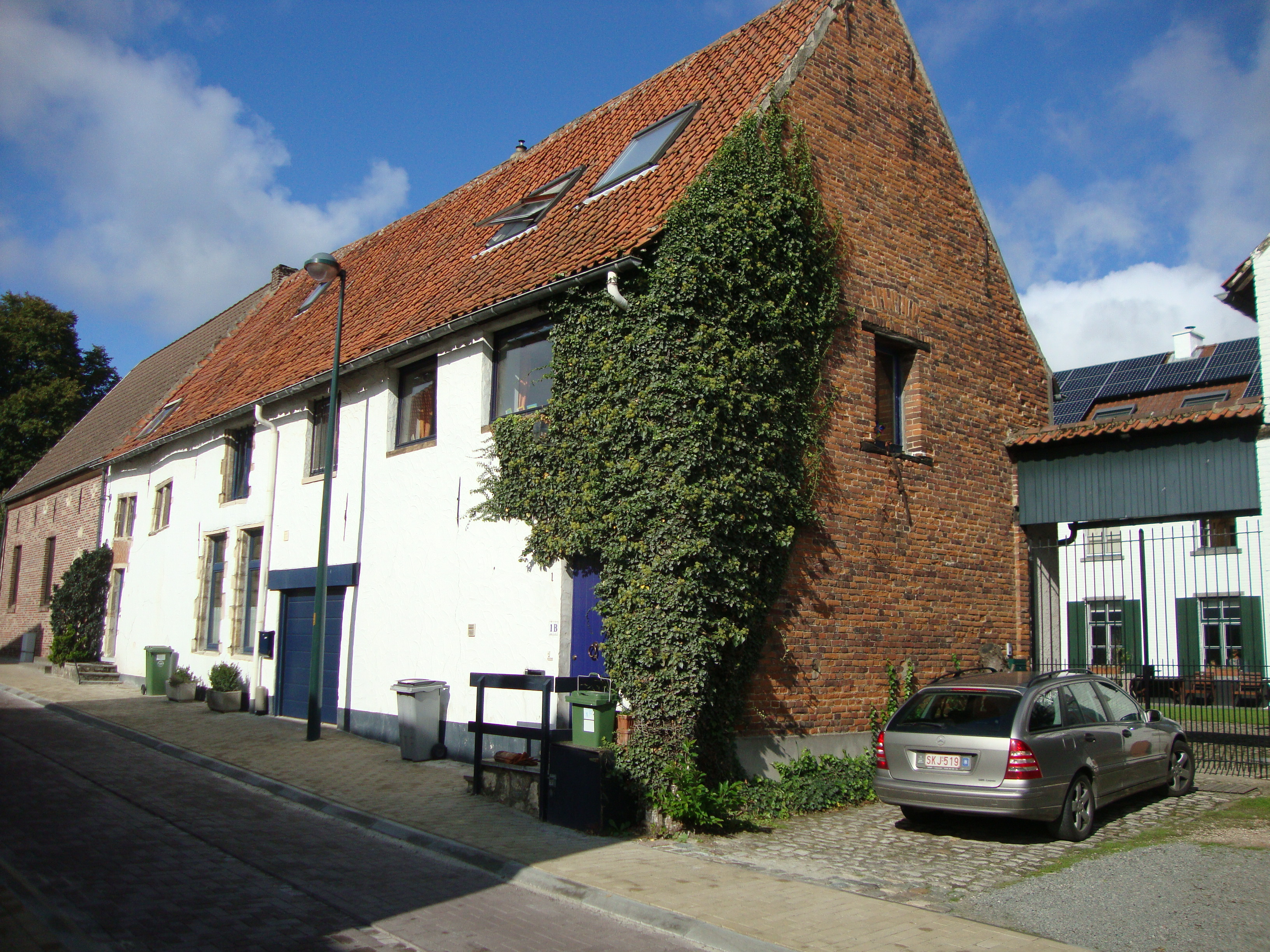
Farmhouse dated from 1628

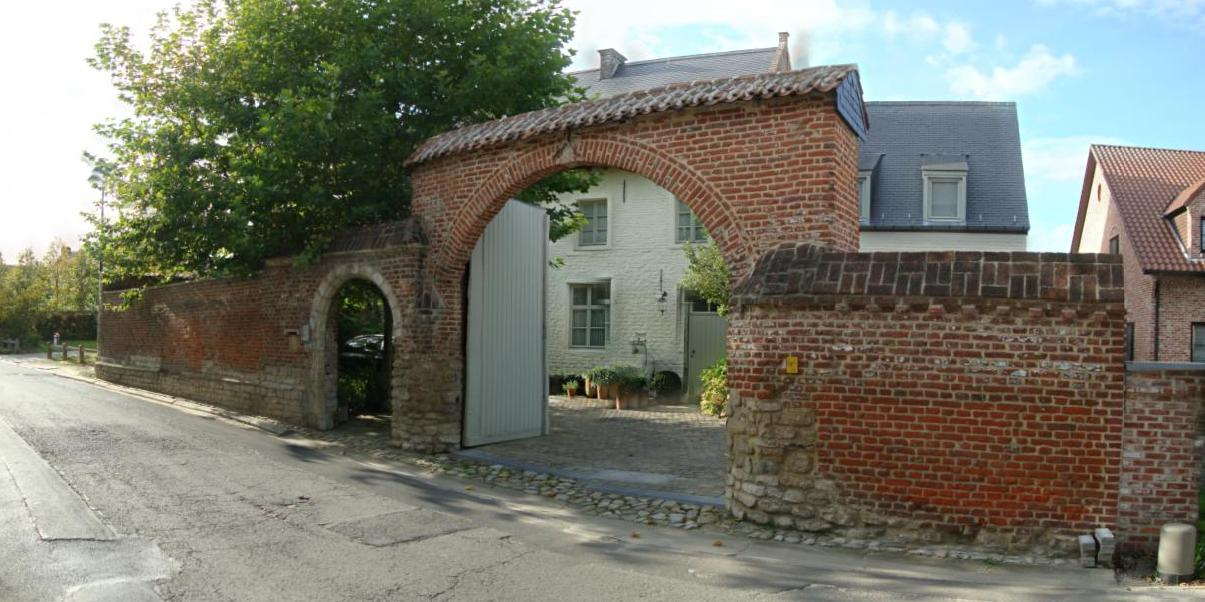
Long House with gable roof and two floors of the 18th century

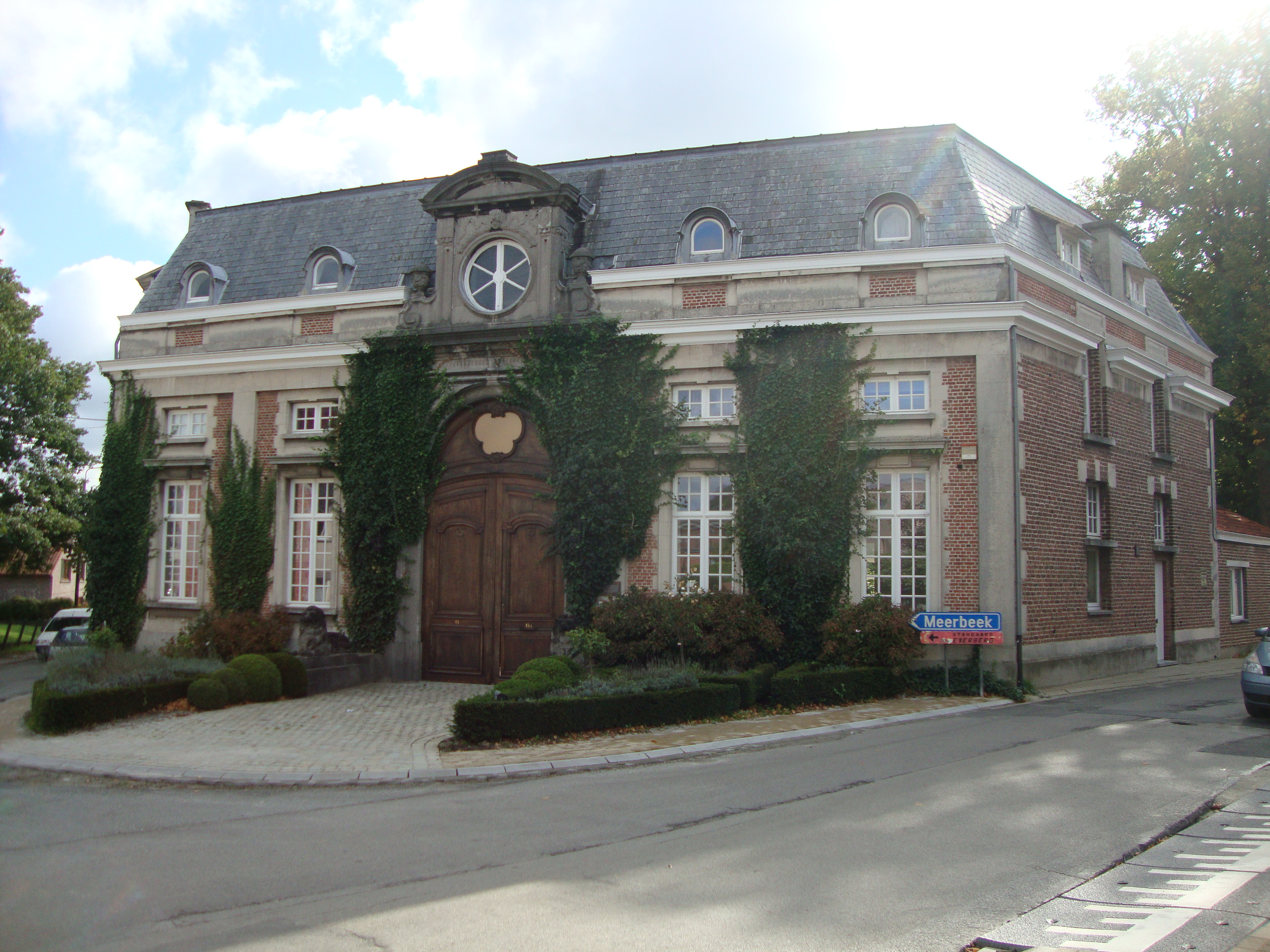
Gatehouse flanked by outbuildings and farmhouse from the 19th century

Coat of arms of Kortenberg
