= Meerbeek =

- Deelgemeente
- Interactive map of Meerbeek
- Coordinates: 50°52′56″N 4°35′08″E
- Country: Belgium
- Province: Belgian province Flemish Brabant
- Municipality: Kortenberg

Area
  - Total: 5.15 km^{2} (1.99 sq mi)

Population (2006)
  - Total: 2,188
  - Density: 425/km^{2} (1,100/sq mi)
- Source: NIS
- Postal code: 3078
- Area code: 02 - 016

Meerbeek is a village in the Belgian province of Flemish Brabant and is the part of the municipality of Kortenberg, along with Everberg, Erps-Kwerps and Kortenberg. The village borders the villages of Veltem-Beisem (Herent), Bertem, Erps-Kwerps and Everberg. The area comprises 515 ha.

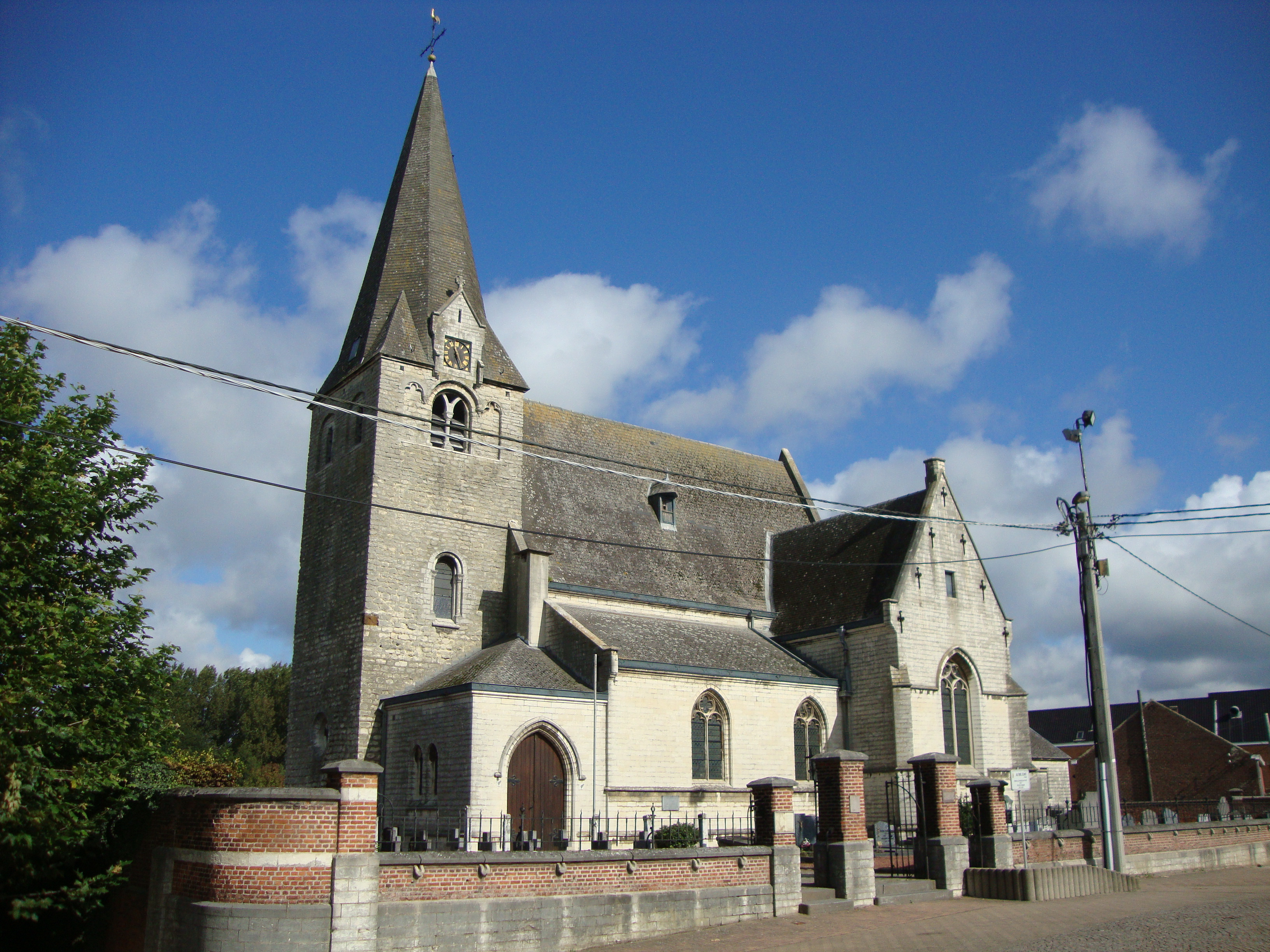
Saint Anthony Church from the 13th century

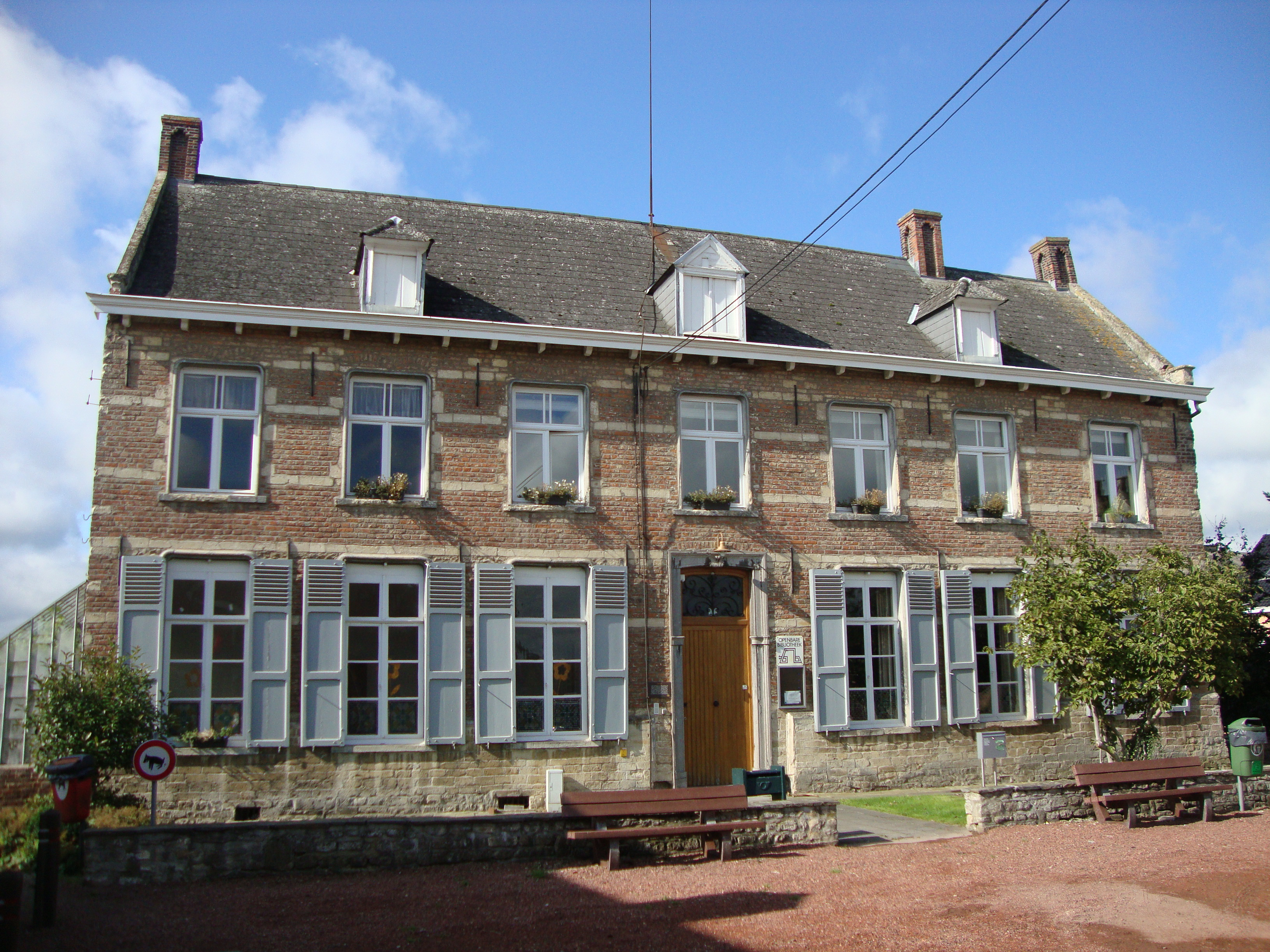
17th century rectory built out of brick and sandstone core
