= Erps-Kwerps =

Village in Kortenberg, Belgium

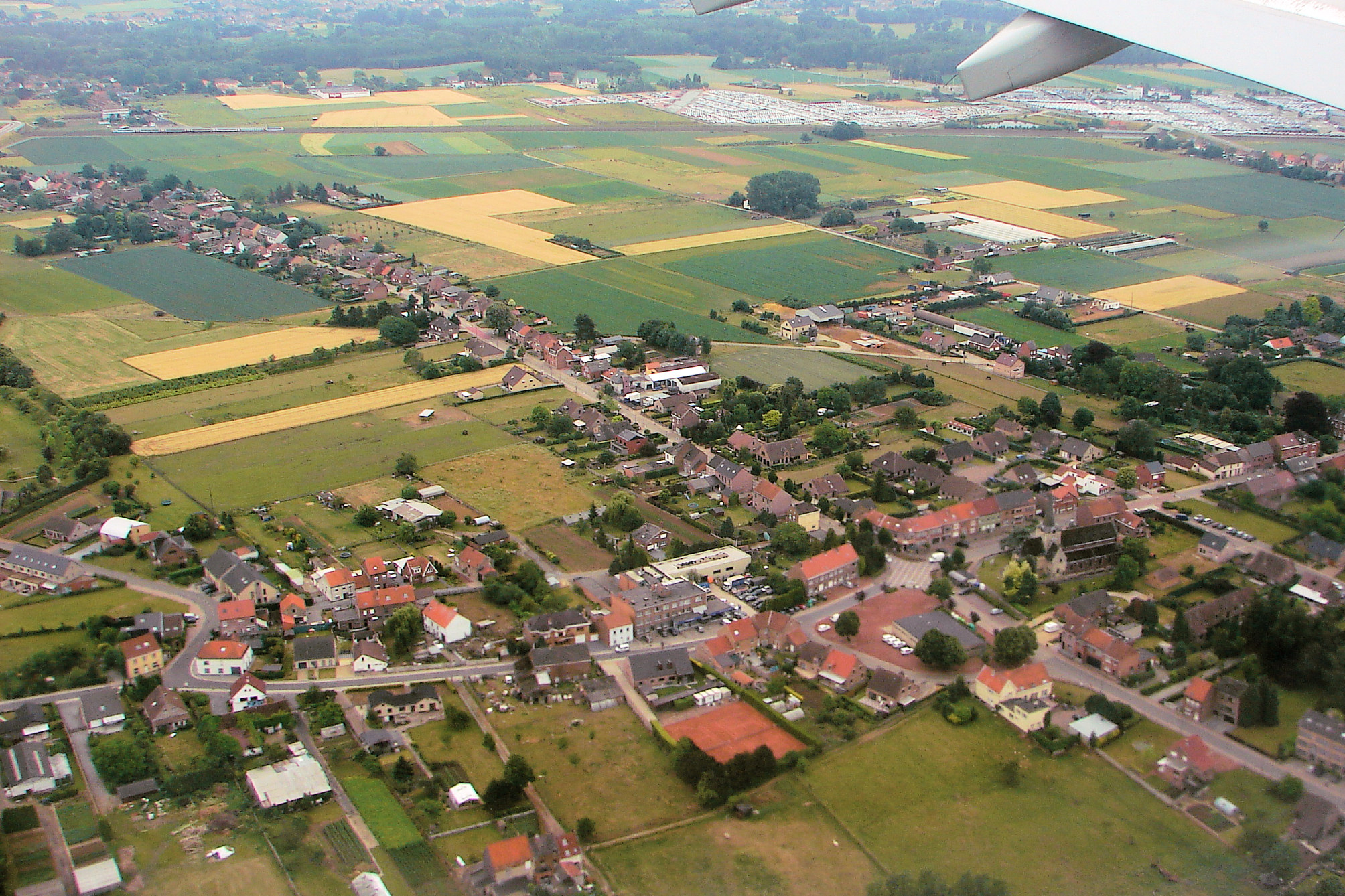
Aerial view of Erps-Kwerps

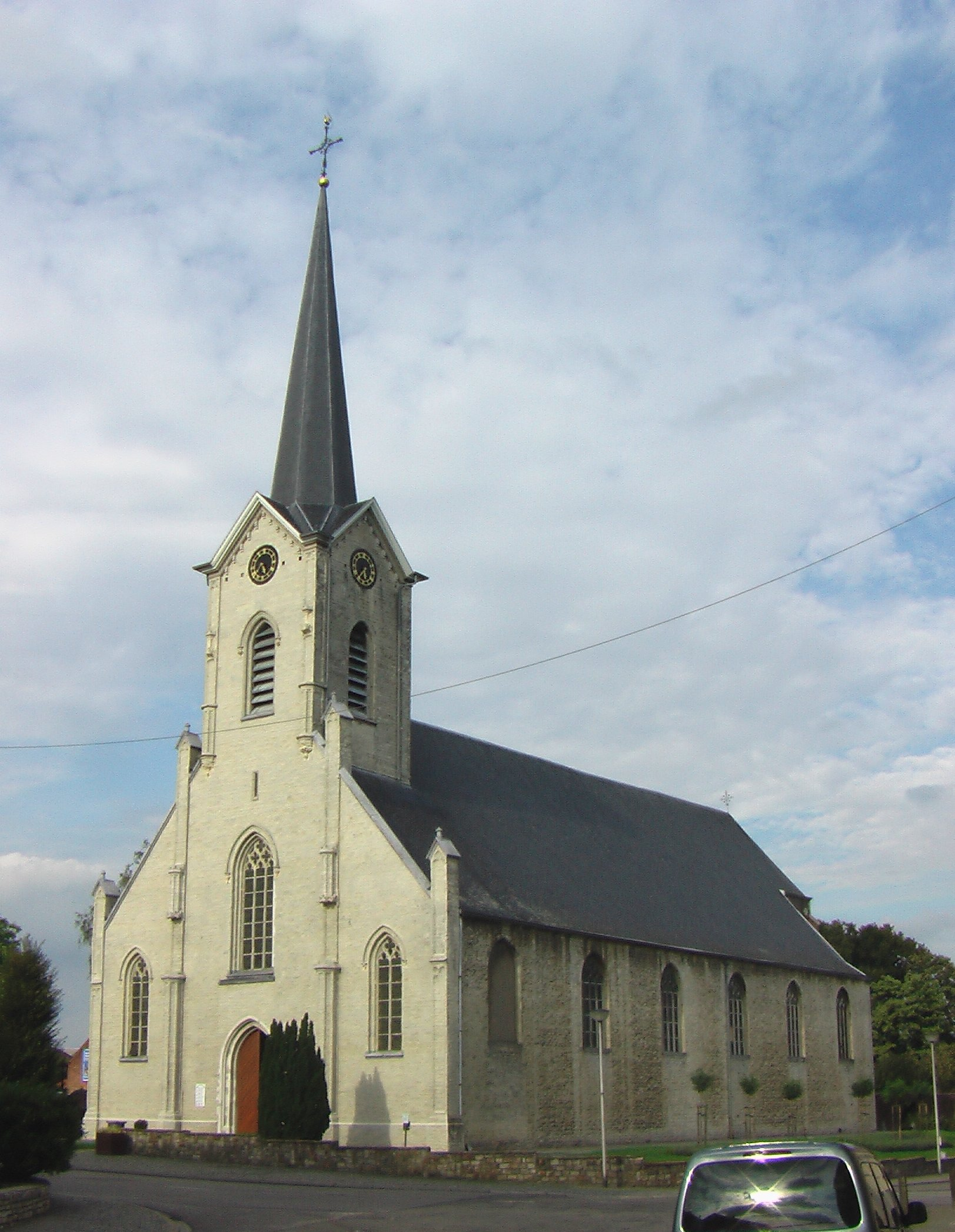
Church of the Erps parish (1864)

Erps-Kwerps is a village in the Belgian Province of Flemish Brabant and a sub-municipality of Kortenberg. It has an area of 15.94 km^{2}.

== Geography ==
Neighbouring places are Nederokkerzeel (municipality of Kampenhout), Kortenberg, Veltem-Beisem (municipality of Herent), Meerbeek and Everberg.

== Location ==
The village is situated on the prolongation of the runway 07R/25L of the Brussels Airport. Its geographical coordinates are 50°54′N 4°34′E.

== Farming in the region ==
Since it is located within the fertile Central Plateau of the Province of Brabant it is also part of the so-called "Brabantse Groentenstreek", the "Brabant vegetable region". The main cultivation product is Belgian endives.

== Parishes ==
Two parishes exist in Erps-Kwerps, Erps and Kwerps, each having its own church. The church of Erps is named after Saint Amand and the church of Kwerps after Saint Peter. The latter owns a choir of the seventeenth century and a tower of the late Romanesque period. The old town hall at the town square (Dorpsplein) of Erps was built in 1875 after the design of Alexander Van Arenbergh of Leuven.

== Transportation ==
Erps-Kwerps is connected to the railway Brussels - Liège (line 36, HSL 2). The railway station is 2 km from the town centre.
