= Kortenberg =

- Municipality
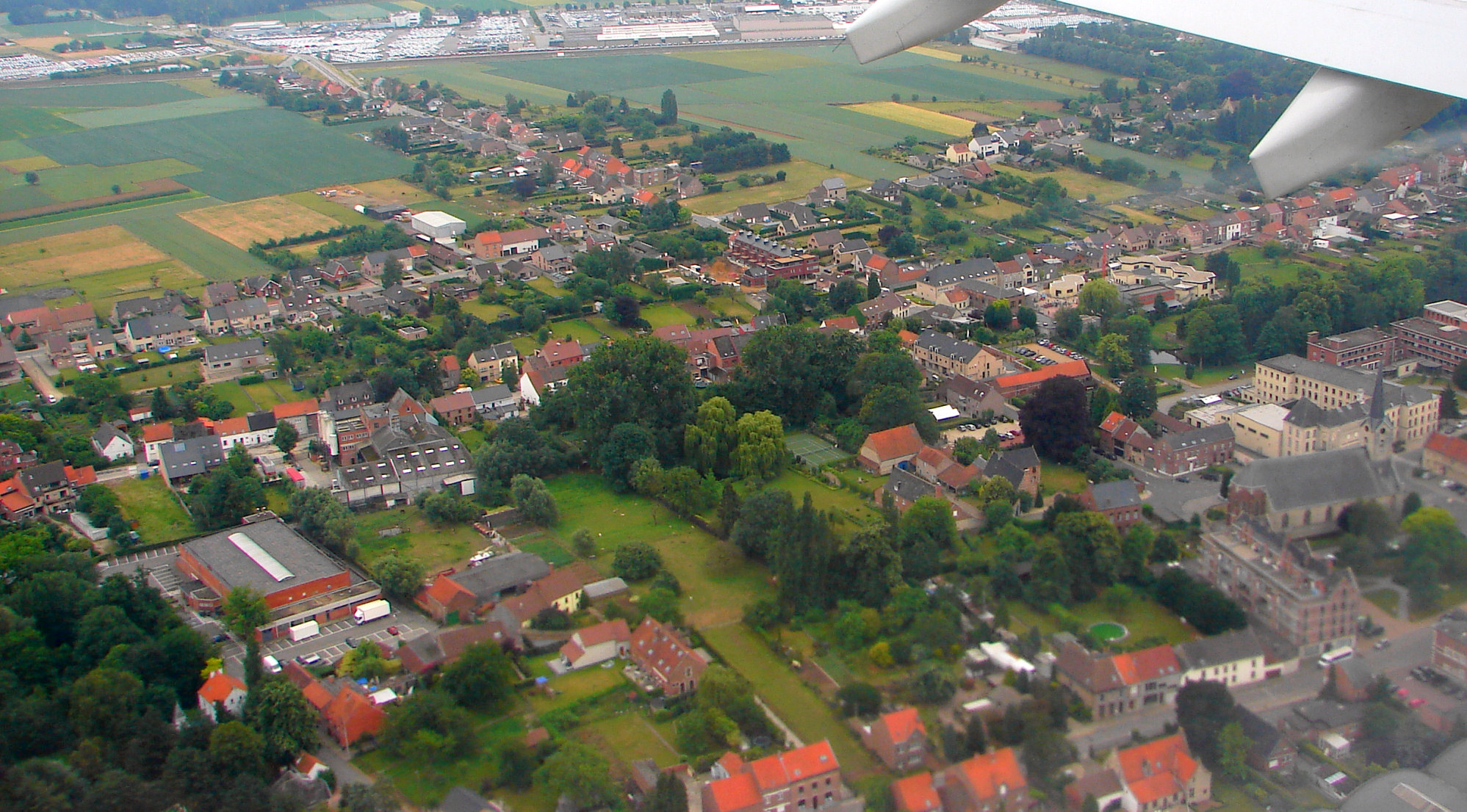
- Erps-Kwerps

- Flag Coat of arms

- Location of Kortenberg in Flemish Brabant
- Interactive map of Kortenberg
- Location in Belgium
- Coordinates: 50°53′N 04°32′E
- Country: Belgium
- Community: Flemish Community
- Region: Flemish Region
- Province: Flemish Brabant
- Arrondissement: Leuven

Government
  - Mayor: Alexandra Thienpont (CD&V)
  - Governing parties: CD&V, Open VLD

Area
  - Total: 34.7 km^{2} (13.4 sq mi)

Population (2018-01-01)
  - Total: 20,214
  - Density: 583/km^{2} (1,510/sq mi)
- Postal codes: 3070, 3071, 3078
- NIS code: 24055
- Area codes: 02, 016
- Website: www.kortenberg.be

Kortenberg (Dutch pronunciation: [ˈkɔrtə(m)bɛr(ə)x]; French: Cortenbergh) is a Belgian municipality located in the province of Flemish Brabant, about halfway between the cities of Brussels and Leuven. The municipality comprises the subdivisions or deelgemeenten of Erps-Kwerps, Everberg, Kortenberg proper and Meerbeek. On 1 January 2013 Kortenberg had a total population of 19,393. The total area is 34.52 km^{2} which gives a population density of about 562 inhabitants per km^{2}. In the southern part of Everberg there is also a hamlet called Vrebos, while between Erps-Kwerps and Meerbeek there is another hamlet called Schoonaarde, which can be found in the proximity of the train station of Erps-Kwerps.

== History ==
On the territory of Erps-Kwerps an ancient Roman villa has been excavated. The same archeological site revealed a burial-ground of the Frankish civilisation.

In 1095, Gualgericus, Bishop of Cambrai, acknowledged the existence of a religious community on the Curtenbergh (meaning 'short hill'). For this reason, 1095 has been accepted as the founding year of Kortenberg. The conventuals moved in 1222 from the hill (the 'Curtenbergh') to lower grounds at the Minneveld, where the Abbey of Kortenberg still exists on this day.

From these early days, the Lords of Cortenberg lived in this village. They were of great significance in the history of the duchy of Brabant. The formerly independent municipality of Erps had the main bailiwick in the area since 1286.

The construction of a paved road from 1706 until 1709 was an important event in the growth of the municipality, together with the construction of a railroad in 1866. In the end of the nineteenth century the new bourgeoisie built a whole range of new residences in the style of the Belle Epoque with the typical spires.

On 27 August 1914 German troops put a local brewery, some residences and a little castle on fire while invading Kortenberg.

== Abbey of Kortenberg ==
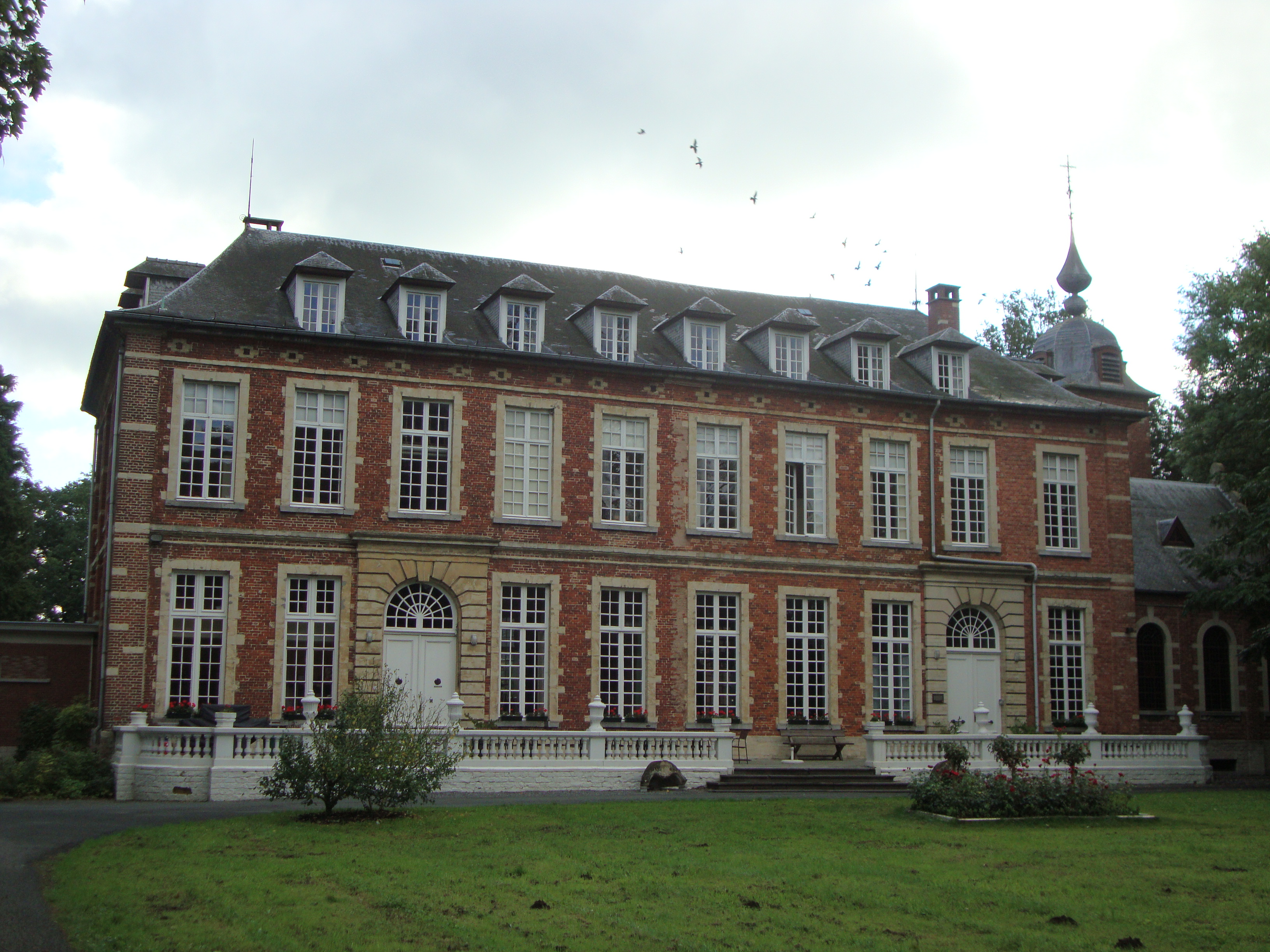
Women Benedictine Abbey

There has been a Benedictine abbey in Kortenberg since 1222. In 1312, John II, Duke of Brabant signed the Charter of Kortenberg in the abbey, thereby establishing a constitution for the entire Duchy of Brabant and granting powers to a precursory democratic institution. After the Magna Carta, it is the second document in western history to limit the powers of monarchs in favour of a number of civil freedoms.

The abbey has a stirring history of arson, plundering and reconstruction. The oldest still remaining parts are the gate building with the gothic spired gate from the early seventeenth century, the Cattle Courtyard (Veehof) from 1650, the lease courtyard, the Brewery from 1732, and the abbey castle which was built from 1779 until 1783. The traditional great hall and the baroque chapel are dated from 1934. The abbey, which is owned by the diocese, became a protected monument on 14 February 2005 as part of resolution made by the Flemish government. The Old Abbey Kortenberg is a center of contemplation. Today, the grounds have been opened to the public as a park for recreational use.

== Transportation ==
The municipality is crossed by the highway A3/E40 (Brussels-Liège). Although the territory contains a parking lot adjacent to this highway, it doesn't have any access or exit roads. It lies between exit 21 (Sterrebeek) and exit 22 (Bertem). The main secondary road is the N2, which connects Brussels with Leuven.

Kortenberg has a train station which lies on the line Brussels-Liège (line 36). Also, the town of Erps-Kwerps has its own train station on that same line.Both are served by the national rail company SNCB.

Train services:

- S2 - Braine-le-Comte to Leuven via Brussels South station. Operates twice an hour except in the early morning, late at night and on Sundays. Also stops in Erps-Kwerps station
- S9 - Nivelles to Landen via Brussels Schuman station. Operates once an hour on weekdays only.

A network of public transport via buses is maintained by the Flemish bus service company De Lijn.

Bus services:

- R90 (Brussels (North) - Kortenberg - Leuven);
- 91 (Brussels Airport - Kortenberg - Everberg - Leuven);
- R92 (Kraainem metro - Kortenberg - Erps-Kwerps - Leuven);
- 225 (Kortenberg - Vilvoorde);
- 318 (Leuven - Vrebos - Brussels);
- 271 (Brussels - Erps-Kwerps - Kampenhout);
- 516 (School bus to Haacht);
- 521 (School bus to Heverlee via Everberg and Meerbeek);
- 522 (School bus to Heverlee via Erps-Kwerps);
- 523 (School bus to Heverlee via Winksele);
- 528 (School bus from Veltem to Tervuren via Kortenberg)
- 530 (School bus to Zaventem)
- 576 (School bus to Leuven)
- N3 (Nightbus Lubbeek-Leuven-Kortenberg)
- N4 (Nightbus Aarschot-Leuven-Kortenberg)

== Education ==
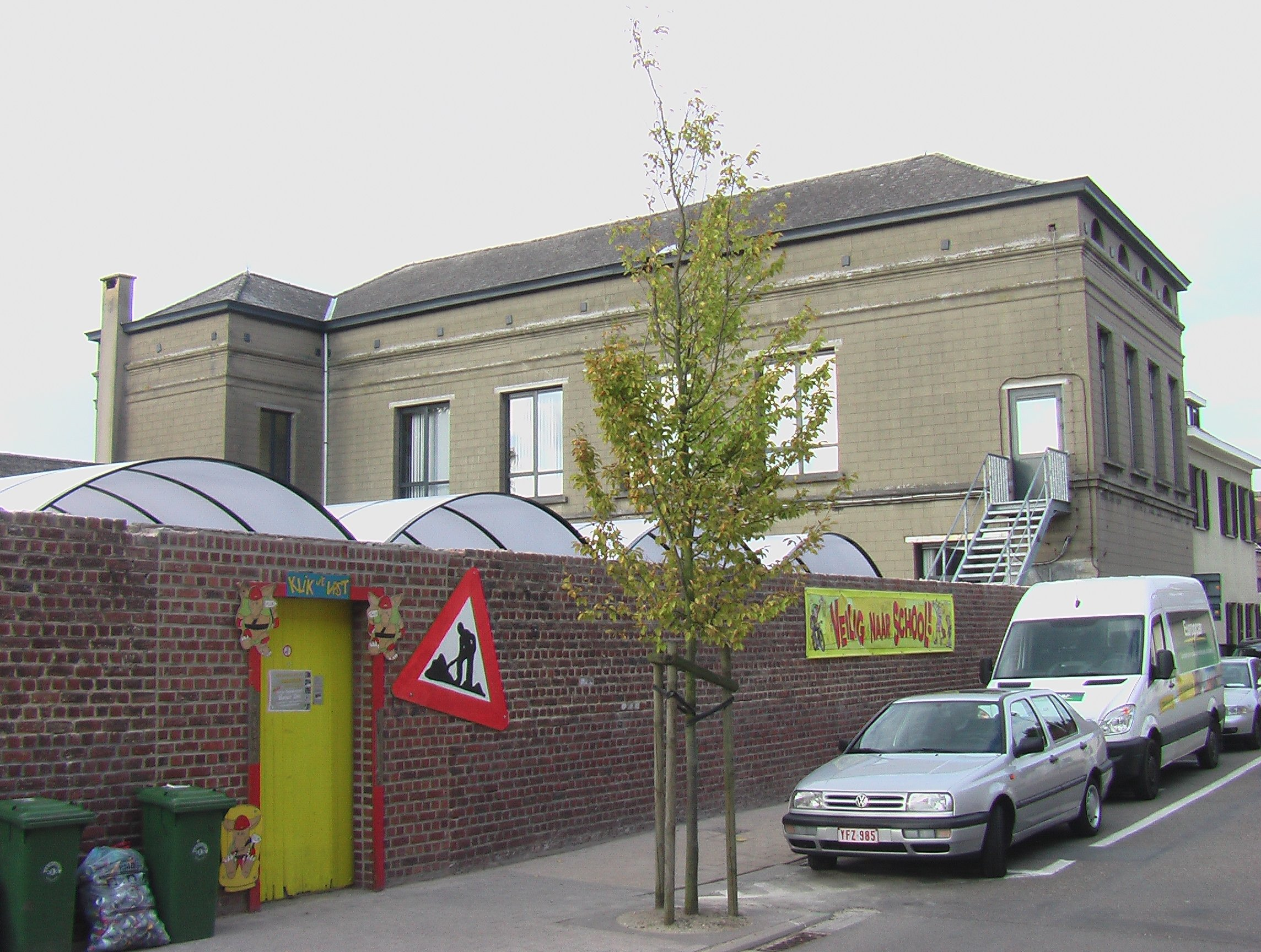
Mater Dei Free Elementary School in Erps-Kwerps, built end 19th century

The municipality organizes primary education in all of the four towns:

- De Klimop in Erps-Kwerps
- De Negensprong in Everberg
- De Regenboog in Kortenberg
- De Boemerang in Meerbeek

The oldest existing school in Kortenberg is the primary school Mater Dei in the town of Erps-Kwerps. The Flemish Community also organizes educational facilities in the community primary school Hertog-Jan. Secondary schools are mostly attended in other municipalities such as Tervuren, Zaventem, Wezembeek-Oppem, Leuven, Haacht, and in the Brussels-Capital Region.

== Notable citizens ==
Citizens who were born or died in Kortenberg, lived a considerable time in Kortenberg, or still live there.

- Marie Abts-Ermens, sewed the first Belgian flag
- Félicien Marceau (born Louis Carette), French novelist
- family de Mérode, prominent Belgian noble family
- Comte Guillaume de Mérode, 5me Prince de Rubempré et d'Everberghe (1762-1830)
- Charles-Antoine-Ghislain (Karel) Count de Mérode-Westerloo, Minister of State
- Baron Albert Jozef de Vleeschauwer van Braekel, politician
- Robert J. Houben, Minister of State
- Jean Meeus, astronomer
- General Bernard Montgomery (in 1941 en 1944), British Army officer
- Edward Schillebeeckx, theologian
- Karel Van Miert, Minister of State and European Commissioner

== Gallery ==
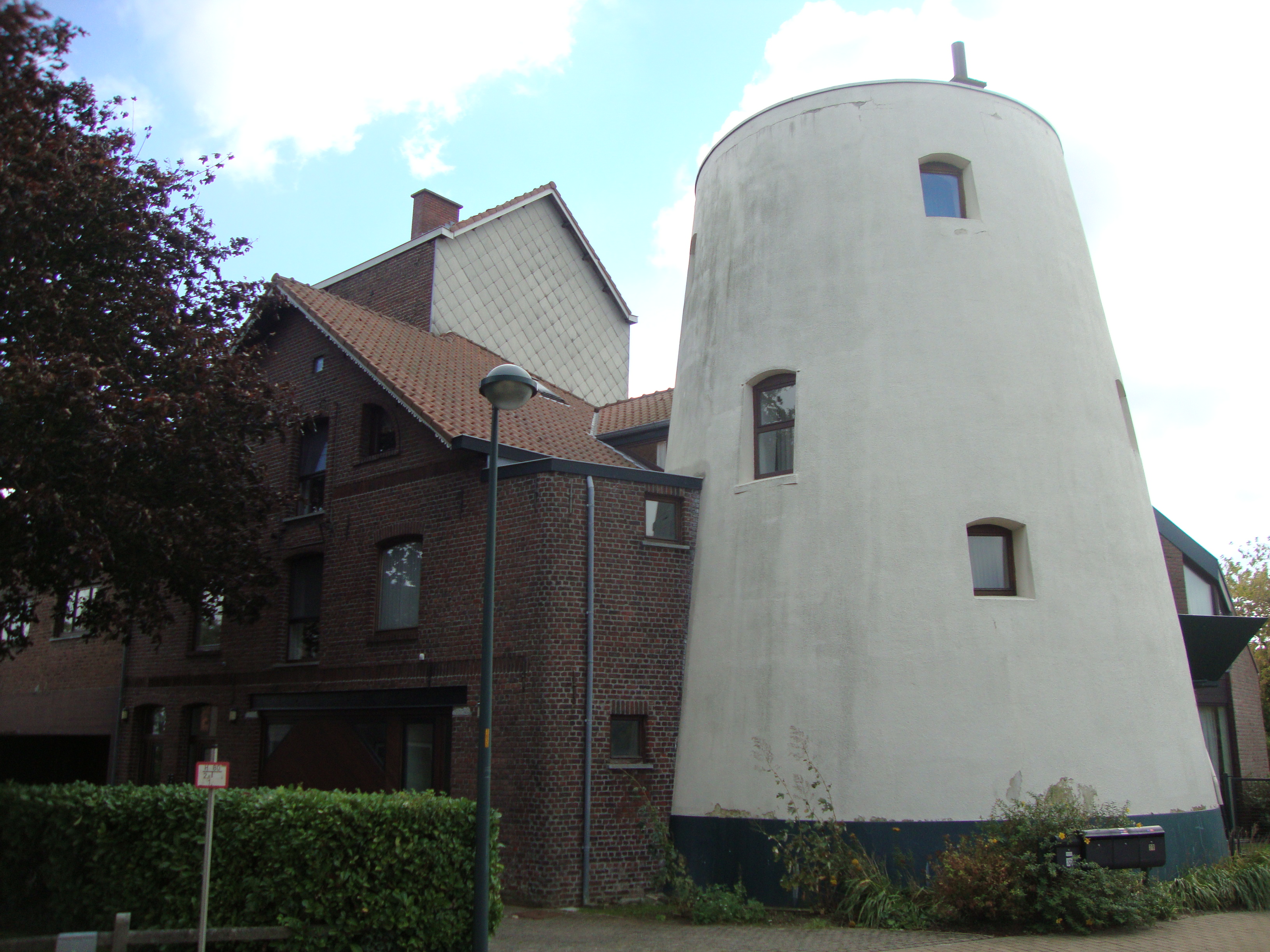
Windmill from the 19th century (Everberg)

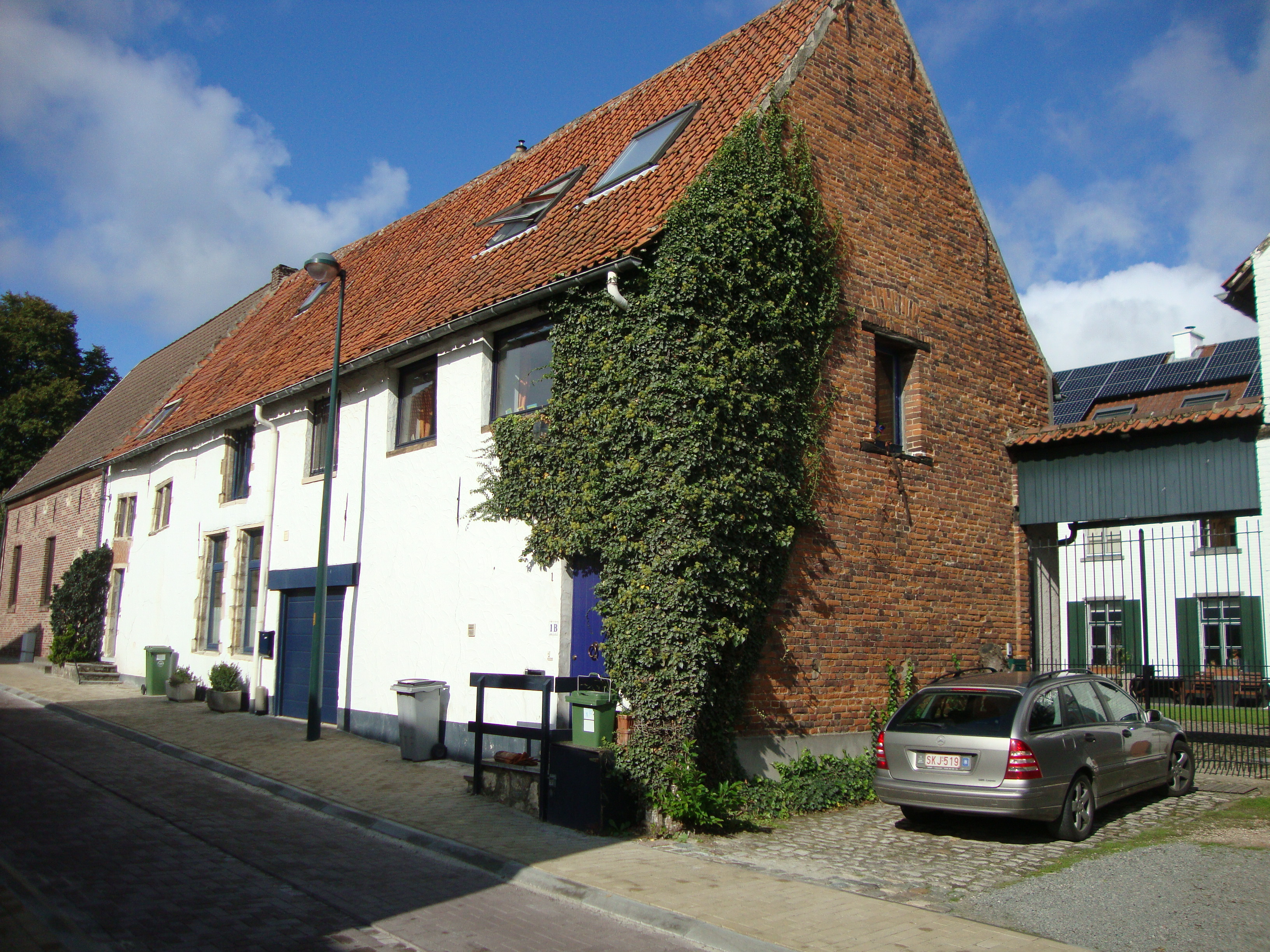
Farmhouse dated from 1628 (Everberg)

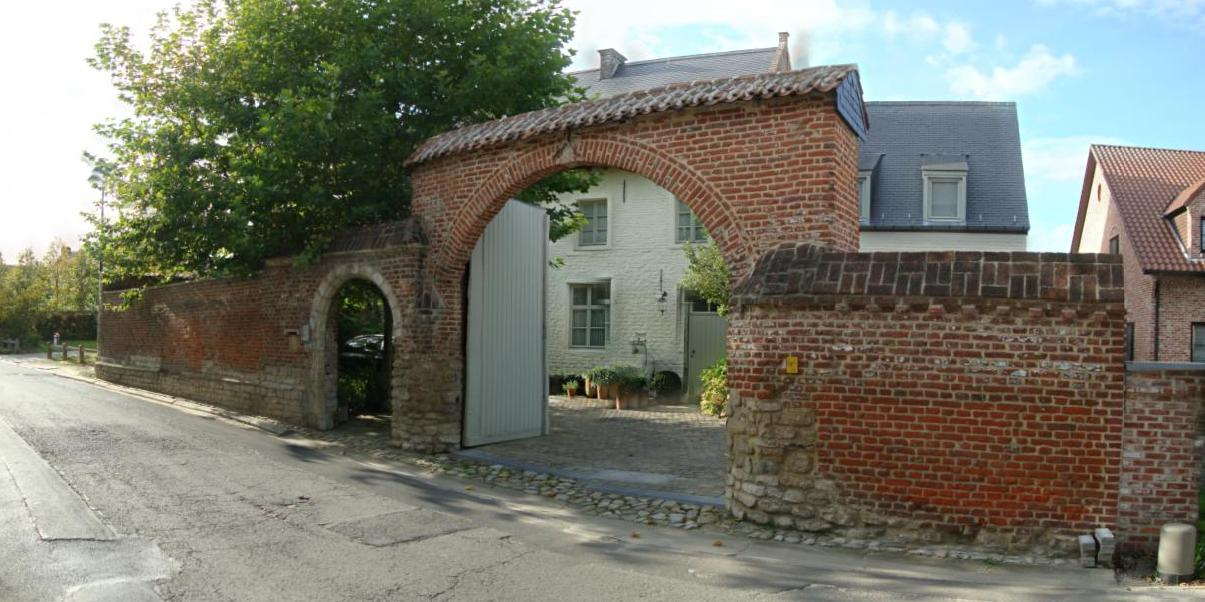
Long House with gable roof and two floors of the 18th century (Everberg)

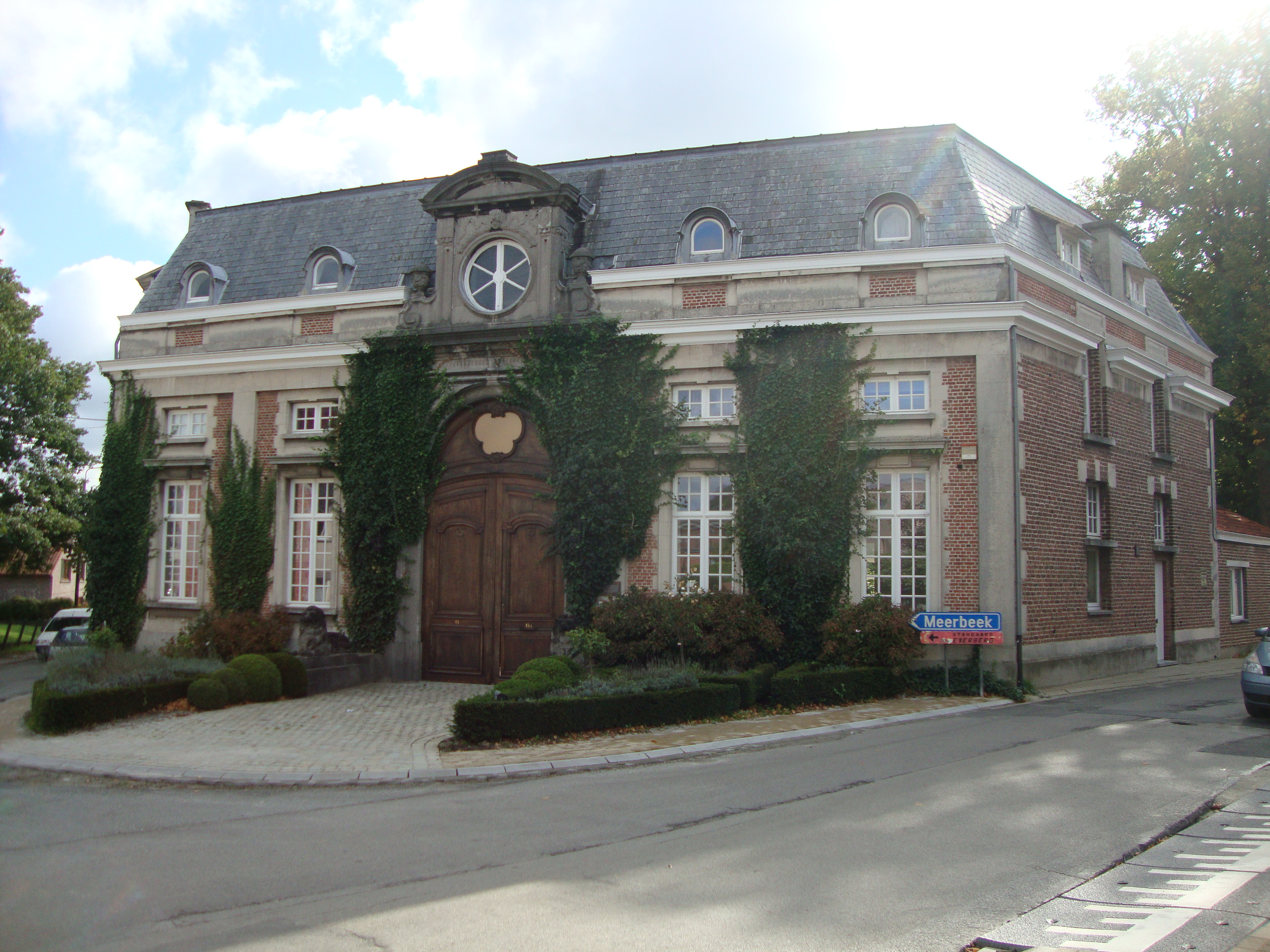
Gatehouse flanked by outbuildings and farmhouse from the 19th century (Everberg)

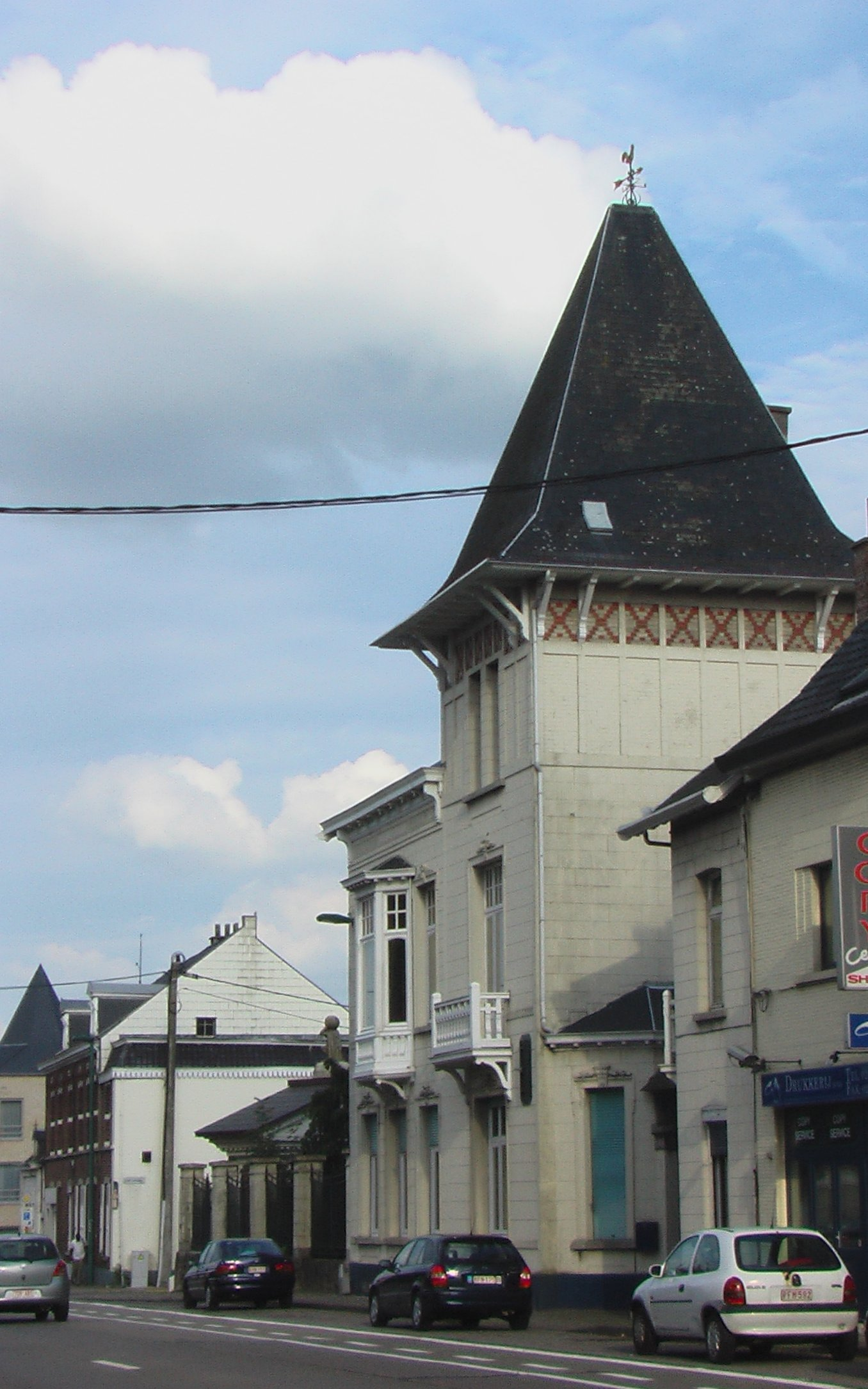
In Voscapel, built in 1719 with typical roof and tower construction (Kortenberg)

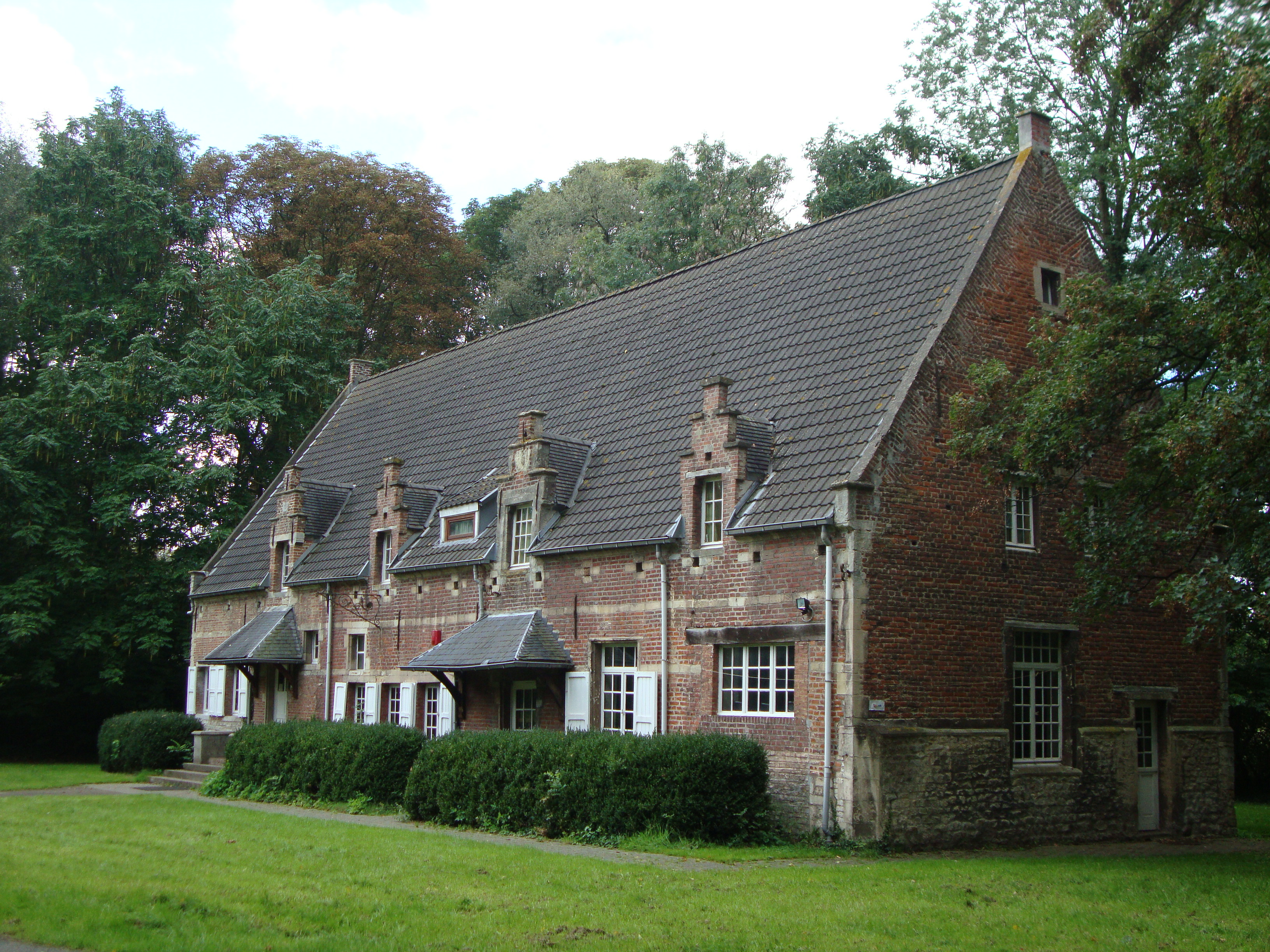
Benedictine Abbey annexe (Kortenberg)

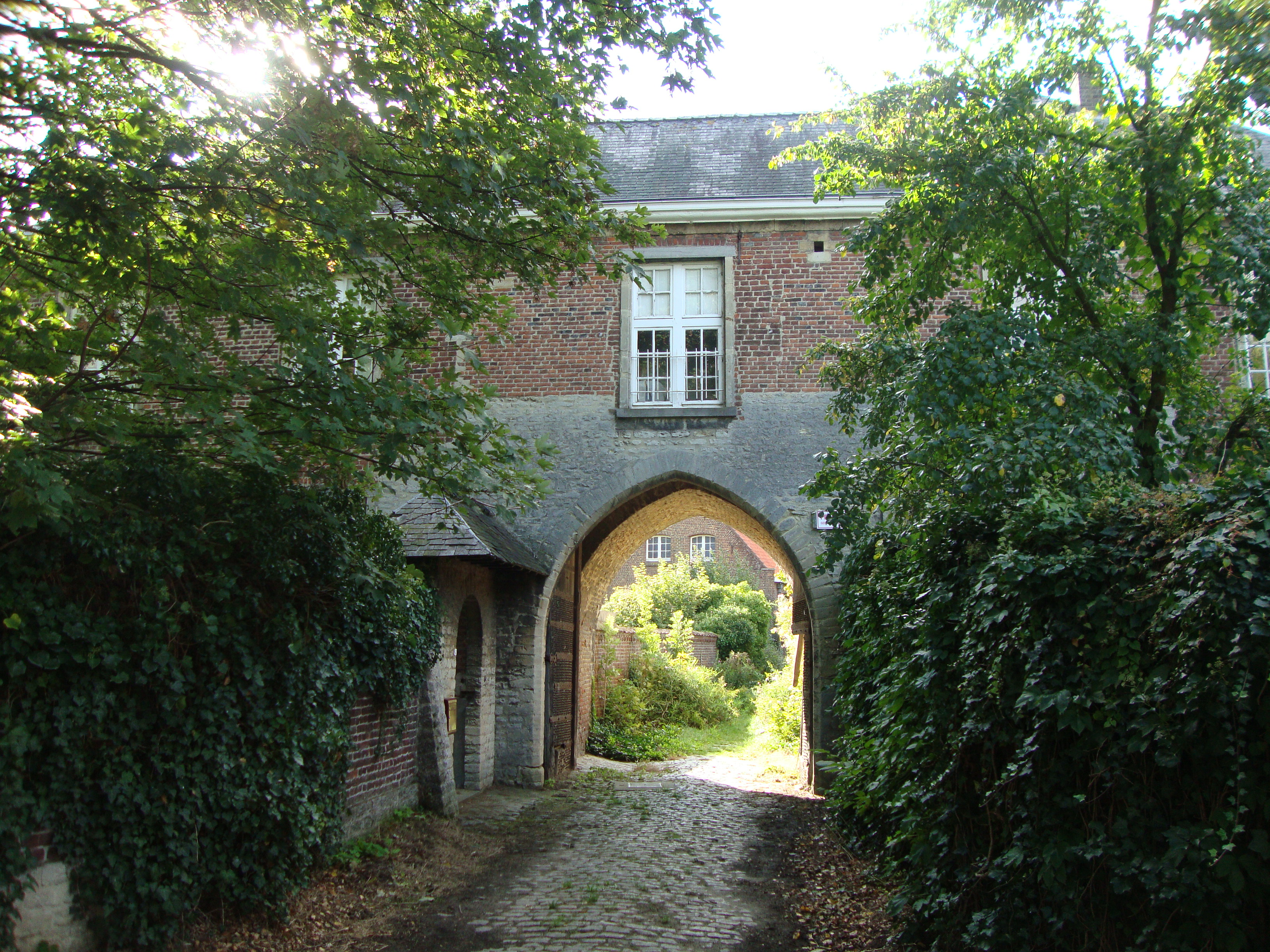
Gothic pointed arch door with bevel profile in the sandstone ground floor (Kortenberg)

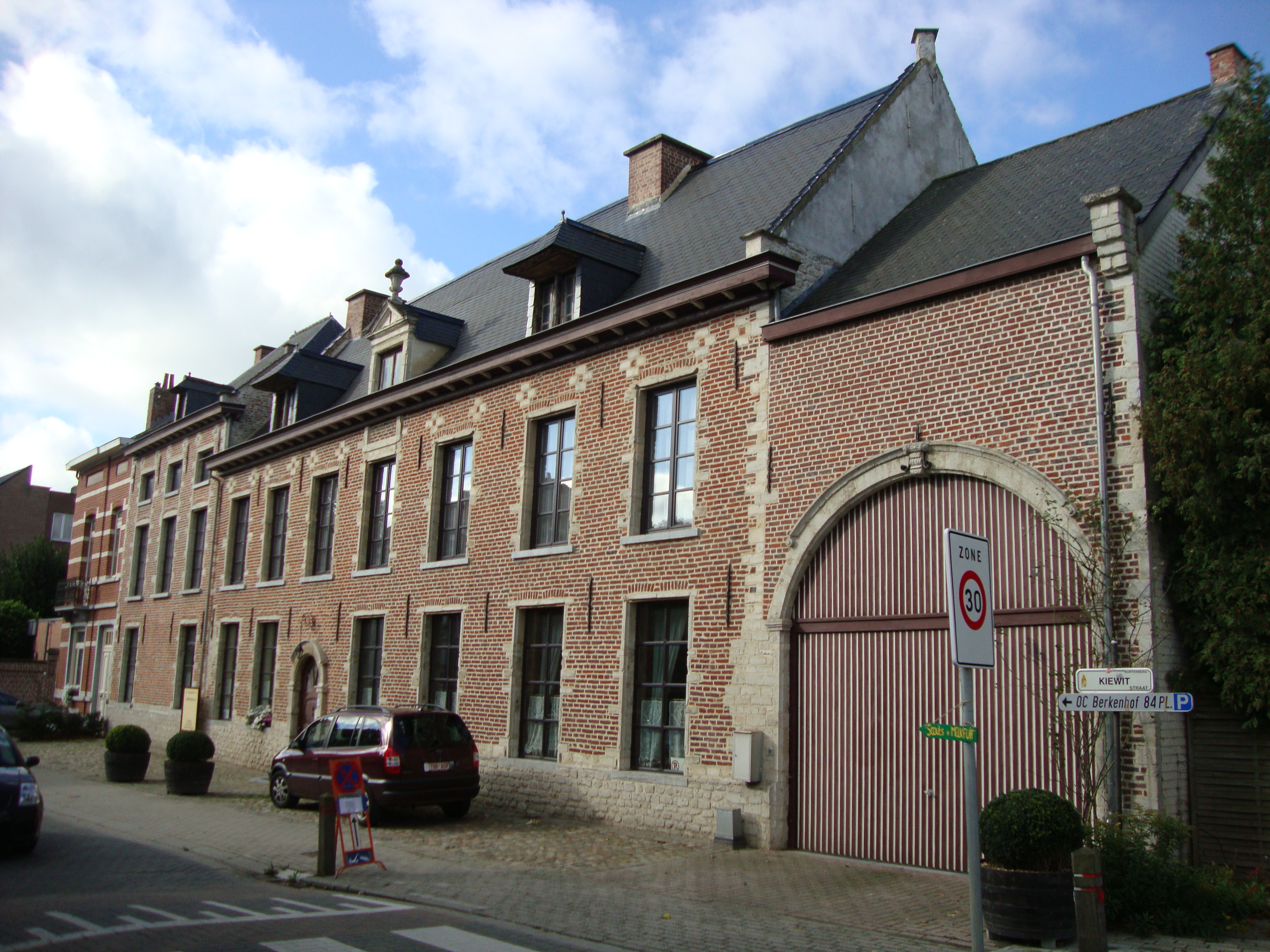
17th-18th century farm (Kortenberg)
