= Kempische Vaart =

Canal in Belgium

- Interactive map of Kempische Vaart

Specifications
- Length: 88 (1875)

History
- Date completed: 1846
- Date extended: 1859
- Date closed: 1940

Geography
- Start point: Zuid-Willemsvaart
- End point: Port of Antwerp
- Beginning coordinates: 51.186884°N 5.567194°E
- Ending coordinates: 51.235149°N 4.405639°E

The Kempische Vaart, later also known as Maas–Schelde Kanaal was a canal in Belgium that connected the Port of Antwerp to the Meuse via the Zuid-Willemsvaart. The Kempische Vaart, in French Canal de la Campine or Canal de jonction de la Meuse à l' Escaut can easily be confused with the Bocholt–Herentals Canal. This is because the first two parts of the Kempische Vaart stretched from Bocholt to Herentals. These were even known as Canal de Bocholt à Herenthals shortly after the second part was opened in 1846.

The first part of the Kempische Vaart, which led to Blauwe Kei, was completed in 1844. It primarily served to irrigate the Campine. In 1846, the second part was opened. It led to Herentals and primarily served to allow shipping to go from the Meuse to the Scheldt basin. In 1858, the connection from Herentals to Antwerp was changed to become a modern canal, connected to the first two parts.

In the 1930s, about a third of the Kempische Vaart was reused as part of the Albert Canal. Most of the rest was slightly upgraded. It effectively became the Bocholt–Herentals Canal when the Albert Canal finally opened in 1940. Unlike the Kempische Vaart, the current Bocholt–Herentals Canal is a canal of local interest.

== Context ==
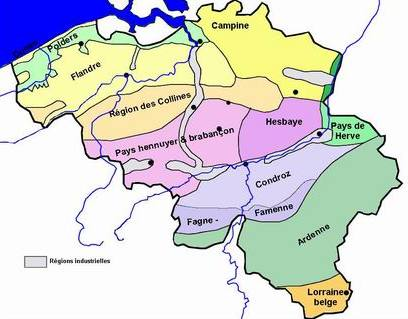
The Campine top right

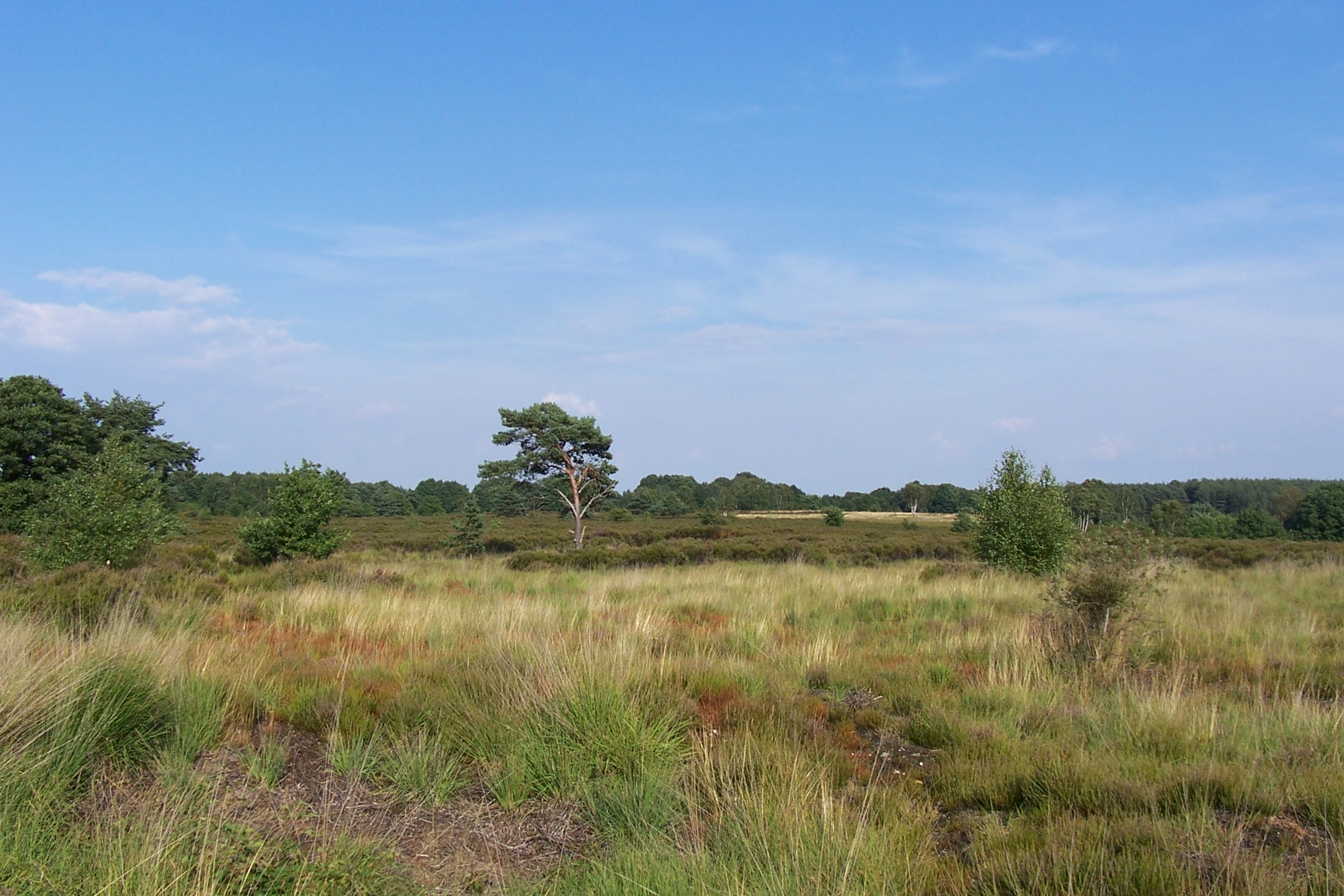
Maasmechelen heath

The Campine (Kempen) is an area with sandy soil. This caused that up to about 1860, it was sparsely populated and covered by heath, moors, oak forest and peatlands. Agriculture did not develop because the ground was not fertile.

Development of the Kempen required better transport facilities. For agriculture, vast amounts of fertilizer would have to be brought in at low cost. The products that the Kempen produced; like wood, timber, bark and charcoal were also bulky and low value. Therefore, it was logical to create a network of canals in the area.

The idea to canalize the Campine would get mixed up with ideas to connect Antwerp to the Meuse and Rhine. Such ideas date back to at least the Fossa Eugeniana project. This was started in 1626, but was never completed. In 1806 Napoleon ordered the construction of the Grand Canal du Nord. This canal was to connect Antwerp to Venlo (on the Meuse) and Neuss (on the Rhine). Actual construction started in 1809, but was aborted at the end of 1810.

After Belgium became independent in 1830–1831, it inherited a part of the Zuid-Willemsvaart. This 123 km long canal connected Maastricht to 's-Hertogenbosch and thus Liège to the North Sea ports. The new state got the 45 km long part of this canal that ran to the north from the gates of Maastricht to the village of Lozen, just north of Bocholt. Near Lozen, this canal takes a sharp turn to the northeast towards Weert.

The Belgian part of the Zuid-Willemsvaart had been built to the same specifications as the Dutch part. It was said to be usable for vessels of about 150t. However, others claimed that the Zuid-Willemsvaart allowed vessels of 400-500t. The canal was between 16.30 m and 18.40 m wide at the surface. The bed was 10 m wide and was 2.10 m deep. It had three locks, with the numbers 17, 18 and 19. These had a passage width of 7 m. The lock chamber of Lock 17 was 50 m long. By 1851, Lock 18 and 19 had a brick lock chamber that was only 45.40 m long.

The 1839 Treaty of London brought about the normalization of relations between the Netherlands and Belgium. The citizens of both countries would be able to use shared canals on the same conditions. Belgium could now try to make use of its part of the Zuid-Willemsvaart.

== History ==
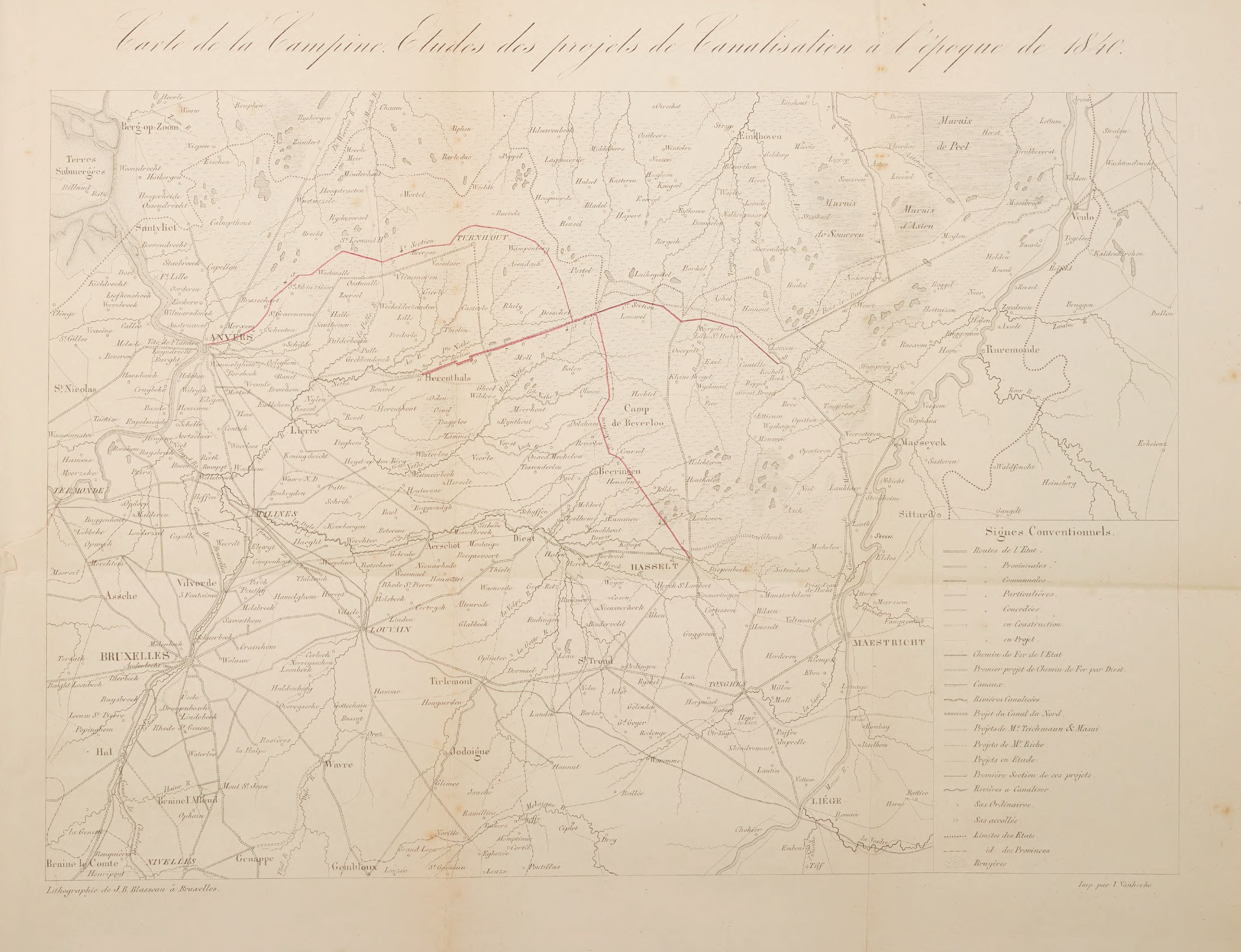
1840 Campine Canal plan

In 1838, the minister of public works ordered engineer U. Kümmer to coordinate several projects for the canalization, irrigation and land development in the Campine. While doing so, Kümmer had to take the connection of the Meuse to the Scheldt into account. He then had to present a final plan.

One of the projects that Kümmer studied was a plan presented by Engineer Masui in November 1835. It was the only plan that served both agricultural and navigational interests. It foresaw a main canal from Bocholt to Blauwe Kei (near Lommel on the border between Antwerp Province and Limburg Province). From there, a branch would go north to Turnhout and then west towards the Scheldt. Another branch would go from Blaue Kei to Hasselt. These three canals would be only 1.25 m deep. The locks would be 20 m long with a passage width of 2.20 m. Vessels of up to 25t would be able to use these canals. The total cost of this plan was estimated at 5,632,000 Francs. As an aside: the dimensions of a British narrowboat are about 6 feet 10 inches (2.08 m) by 57 feet (17.37 m).

The final plan made by engineer Kümmer was based on the Masui plan. It called for the construction of the Canal de la Campine in four parts:

1. From the Zuid-Willemsvaart to Blauwe Kei
2. From Blauwe Kei to Herentals
3. From Blauwe Kei to the Demer near Hasselt
4. From Blauwe Kei to Antwerp via Turnhout

The trajectory of Kümmer's plan differed from Masui's plan by calling for a new section from Blauwe Kei to Herentals. However, the main difference was in the dimensions of what Kümmer proposed. He proposed that the first part, i.e. that to Blauwe Kei would get the same dimensions as Zuid-Willemsvaart. For the other parts, Kümmer wanted to give only the part to Herentals the same dimensions. Of the total plan, Kümmer proposed to first dig only the canal to Blauwe Kei. This would cost about 2,000,000 Francs, but would incite businessmen to make good offers to participate in the project.

Kümmer noted that opening a canal would not automatically lead to the development of agriculture in the Campine. He also noted that most of the Campine consisted of communal lands, which were hard to develop. Kümmer proposed compulsory purchase of lands on the trajectory of the canal and the communal grounds that were located within 1 km of each bank. This land could then be rented out to companies or to individual farmers.

In September 1842, the Belgian Parliament approved a law that called for the construction of a canal from the Zuid-Willemsvaart to the Rupel.

=== The 'short' Kempische Vaart (1846) ===
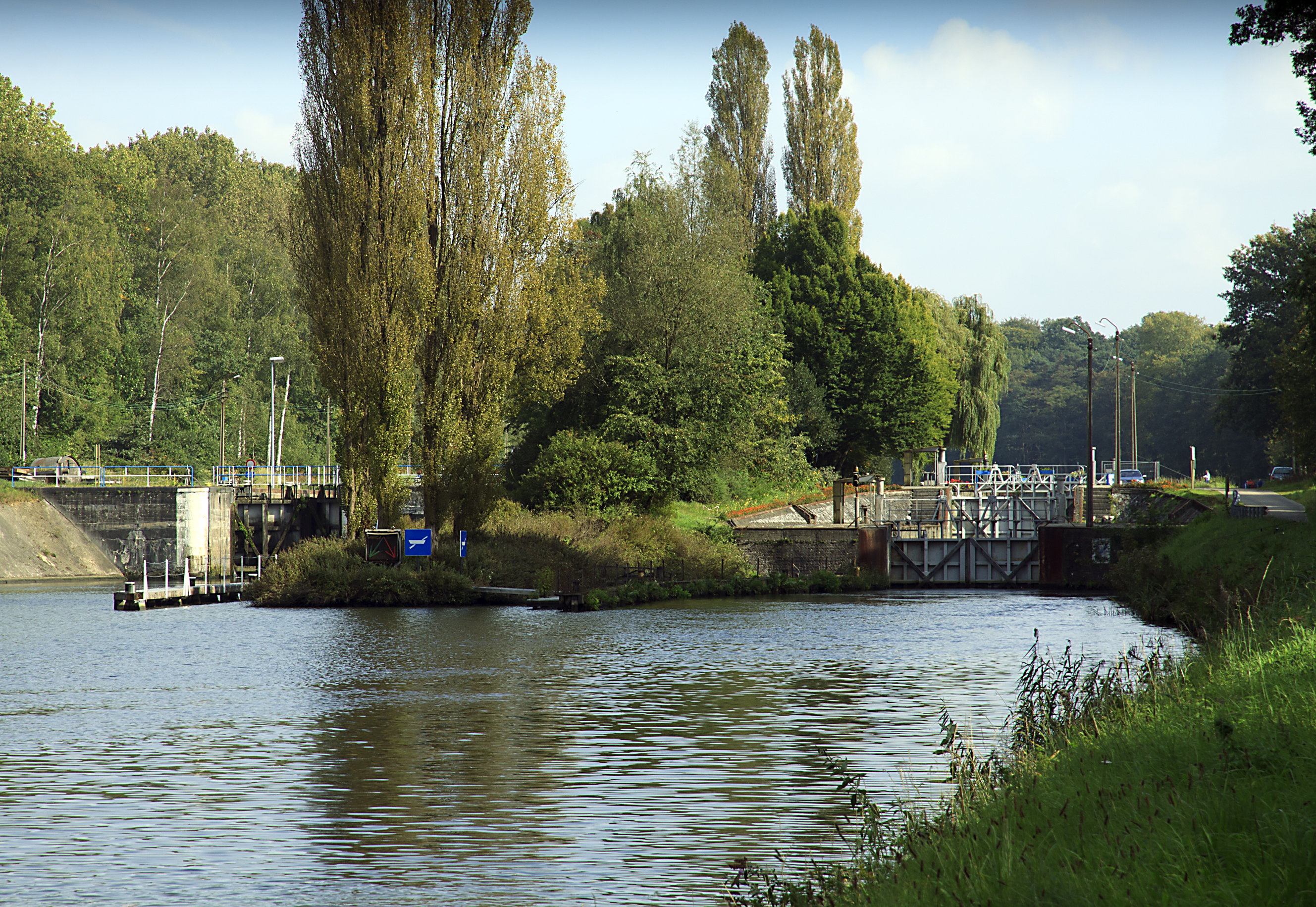
On the right Lock 2, now in the Bocholt–Herentals Canal

In February 1843, the Belgian parliament approved the construction of the first two parts of the canal. These were the part from Bocholt to Blauwe Kei and the part from Blauwe Kei to Herentals. From September 1842 to July 1846, four budget laws were approved to complete these two parts. These first two parts of the canal were 57.5 km long. They started 263 m upstream of Lock 18 in the Zuid-Willemsvaart and (originally) ended at Lock 6 of the canalized Kleine Nete just downstream of Herentals.

The first part was 27.2 km long and easy to construct. It ran from Bocholt to Blauwe Kei and had a single lock at Bocholt. This lock would normally be open, but in exceptional circumstances it could be closed and stop the water in both directions. It had a 5.50 m wide passage. The first part of the canal was opened for shipping on 22 August 1844.

The second part held all the locks. Just east of Herentals, it re-used two stretches of the Grand Canal du Nord. These were almost 12 km long, but no locks had been made. The new canal would get eleven locks. The first was 27 km downstream of the Zuid-Willemsvaart. The eleventh lock was just downstream of Herentals. The locks were 5.20 m wide between the gates and had an effective lock chamber length of 45 m. The first three locks were staircase locks that each had two consecutive chambers to handle a rise of 4.33 m. The water level at the upstream sill of locks 2-11 was only 1.65 m. The second part of the canal was opened for shipping on 21 September 1846.

The (cross) section of the first two parts of the canal differed. The first 16 km of the first part was 2.10 m deep with a bed width of 10 m. The rest of the first part initially had the same depth of 2.10 m, but with a bed width of only 6.00 m. However, on the sides, two lateral banks would allow for later widening the canal without extra costs. In the second part, the canal was initially only 1.65 m deep. Here too, digging away the banks would allow a bed width of 10 m and a depth of 2.10 m.

The third part of the original canal plan was still a dead letter in 1847. Nothing had been done for it, However, in February 1858, it was opened for navigation.

The fourth part of the original plan got more attention. Near Dessel, a branch formed the Dessel–Turnhout canal. This was from the start intended to be extended to Antwerp. With a depth of only 1.65 m, it was a substantially smaller canal. This fourth part of the original canal plan was opened for shipping on 21 September 1846. This canal became the Dessel–Turnhout–Schoten Canal when the part west of Turnhout was finally completed in 1875.

=== The extended Kempische Vaart (1859) ===
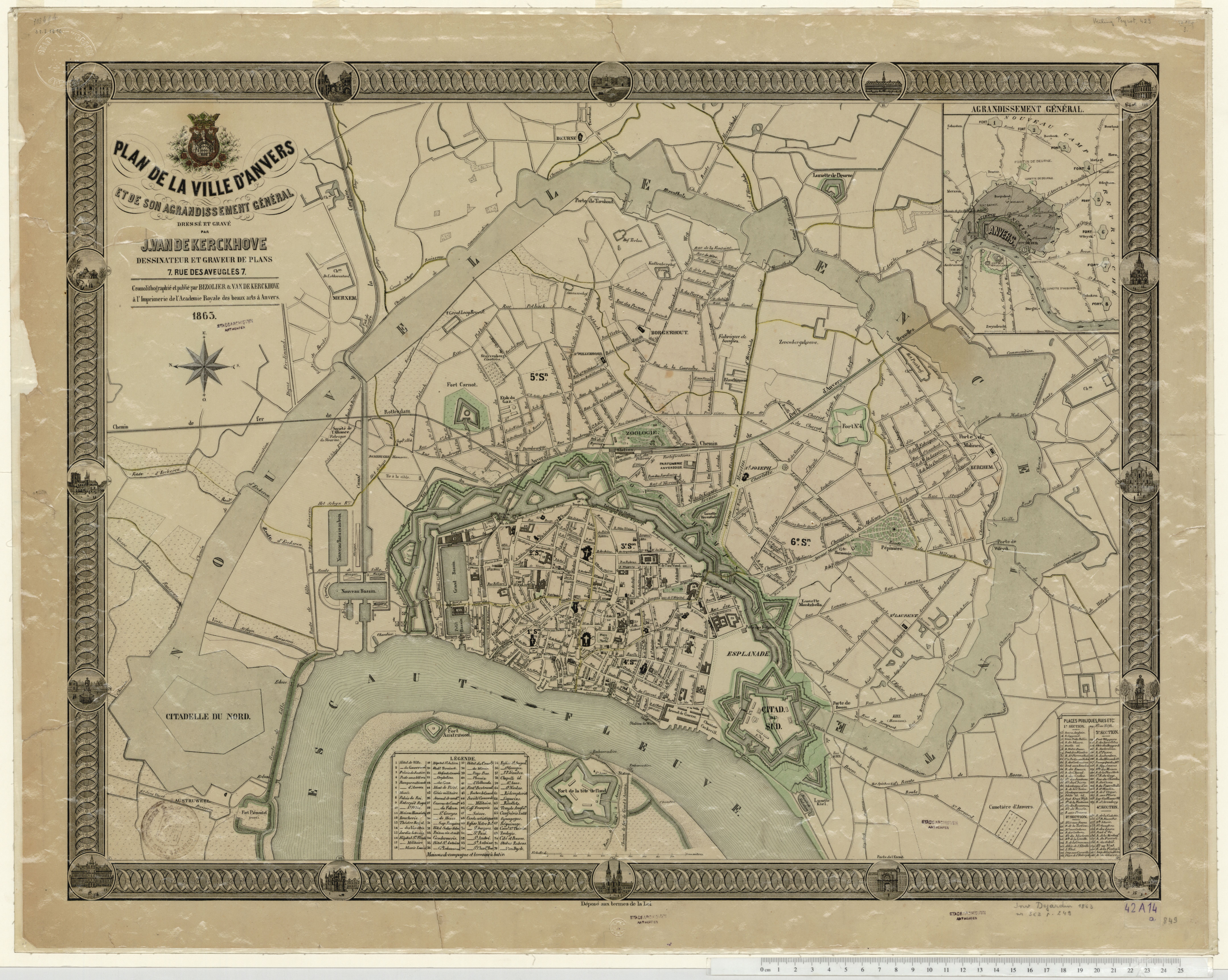
The Campine Canal and the wet docks in Antwerp, 1863

After the first parts of the Kempische Vaart were completed, it relied on the canalized Kleine Nete for the connection to Lier and from there, to Antwerp. This canal was 23 km long and had six locks with chambers of 20 m by 3 m. These were only usable for vessels with a draft of up to 1.10 m. It made that this canal could only be used by tiny vessels of 40-50t.

There were several options to extend the Campine Canal to Antwerp. They were discussed as 'third part of the Canal connecting the Meuse to the Scheldt'. In the end it was decided to dig a new canal from Herentals to Antwerp. The route went along Massenhoven, Oelegem, Wijnegem and Den Dam. Between Herentals and Grobbendonk the roads called Lenteheide, Troon and Del mark its disappeared trajectory. In Antwerp, its last lock connected the canal to the Kattendijk Dock. The canal primarily differed from the 1803 Canal du Nord plan, because East of Antwerp, the canal would share a part with another canal. This was the fourth part of the original canal plan, i.e. the branch to Turnhout that would also be extended to Antwerp.

Between Herentals and Antwerp, the canal got the same dimensions as the Zuid-Willemsvaart. The bed of the canal was 10 m wide with a depth of 2.10 m. Five locks were 7.5 m wide and 2.10 m deep with an effective lock chamber length of 45 m. The sixth lock connected to the Antwerp docks. On the sea side, it had a sill at a depth of 2.73 m. This was based on the lowest tide being 0.63 m below the general water level in Belgium. At the very end of the canal was the Kattendijk Sea Lock.

The first part of the extended Kempische Vaart was opened for navigation in October 1856, the final part in October 1859.

=== The uniform Kempische Vaart (1862) ===
After the part between Antwerp and Herentals had been opened in 1858, the canal could still be used only by relatively small vessels. This was due to the smaller (45.00 m by 5.20 m by 1.65 m) locks between Herentals and Blauwe Kei. Already in 1856, the sluice / lock at Bocholt had got an extra chamber with a passage width of 7.50 m.

In September 1859, the government took a loan of 2,300,000 Francs to make the second part of the canal consistent with the first and third part. It would finally get the planned depth of 2.10 m with bed width of 10 m. Its locks would be widened from 5.50 to 7.50 m and lengthened. These works were finished in 1862. The total cost of the canal was by then estimated at 11-12 million Franks.

Already in 1872, another change was made. Increased trade led to the construction of new docks east of Kattendjk Dock. It led to Lock 17 of the canal being removed and rebuilt more to the east on the IJzerlaan. It shortened the canal by 817.30 m.

In 1880, the Kempische Vaart was said to have these locks:

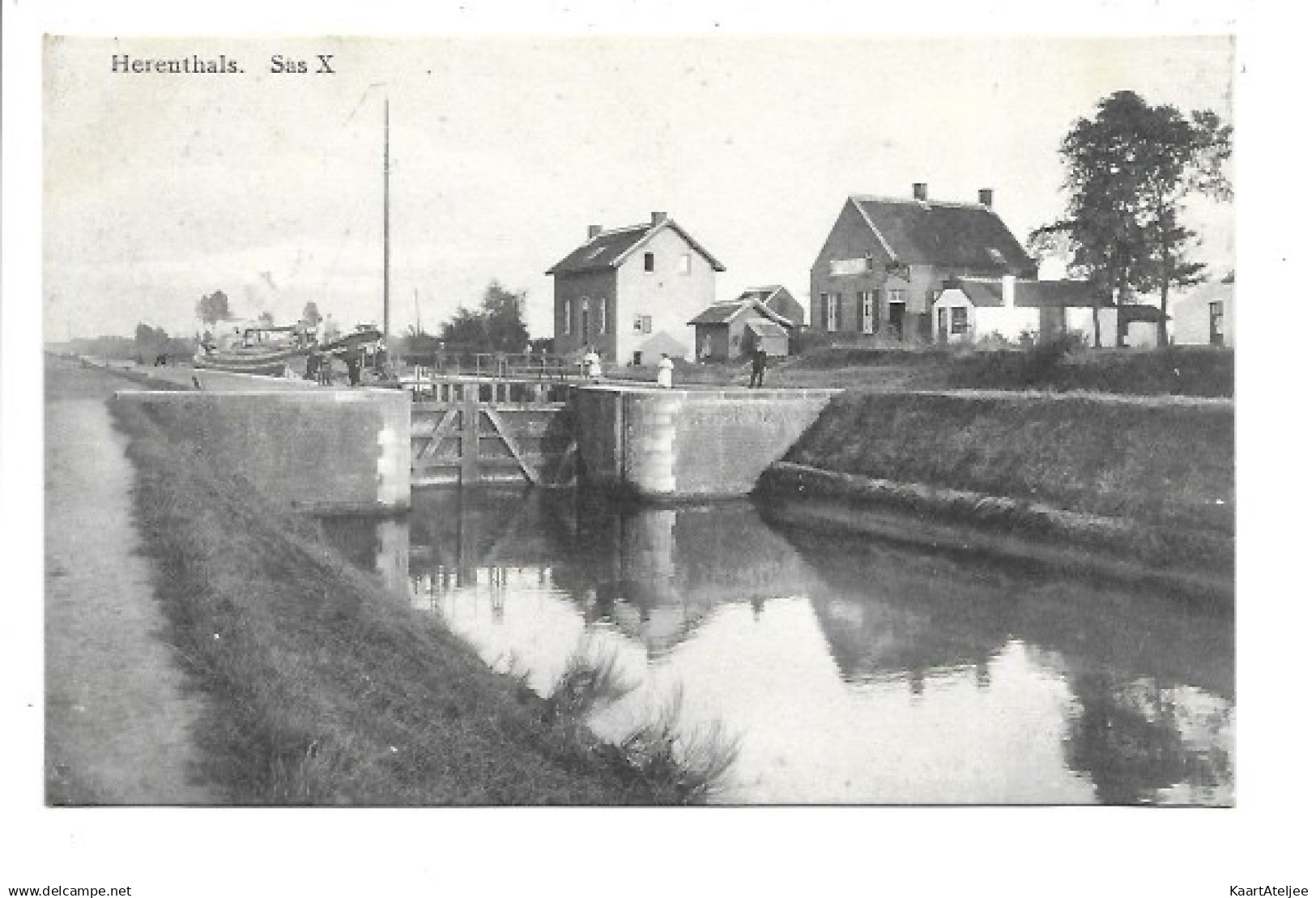
Lock 10 in Herentals, 1914

Locks on the Kempische Vaart in 1862. Some of these have disappeared.
Name	Location	Length × width (m)	Vertical lift (m)	Pass in
Double Ecluse de prise d'eau	Bocholt	27.00 x 7.50	N/a	N/a
Lock 1	Blauwe Kei, Lommel	50.00 x 7,00	4.28	33 minutes
Lock 2	Mol	50.00 x 7.00	4.33	30 minutes
Lock 3	Mol	50.00 x 7.00	4.33	30 minutes
Lock 4	Dessel	50.00 x 7.00	2.57	22 minutes
Lock 5	Dessel	50.00 x 7.00	2.11	25 minutes
Lock 6	Millegem	50.00 x 7.00	1.92	20 minutes
Lock 7	Geel	50.00 x 7.00	2.50	30 minutes
Lock 8	Geel	50.00 x 7.00	1.90	30 minutes
Lock 9	Geel	50.00 x 7.00	1.90	20 minutes
Lock 10 (disappeared)	Herentals*	50.00 x 7.00	2.61	30 minutes
Lock 11 (disappeared)	Herentals	50.00 x 7.00	1.90	20 minutes
Lock 12 (disappeared)		50.00 x 7.00	1.20	13 minutes
Lock 13 (disappeared)		50.00 x 7.00	N/a	13 minutes
Lock 14 (disappeared)		50.00 x 7.00	1.40	14 minutes
Lock 15 (disappeared)	W. of Wijnegem	50.00 x 7.00	2.00	20 minutes
Lock 16 (disappeared)	E. of Merxem	50.00 x 7.00	2.50	19 minutes
Lock 17(disappeared)	Antwerp**	50.00 x 7.00	-0.96	12 minutes
Kattendijk Lock	Scheldt	66.60? x 24.80	tidal	?
* The current Lock 10 on the Bocholt–Herentals Canal is in a different location.
** Parts of Lock 17 have been reused on the 'IJzer Canal'.

=== The 600t canal (1930–1941) ===
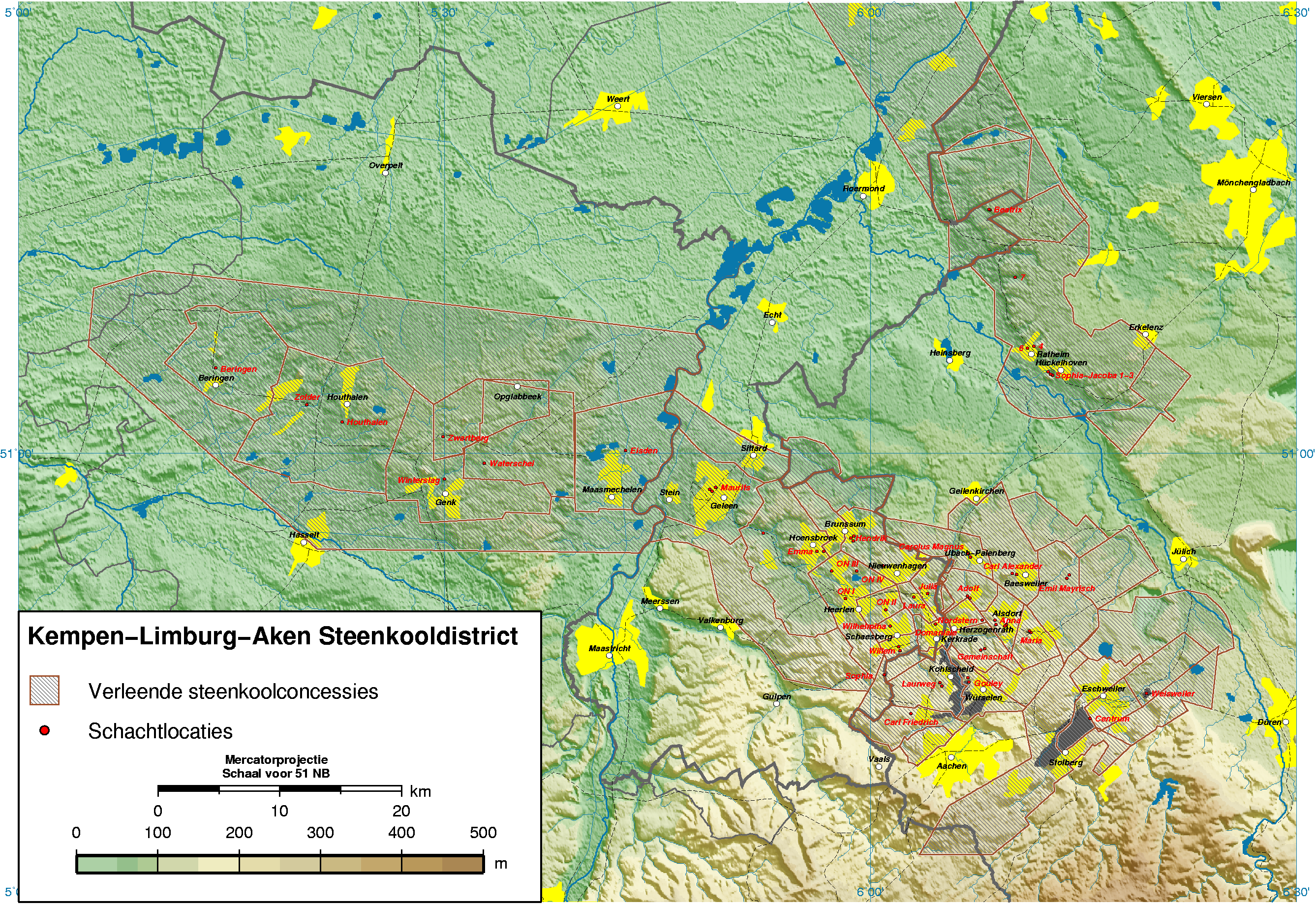
Coal mining concessions

In the early twentieth century, a great coal mining industry developed in the Kempen, Dutch South Limburg, and near Aachen. Combined with other industrial developments, this led to a huge increase in shipping on the Scheldt–Meuse canal and on the Zuid-Willemsvaart. The Dutch government then decided to build the Juliana Canal to access their Limburg coal mines. It would make Maastricht and Liège reachable for 1,350 / 2000t barges. The Juliana Canal would open in 1935.

The Belgian government feared that the Juliana Canal would make Rotterdam the primary port for Liège. It therefore wanted to create a new connection between Antwerp and Liège. This had to be fit for the same barges as those on the Juliana Canal and had to be completely on Belgian territory. These ideas were voiced in a 1927 report by a national commission for great works.

The commission proposed the canal that would later become the Albert Canal. It would re-use a part of the Meuse–Scheldt Canal that was between Antwerp and Herentals. East of Herentals, the Meuse–Scheldt Canal could not be upgraded for these barges, because it was too long and had too many locks and bridges.

The construction of the part of the Albert Canal between Lixhe (near Visé) and Herentals was complex and could lead to surprises. The commission therefore advised to immediately upgrade the Meuse–Scheldt Canal and the rest of the route to Liège for ships of 600t. This had to be ready in five years. Even before its advice, this had been done for the part between Bocholt and Blauwe Kei and that from Maastricht to the former. Most of it had got a bed width of 15-16 m and a depth of 2.50 to 3 m. This allowed the Kempenaar barges to load 600t of cargo.

In the early 1930s, work to make the canal suitable for 600t vessels was pressed forward. The Belgian government wanted this to be finished before the opening of the Juliana Canal, which was expected in July 1934. A work that aimed to solve congestion was the construction of three single chamber locks next to staircase Locks 1-3. Lock 1N was completed in May 1931. Lock 2N was finished at about the same time, and Lock 3N was finished in July 1932.

Many other measures were taken to speed up traffic between Antwerp and Liège. This trip took 16 days in 1926, but took only about 5 days in 1938. Motor vessels were even faster. It made that traffic on the canal doubled between 1926 and 1937. Freight meanwhile dropped from about 26 Franc in 1929 to about 11 Franc in 1935.

=== Bocholt–Herentals Canal (1940-present) ===
The Albert Canal received its name in 1930. It was officially opened on 30 July 1939. As is usual for canals, the effective opening took place somewhat earlier. However, in mid-1939, a dike broke between Hasselt and Genk, causing a lot of damage. To all appearances, this delayed the effective opening of the Albert Canal for shipping to Christmas 1940.

The effective opening of the Albert Canal over its entire length changed the nature of the Kempische Vaart / Meuse–Scheldt Canal. It obviously made the latter name inappropriate. This explains the new name Bocholt–Herentals Canal.

== Shipping on the canal ==
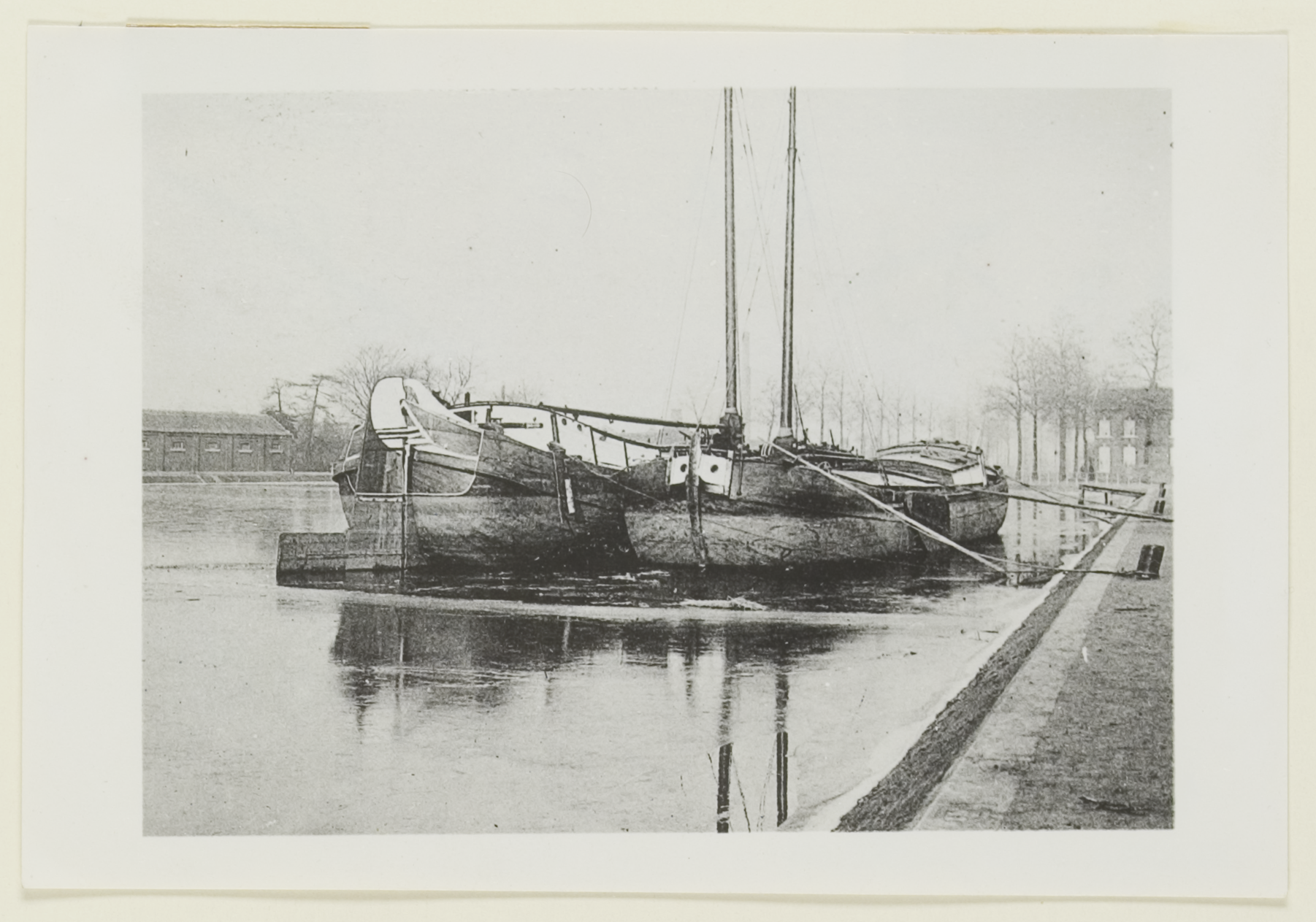
Otters (a barge type) on the canal probably near Antwerp

Some shipping numbers were published for 1851–1860. These showed a very strong increase in shipping on the second and third part of the canal. On the first part, there was also a strong increase, but this did not keep up with the parts between Antwerp and Blauwe Kei. There was a toll system on the canal. Vessels carrying fertilizer were exempt.

An 1880 account gives a description of traffic on the canal. There were tow paths along both sides of the canal. These were at least 1.50 m wide and were covered with gravel. Most barges were towed by horses or humans, but the latter applied only to boats of 50–70t. Steam towage was rare, only about five vessels per month. If it was done, it was normally done by steam freighters. Multiple attempts to use steam tugboats had failed. A horse and driver could be hired for 10 Francs a day. A man for about 2.5 Francs a day.

Ships of up to 450t capacity were said to be able to use the canal. (This is inline with the above claim about vessels on the Zuid-Willemsvaart.) In 1880, the biggest ships on the canal were said to reach 300–330t.

As regards tonnage, there were three normal categories of barges on the canal.

- 60–80t
- 130–140t
- 200t

As regards type, there were multiple types, all with a movable mast:

- Small long and narrow boats that sailed the Ourthe
- Narrow boats from the Brussel–Charleroi canal
- Brabant barges
- Dutch barges from the Scheldt
- Flat bottomed pointed barges from the Meuse
- The big barges from Mons and Tournai

Cargo consisted of:

- Pine wood for the coal mines and firewood
- Coal from Liège to Antwerp and Limburg
- Building materials
- Iron products like rails and bars from Liège to Antwerp
- Hay from the Campine
- Overseas timber from Antwerp to Liège
- Overseas cereals from Antwerp to Liège
- Sand for glass works dug out along the canal

== Land development in the Campine ==
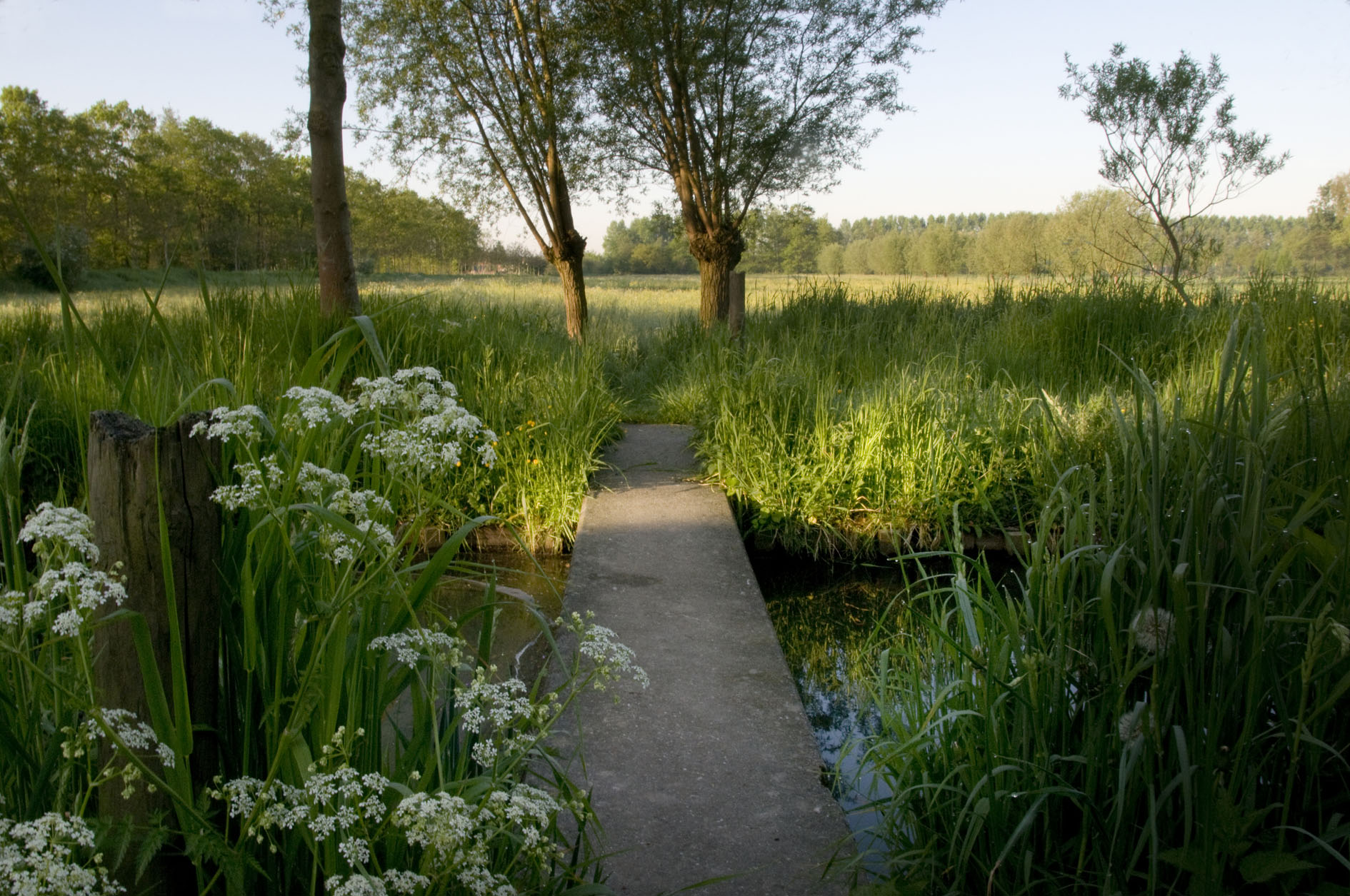
Nature reserve De Watering was irrigated by the canal

The other or main goal of the canal was Land development in the Campine. In about 1890, the flood-meadows measured 2,115 hectares, of which 1,515 directly on the canal. The initial idea was that seasonal surface flooding would be enough to turn the sandy grounds along the canal into fertile land. However, the new owners soon discovered that manure was required to make the land fertile.

The irrigation of the Campine led to a political conflict, because it required enormous amounts of water. The new owners of the land numbered a few dozen, presided by Barthélémy de Theux de Meylandt. These were so powerful that they drove the Belgian government to take as much water as possible to serve their interests. They even wanted to dam the Meuse, but the Dutch government prevented this.

Meanwhile, the Belgian policy destroyed a lot of shipping on the Dutch Meuse. In dry years, navigation became impossible for up to five months and freight increased by up to 500%. However, from the mid-1850s the Belgian government began to place the interests of industry and trade above those of the new landowners. In 1863, this led to a Meuse treaty with the Netherlands. It determined that the amount of water that Campine canals got depended on the water level in the Meuse.

== Disappearance ==
- The part from the Asia Dock to the Breda Gate (part of the Fortifications of Antwerpen) was replaced by a part of the Albert Canal which ran from that gate to the Lefèbvre Dock.
- The part from the Breda Gate to Wijnegem was upgraded and became part of the Albert Canal
- The part from Wijnegem to Vierselheide also became part of the Albert Canal.
- The part from Vierselheide to east of Herentals was filled up. Instead the Albert Canal passed south of the town.
- The part from Herentals to Bocholt was about two-thirds of the canal. It got a new connection to the Albert Canal east of Herentals and was renamed Bocholt–Herentals Canal. This led to the construction of the current Lock 10.

== Resurfaces in Antwerp (2015) ==
In the 2010s, the IJzerlaan Bridge over the Albert Canal had to be replaced to allow barges to carry more layers of containers. As it was not possible to make a higher bridge for cars, this became a bicycle and pedestrian bridge. Along the IJzerlaan, the Kempische Vaart had been filled up in the 1930s, but its walls were still there. A new IJzerlaan Canal was then made using parts of the old canal walls and parts of the second Lock 17.
