= Herentals =

- City and municipality
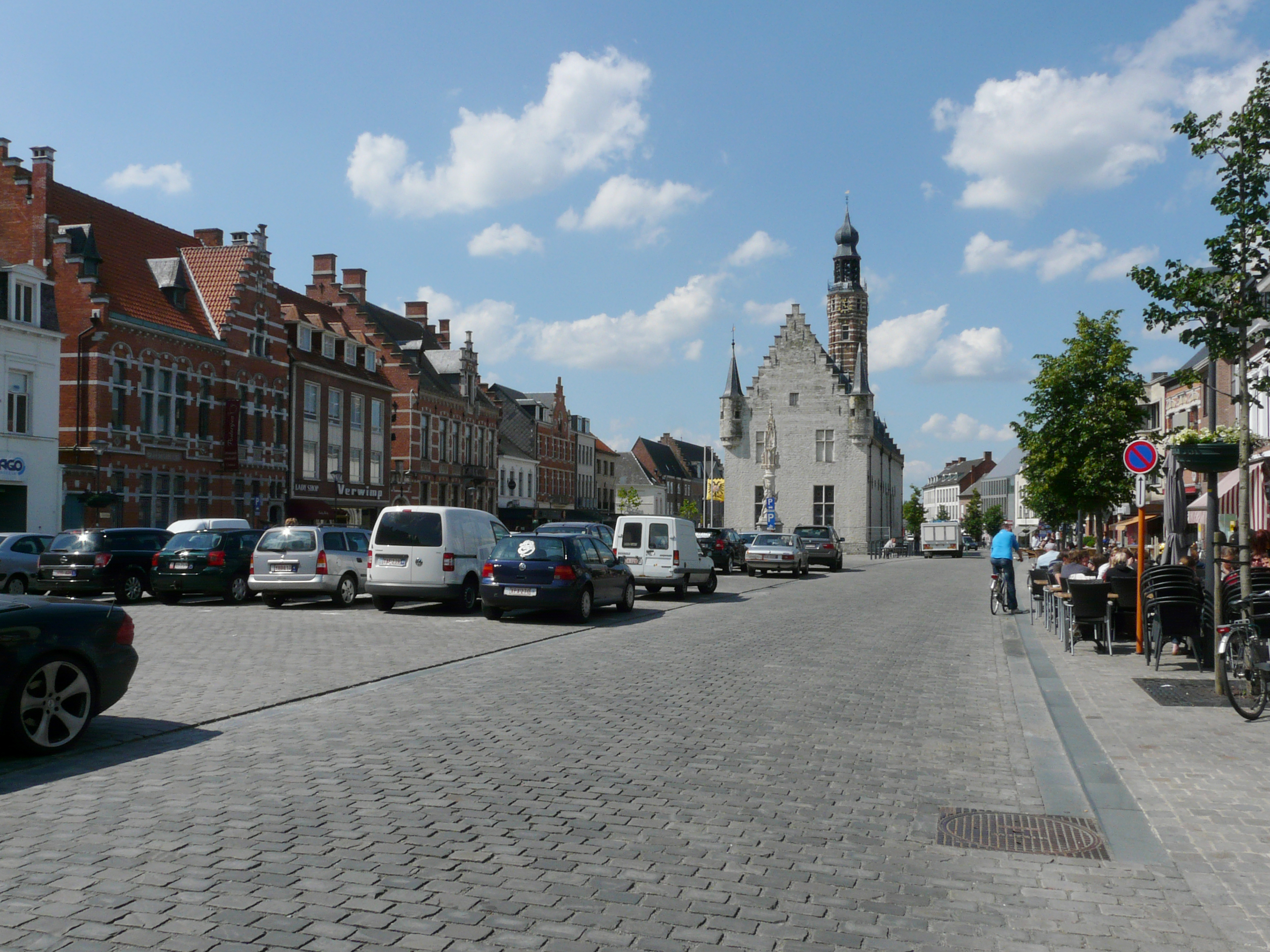

- Flag Coat of arms

- Location of Herentals in the province of Antwerp
- Interactive map of Herentals
- Location in Belgium
- Coordinates: 51°11′N 04°50′E
- Country: Belgium
- Community: Flemish Community
- Region: Flemish Region
- Province: Antwerp
- Arrondissement: Turnhout

Government
  - Mayor: Jan Michielsen (CD&V) (acting)
  - Governing parties: N-VA, CD&V

Area
  - Total: 47.95 km^{2} (18.51 sq mi)

Population (2020-01-01)
  - Total: 28,272
  - Density: 589.6/km^{2} (1,527/sq mi)
- Postal codes: 2200
- NIS code: 13011
- Area codes: 014
- Website: www.herentals.be

Herentals (Dutch pronunciation: [ˈɦeːrə(n)tɑls]) is a municipality and city in the province of Antwerp. The municipality comprises the city of Herentals proper and the towns of Morkhoven and Noorderwijk. In 2022, Herentals had a total population of 28,455. The total area is 48.56 km^{2} (18.75 sq mi). Saint Waltrude is the patron saint of the city.

== Highlights ==
Herentals has some outstanding historical buildings, including the church and town hall; the town hall and its belfry is listed as one of the Belfries of Belgium and France, a UNESCO World Heritage Site. The old city gates, the Bovenpoort (Northern gate) and Zandpoort (Western gate) are still standing, while the Nederpoort and Koepoort were torn down a long time ago.

The Hidrodoe science museum is located in Herentals. There is also a large chocolate factory located in Herentals, which is the only production facility in the world for Milka's Leo chocolate wafer bar.

Herentals is a centre of commerce in the region, although the cities of Geel and Mol are quite popular as well.

Herentals is twinned with IJsselstein, Netherlands. The inhabitants of the Campine region have common sobriquets that are particular to their towns; people from Herentals are referred to by the colloquialisms "Klokkenververs" (meaning "bell painters") and "Peestekers", which comes from the old story about the farmers of the town using carrots (pekes, "pee"-stekers) as a lock on the "Zandpoort", one of the great city gates in that time.

== History ==
=== 19th century ===
In 1803 surveyors started work to construct the Grand Canal du Nord that aimed to connect the Scheldt to the Meuse and the Rhine. In 1806 Herentals was included in the trajectory. Antwerpen would temporarily connect to Herentals via the Scheldt, Rupel, Nete and Kleine Nete, but the part from the Rupel to Herentals was useless. After a few years, the works were stopped, because the canal was no longer needed after Napoleon got the Dutch harbors under his control.

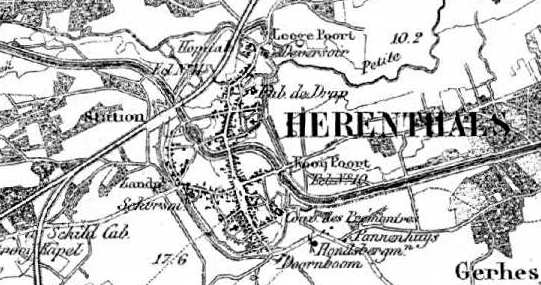
The Kempische Vaart through Herentals

After Belgium became independent, the idea to make a waterway from Antwerp to the Meuse was revived. The Nete Canal between the Rupel and Duffel was opened in 1839. That same year, the canalized Kleine Nete towards Herentals was opened. In 1846, the first part of the new Campine Canal was extended from Blauwe Kei to a point west of Herentals. This resulted in the first effective connection between the Meuse and the Scheldt, known as Kempische Vaart or Maas–Schelde Kanaal. The Kempische Vaart went straight through the center of Herentals along the Augustijnenlaan and Belgiëlaan. In the 1930s, the new Albert Canal became the main connection to the Meuse. It passes south of Herentals, where Lock 10 gives access to the remains of the Kempische Vaart. These now form the Bocholt–Herentals Canal.

Herentals also became an important rail transport center. In 1855, the Herentals–Turnhout part of Belgian railway line 29, which ran from Aarschot to Tilburg was opened. The connection from Lier to Herentals, part of Belgian railway line 15 was opened that same year. In 1878, the Iron Rhine section from Herentals to Moll was opened. Herentals railway station had several branches to local industries and military facilities. It was also a tramway hub. The stations Herentals-Kanaal and Noorderwijk-Morkhoven have been closed.

== Transport ==
Herentals has only one railway station: Herentals railway station. The town is on the motorway A13 (E313). The ring motorway R15 has not been completed yet. Just south of Herentals, the Bocholt–Herentals Canal connects to the Albert Canal via Lock 10.

== Notable people ==
- Nicolaes Francken, painter, founder of the Francken painting dynasty (1520–1596)
- Hendrik de Moy, father of Isabella Brant (1534–1610)
- Hieronymus Francken I, painter (c. 1540–1610)
- Frans Francken the Elder, painter (1542–1616)
- Ambrosius Francken I, painter (1544–1618)
- Charles-Auguste Fraikin, sculptor (1817–1893)
- Stefaan Vaes, mathematician (born 1976)
- Rik Van Looy, professional cyclist (1933–2024)
- Wout van Aert, professional cyclist (born 1994)
- Wim Eyckmans, racing driver (born 1973)
- Ean Eyckmans, racing driver (born 2008)

== Gallery ==
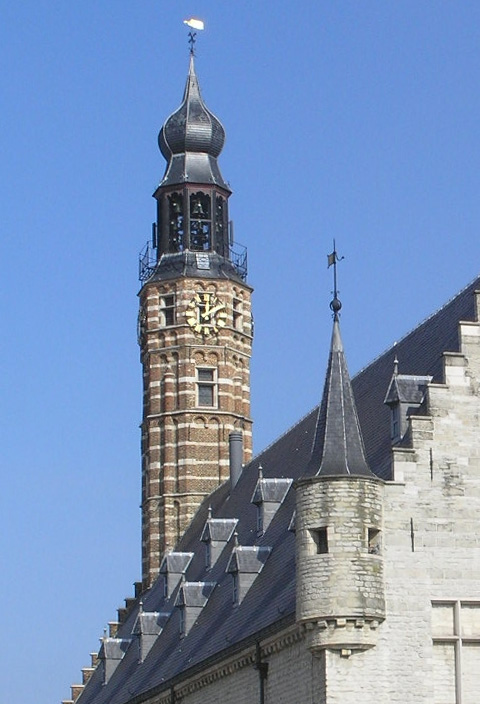
Belfry of old town hall

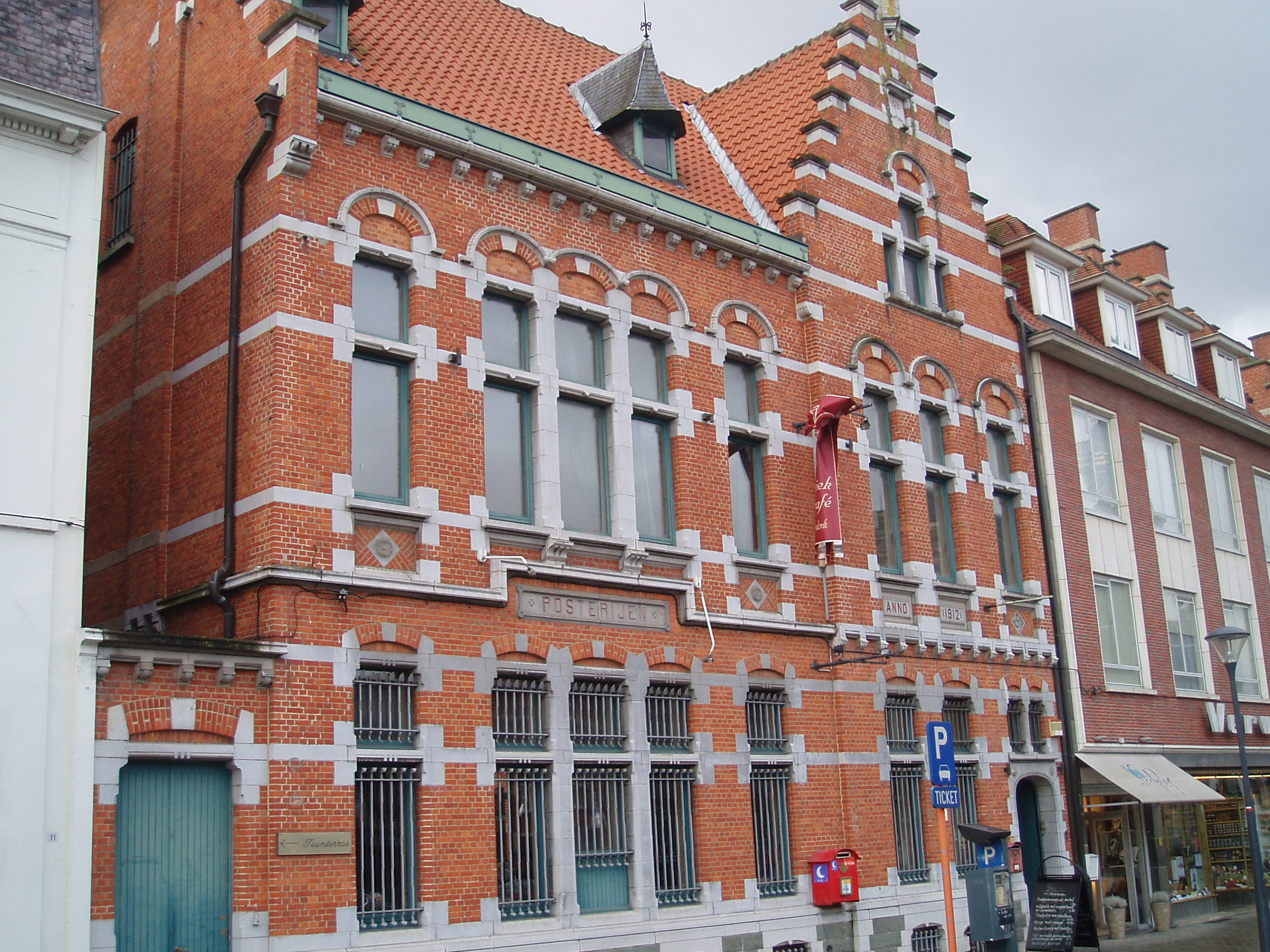
Former Post office in the Market square

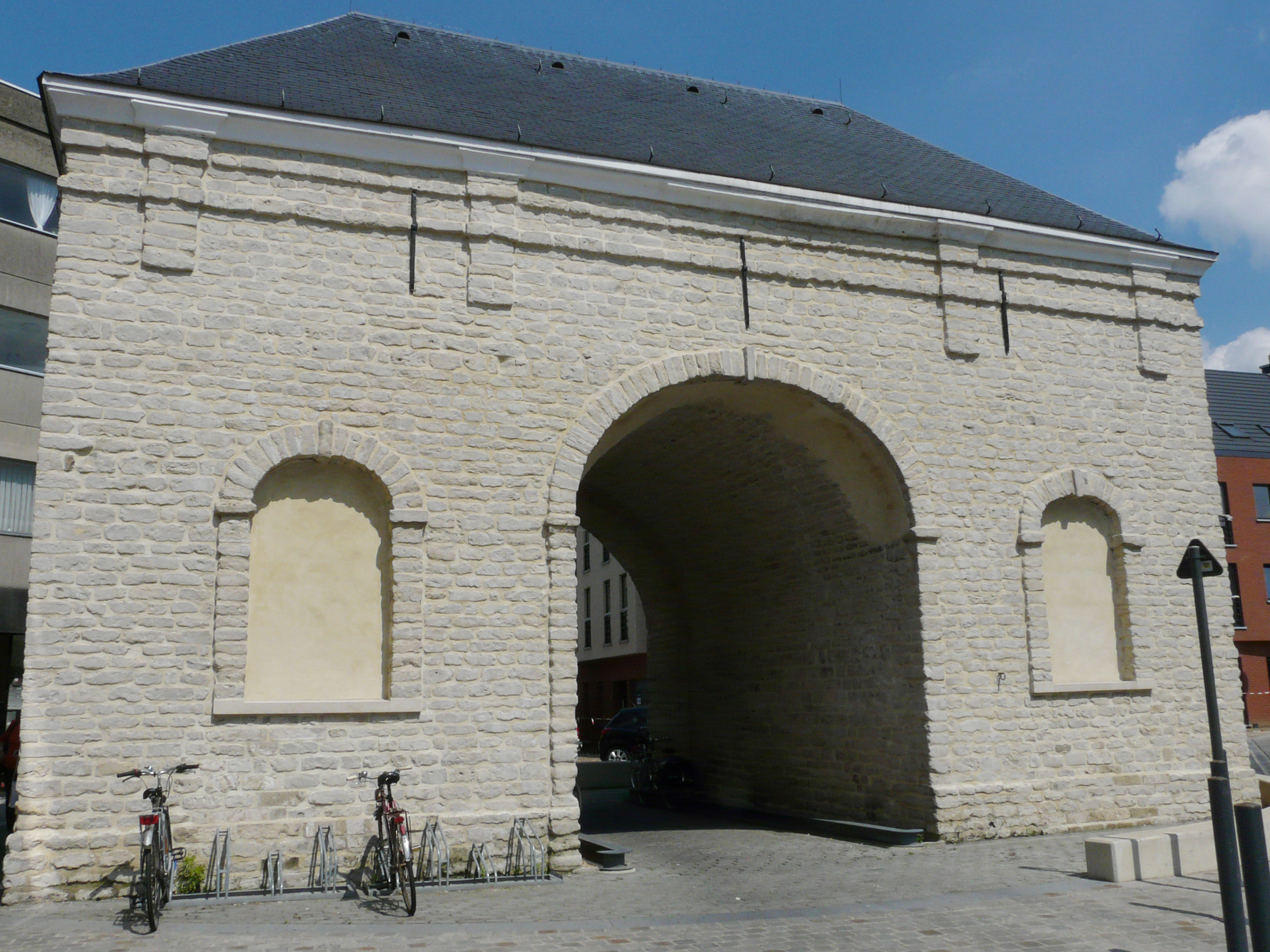
City gate

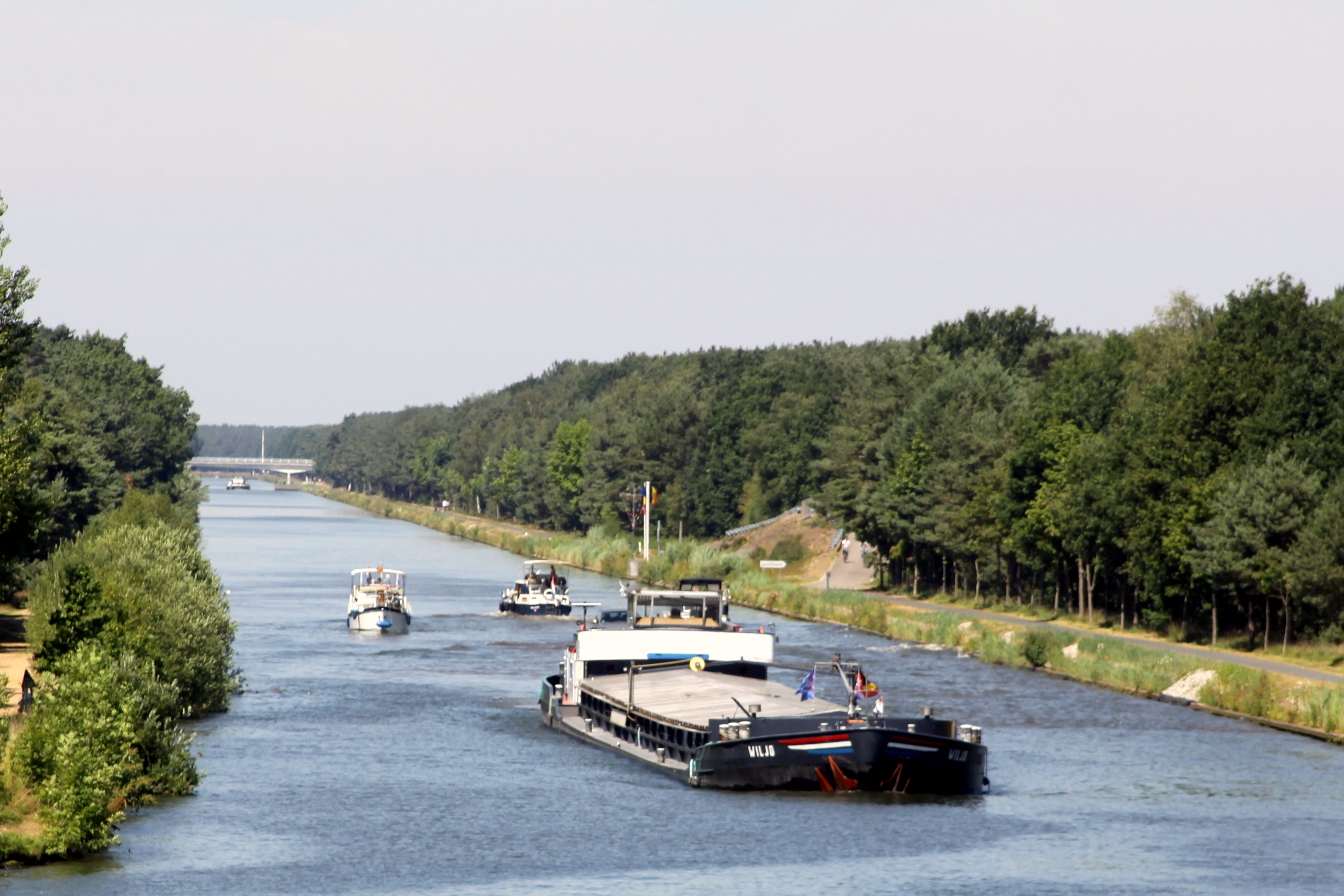
Bocholt-Herentals Canal

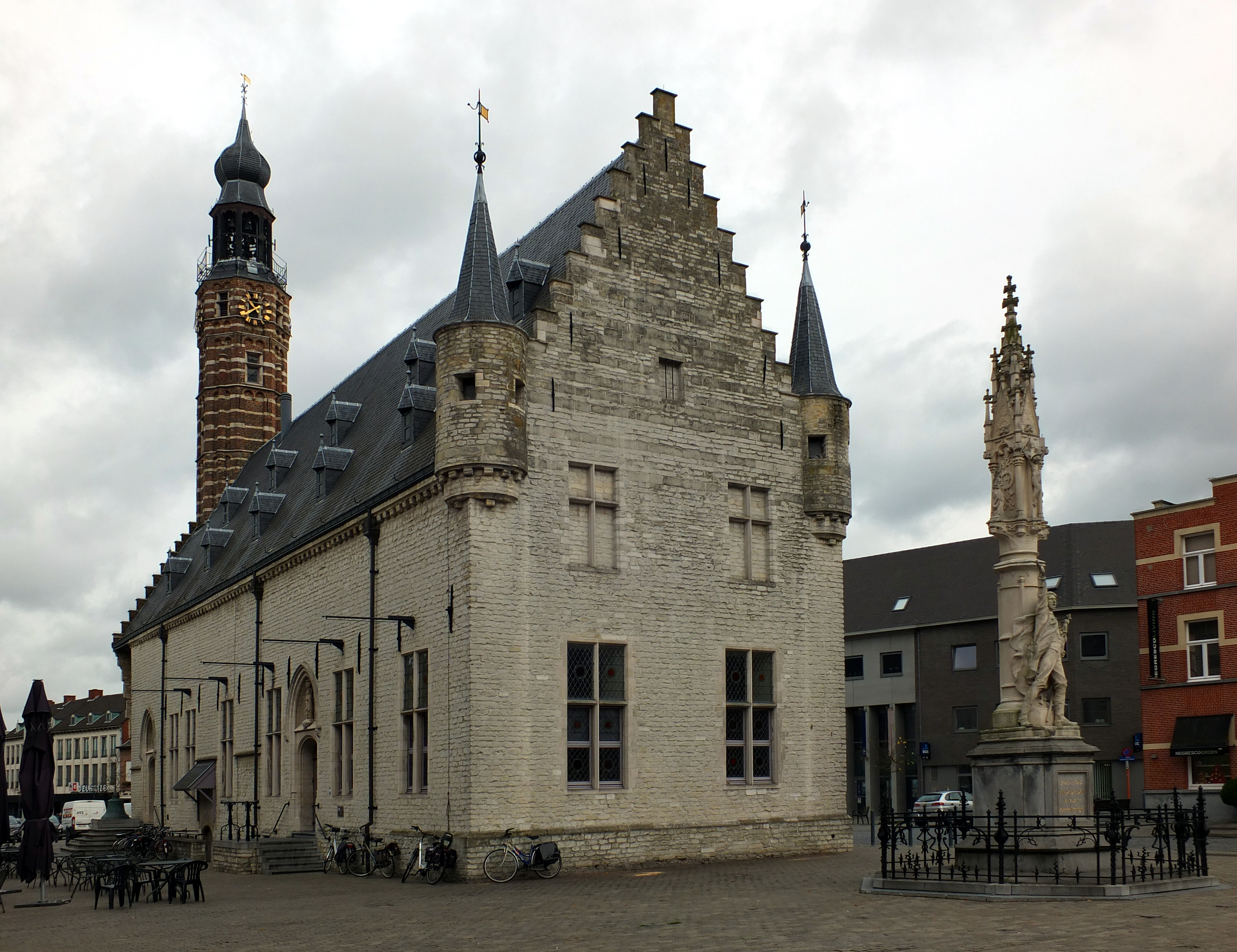
The old town hall and the Monument for the 'Farmers Rising'
