= Bossenstein Castle =

Castle in Belgium

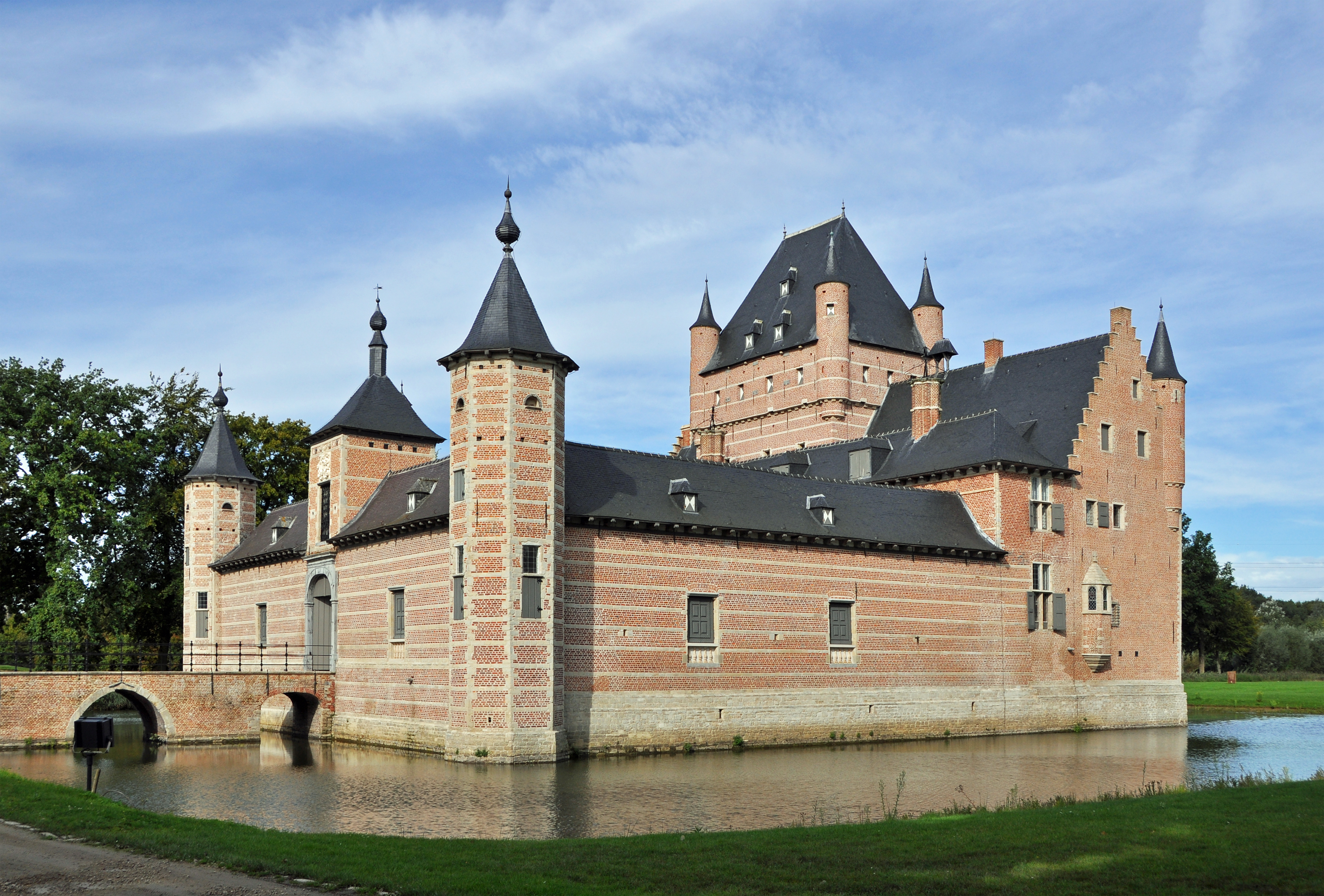

- Location within Belgium

General information
- Location: Broechem, Antwerp, Belgium
- Coordinates: 51.1928°N 4.5957°E
- Construction started: 14th century
- Construction stopped: 17th century

Bossenstein Castle is a château in the village of Broechem, Flemish Region, Belgium, which is a part of the municipality of Ranst.

== History ==
The castle was first mentioned in 1346 owned by Joannes van den Bossche who gave his name to the castle. The oldest part of the Bossenstein Castle is the keep which dates from the 14th century. The castle was owned by the Van Berchem family. In 1655, the castle was extended. In 1906, the Bossenstein Castle was extensively restored. Nowadays it is owned by a golf and polo club.

== See also ==
- List of castles in Belgium
