= Bocholt–Herentals Canal =

Canal in Belgium

Coordinates: 51.1869°N 5.5664°E

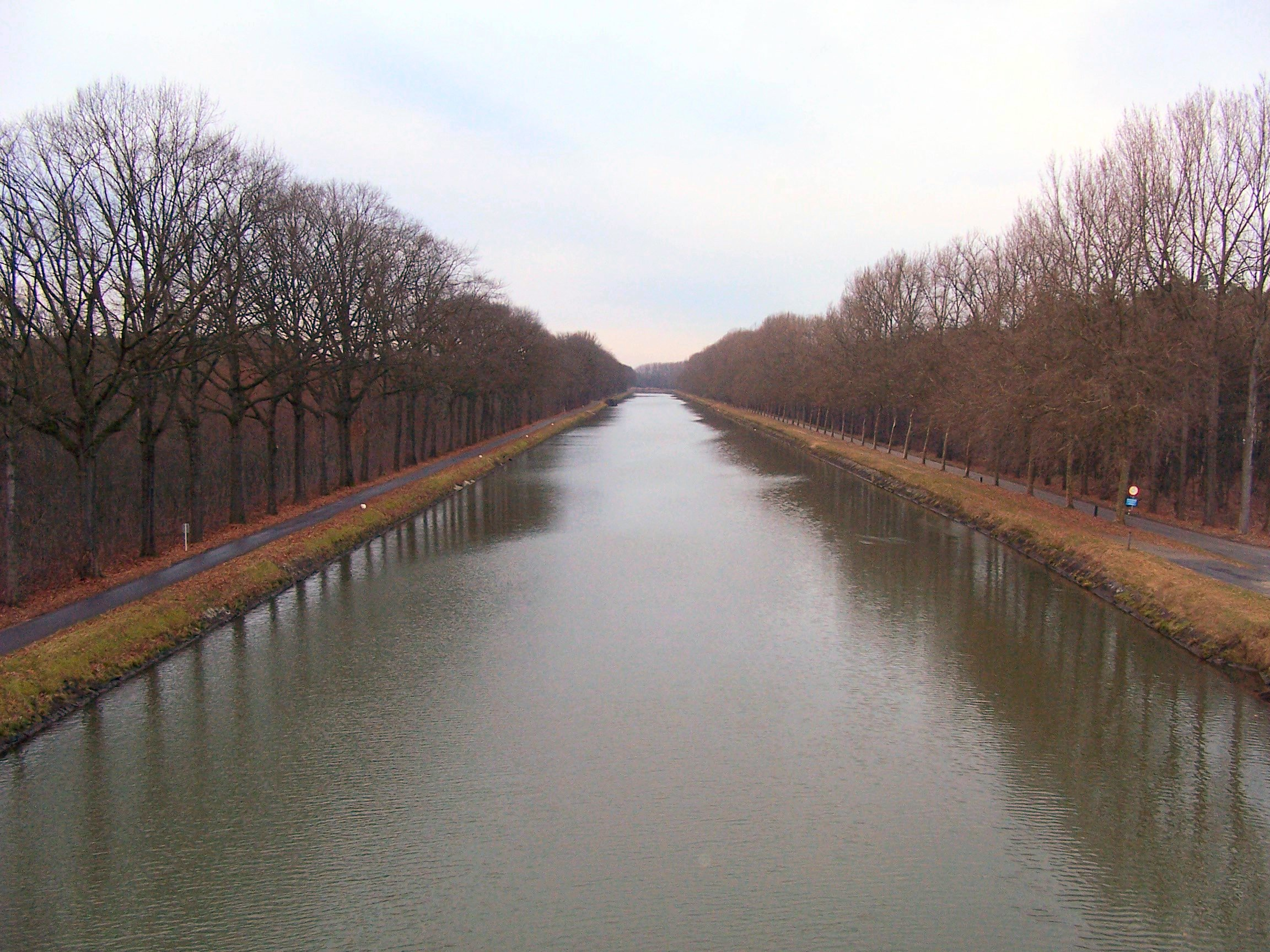
- The canal near Sint-Huibrechts-Lille
- Interactive map of Bocholt–Herentals Canal

Specifications
- Locks: 7

History
- Principal engineer: Kümmer
- Construction began: 1843
- Date of first use: 1846

Geography
- Start point: Bocholt
- End point: Herentals

The Bocholt–Herentals Canal (also known locally as the Kempisch Kanaal or the Maas-Scheldekanaal) is a canal in Belgium that links the Zuid-Willemsvaart at Bocholt with the Albert Canal in Herentals, with a length of slightly over 60 kilometres. It is one of the seven canals linking the rivers Meuse and Scheldt.

During the Second World War the canal was an important launch point for Operation Market Garden.

== History ==
The canal was created as part of the link from the river Scheldt to the Meuse that Napoleon Bonaparte planned as the Grand Canal du Nord, but only the stretches Lommel-Beringen and Venlo-Neuss were built, with a part of the present Zuid-Willemsvaart between Lanaken and Bocholt.

Linking the Scheldt with the Meuse remained important though, to serve the heavy industry in and around Liège. The 1807 Treaty of Fontainebleau added Lommel to the national territory, in exchange for Luyksgestel, this removed the last obstacle. The canal was created by one Kümmer starting in 1843, construction took three years. The canal connected to the Zuid-Willemsvaart near Bocholt and to the river Nete near Herentals. Apart from its transportation function, the canal also served to irrigate the dry Kempen region with water from the Meuse.

The canal was enlarged, both in width and in draught, in 1928. As a link between Scheldt and Meuse, the canal lost much of its importance when the Albert Canal was opened in 1940: this was shorter and faster, and offered greater capacity. Some industry had already been settled however, and was to stay: one example is the Umicore (Union Minière) zinc works in Overpelt, dating from 1888.

== Locks ==
The difference in height between Bocholt and Herentals is 33 meters, which means the canal consists of 10 locks. These locks mostly remain in their original condition, except for "Sas 10" which dates back to the 1930s. Due to significant differences in altitude, staircase locks were constructed up until "Sas 3" (1A, 2A, and 3A). They eventually fell out of favor, which meant the old locks fell into disuse. Conventional locks were built next to the old ones around the 1920s (1N, 2N, and 3N).

Number	Location	Length × width (m)	Vertical lift (m)
1N	Blauwe Kei, Lommel	55 x 7,50	4,30
2N	Rauw, Mol	55 x 7,50	4,30
3N	Rauw, Mol	55 x 7,50	4,31
4	Witgoor, Dessel	50 x 7	1,91
5	Witgoor, Dessel	50 x 7	2,13
6	Millegem, Mol	50 x 7	1,93
7	Oude-Aard, Geel	50 x 7	2,49
8	Ten Aard, Geel	50 x 7	2,03
9	Larum, Geel	50 x 7	1,99
10	Herentals	55 x 7,50	7,51

== Operation Market Garden ==
On 10 September 1944 British troops managed to capture bridge number 9 in Lommel intact. This cut off the retreat of German soldiers, who were heavily fighting a bit to the South, in Hechtel. In spite of fervent fighting the Germans could not recapture the bridge. For one week, the front line was on the canal, from Neerpelt to Lommel. On 17 September, British forces started Operation Market Garden from bridge number 9, dubbing it Joe's Bridge.

== Links with other canals ==
Besides the Albert Canal and the Zuid-Willemsvaart, the canal also connects to some other canals; these were built soon after it, creating a network of canals in the Kempen area.

- Canal Dessel-Turnhout-Schoten: in Dessel
- Canal Dessel-Kwaadmechelen: in Dessel
- Beverlo Canal: in Lommel.

== Recreational use ==
Recently, the canal gained importance for recreation, given the increasing number of yachts on the canals of Belgium and the Netherlands. Berthings were created in Herentals, Geel-Ten Aard, Lommel-Kolonie and Neerpelt. Like on many waterways, each side of the canal has a good quality cyclepath over the full length; these also are mainly meant for recreational use.
