= Broechem =

- Village
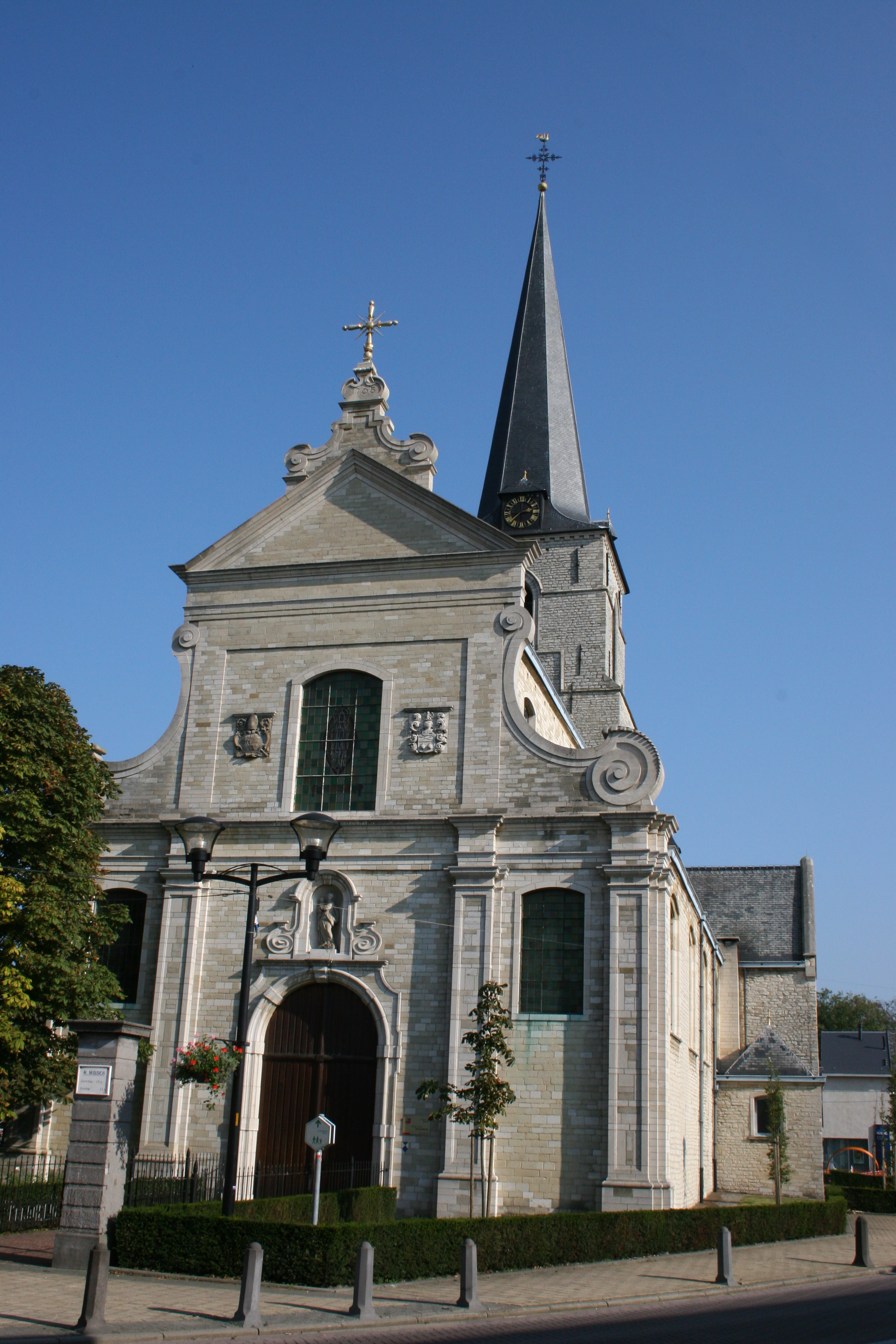
- Church of Our Lady in Broechem.

- Location in Belgium
- Coordinates: 51.18122°N 4.60186°E
- Country: Belgium
- Region: Flemish Region
- Province: Antwerp
- Municipality: Ranst

Area
  - Total: 11.77 km^{2} (4.54 sq mi)

Population (2021)
  - Total: 4,142
  - Density: 351.9/km^{2} (911.4/sq mi)
- Time zone: CET

Broechem is a part of the municipality of Ranst in Antwerp Province, Flemish Region, Belgium. The village is located on the highest point of the region.

== Toponymy ==
The town's name is derived from the Old Dutch "broek" (wetland) and "heem" (house, building). The compound name "Broekhem" then transposed into "Broechem", the name it bears today.

== History ==
The village was first mentioned as Polypticon in 868 or 869. The village was part of the abbey of Tongerlo. In 1542, the village was plundered and set on fire by the troops of Maarten van Rossum. Between 1909 and 1912, the Fortress of Broechem was constructed, and was the scene of heavy fighting in the Siege of Antwerp during World War I.

Broechem was an agricultural village with many orchards. In 1977, the municipality was merged into Ranst.

== Attractions ==
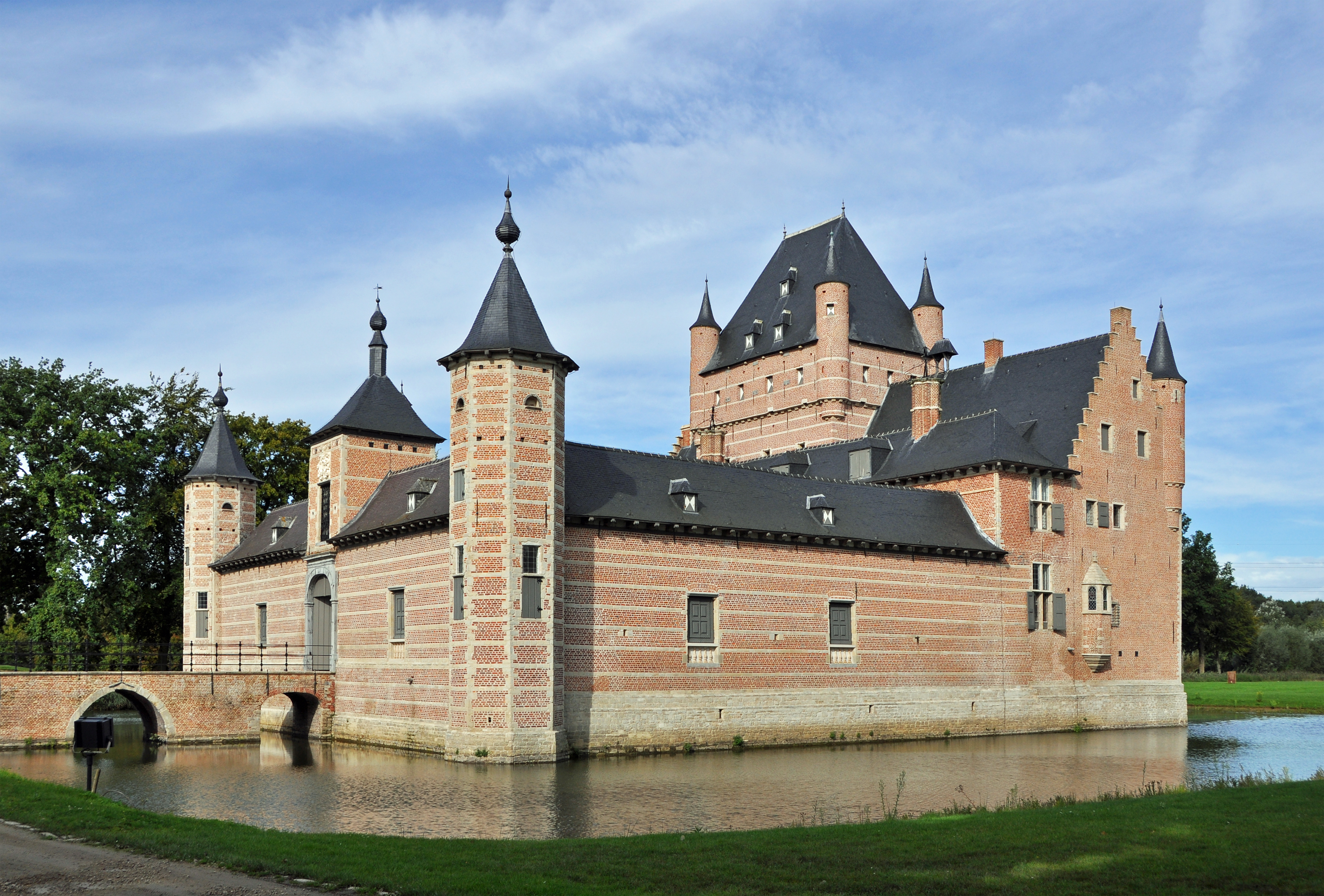
Bossenstein Castle

The oldest part of the Bossenstein Castle is the keep which dates from the 14th century. The castle used to be owned by the Van Berchem family. In 1655, the castle was extended. In 1906, the Bossenstein Castle was extensively restored. Nowadays it is owned by a golf and polo club.

== Notable people ==
- Jürgen Cavens (1978), football player.
- Tuur Dierckx (1995), football player.
