= Oelegem =

- Village
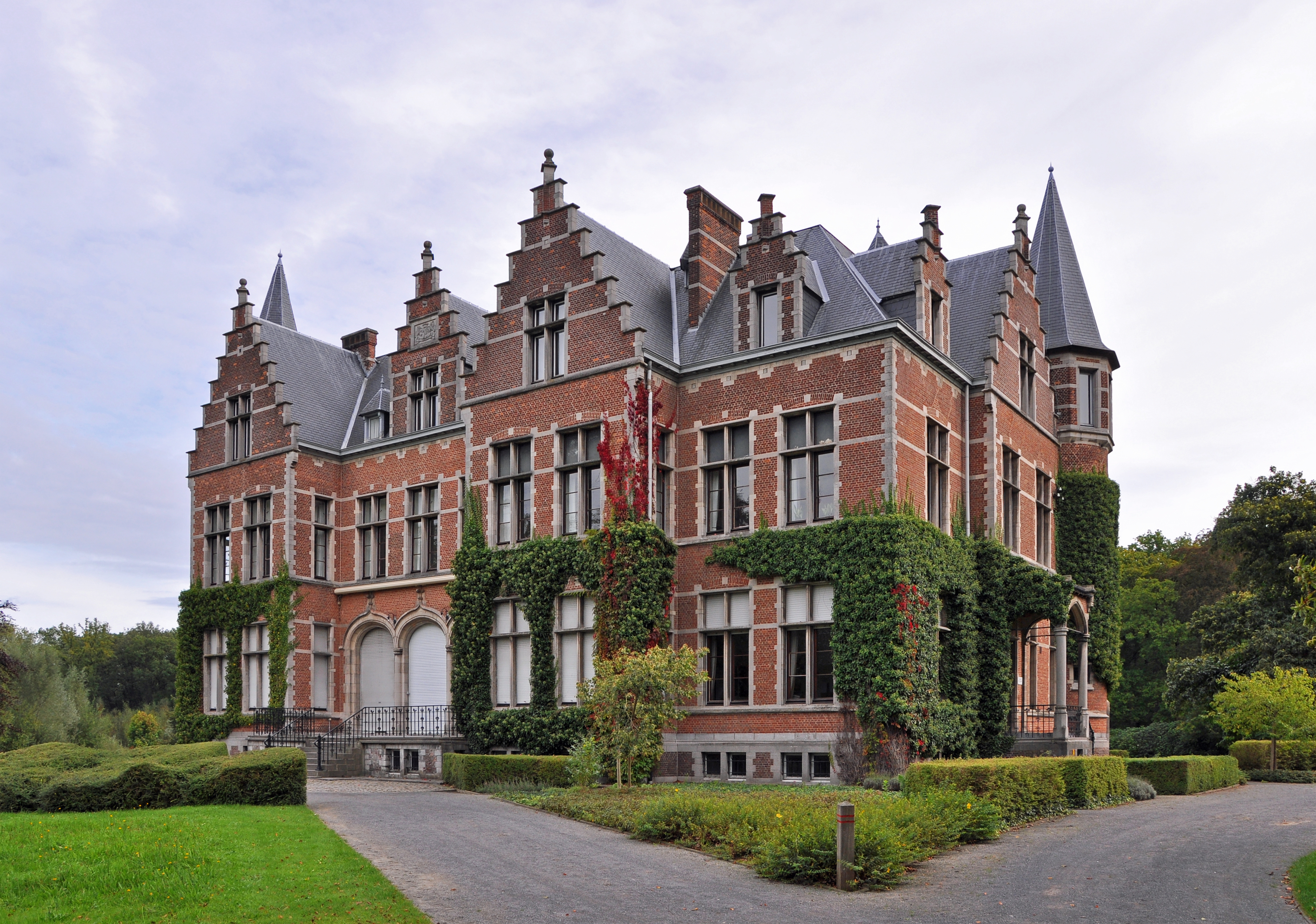
- Vrieselhof Castle

- Location in Belgium
- Coordinates: 51.2112°N 4.5903°E
- Country: Belgium
- Region: Flemish Region
- Province: Antwerp
- Municipality: Ranst

Area
  - Total: 13.09 km^{2} (5.05 sq mi)

Population (2021)
  - Total: 4,881
  - Density: 372.9/km^{2} (965.8/sq mi)
- Time zone: CET

Oelegem is a village and deelgemeente (sub-municipality) of the municipality of Ranst in the province of Antwerp, Belgium. The village is located about 14 kilometres (8.7 mi) east of the city of Antwerp.

== History ==
Oelegem is located on the border of the Campine region with the loam area of the Nete. A Roman settlement was discovered dating between the 1st century BC and 3rd century AD. The village was first mentioned in 1161 when the parish became part of the Tongerlo Abbey. Around 1701, four fortresses were built by the French.

During the 20th century, Oelegem was the site of the large scale constructions. Fort van Oelegem was built between 1909 and 1913, the Albert Canal was dug, and the motorway E313 from Antwerp to Liège was constructed. Vrieselhof Castle was completely destroyed during World War I, and later rebuilt in Flemish Renaissance Revival style.

Oelegem was an independent municipality until 1977 when it was merged into Ranst. In April 1978, the body of Charles Bracht, a former alpine skier who had participated in the 1936 Winter Olympics, was discovered. Bracht had become a wealthy business man, and was kidnapped in March 1978. He was shot and the body was dumped in a marsh near Oelegem.

== Buildings and sights ==
The Our Lady church is a three aisled basilica-like church in Gothic Revival style. The tower dated from the 15th century. In 1605, a spire was added, but was damaged in 1669, and replaced in 1671 by the current spire. The church was enlarged between 1848 and 1850. On 7 October 1914, the church burnt down and was rebuilt between 1921 and 1924. The tower and church were again damaged during World War II and restored in 1948.

The Fort van Oelegem was built between 1909 and 1913 as an extension of the National Redoubt to protect Antwerp. It is one of the largest and most heavily defended fortresses of Belgium. Construction was not completed when Germany invaded Belgium, however the fortress was bypassed and saw no action. During World War II, it fell in German hands in 1940 and was used to store supplies during the war. The fortress is open for visitors and is one of the most important winter areas for bats.

The grist mill Molen van Oelegem was built between 1845 and 1846. It burnt down in 1940. By 1978, the wind mill had become dilapidated. In 1987, 1990 and 1997, it was restored to working order, but has been out of order since 2018 after a sail broke.

== Notable people ==
- Karel Kesselaers (born 1959), former footballer

== Gallery ==
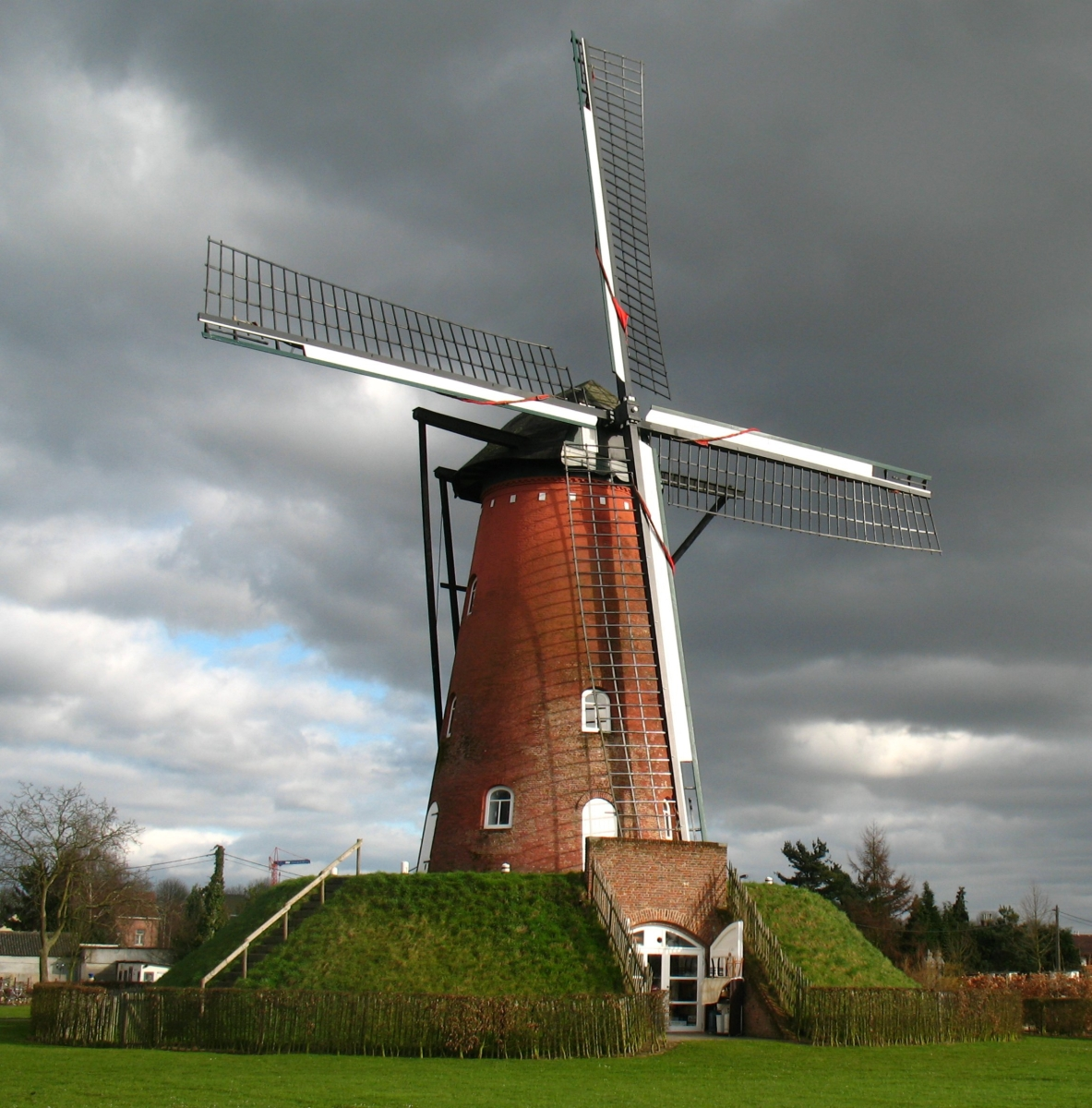
Windmill Molen van Oelegem

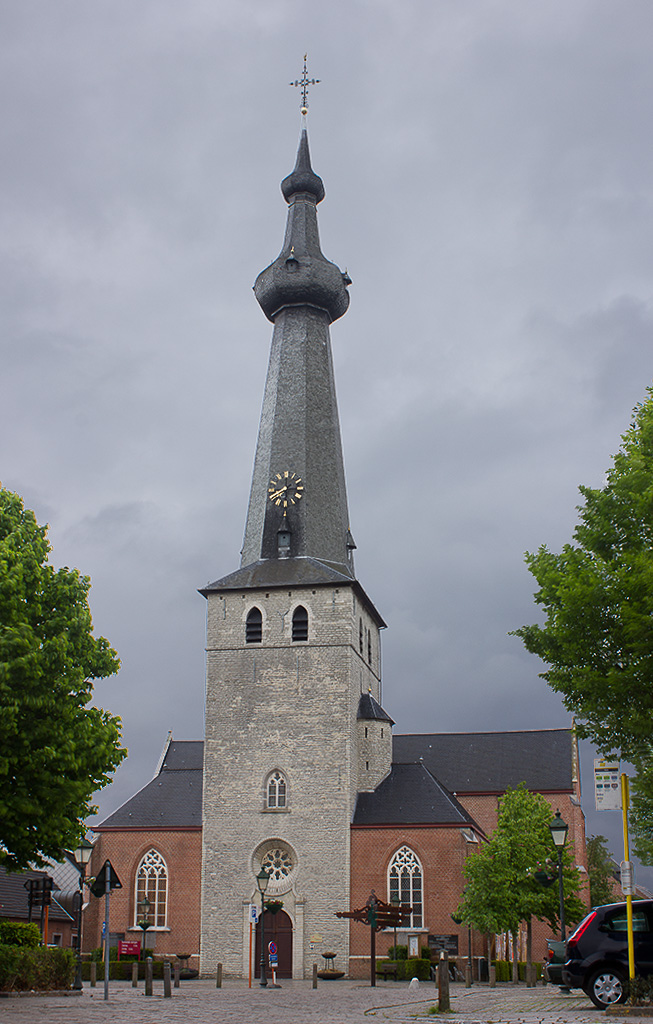
Our Lady Church

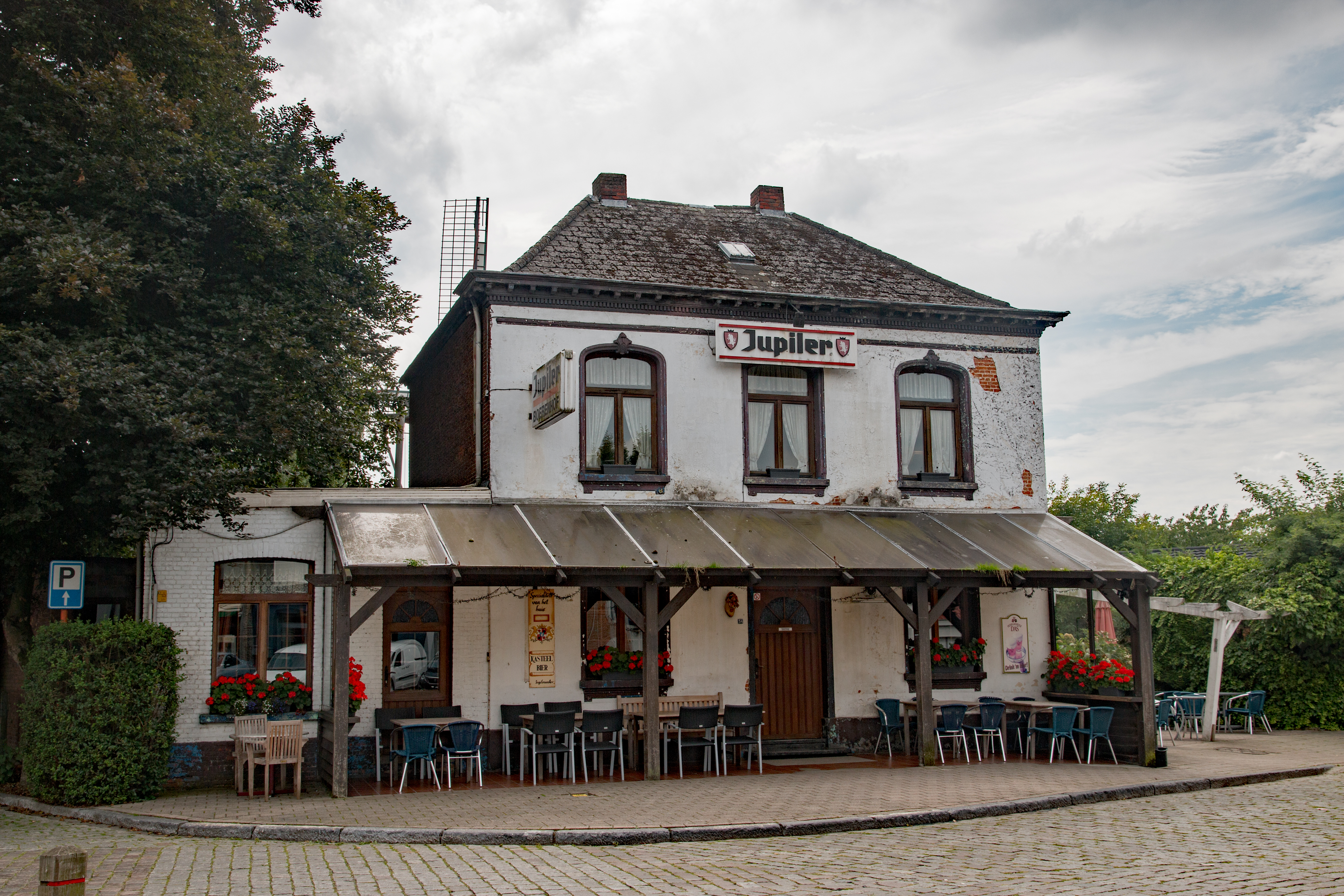
Pub in Oelegem

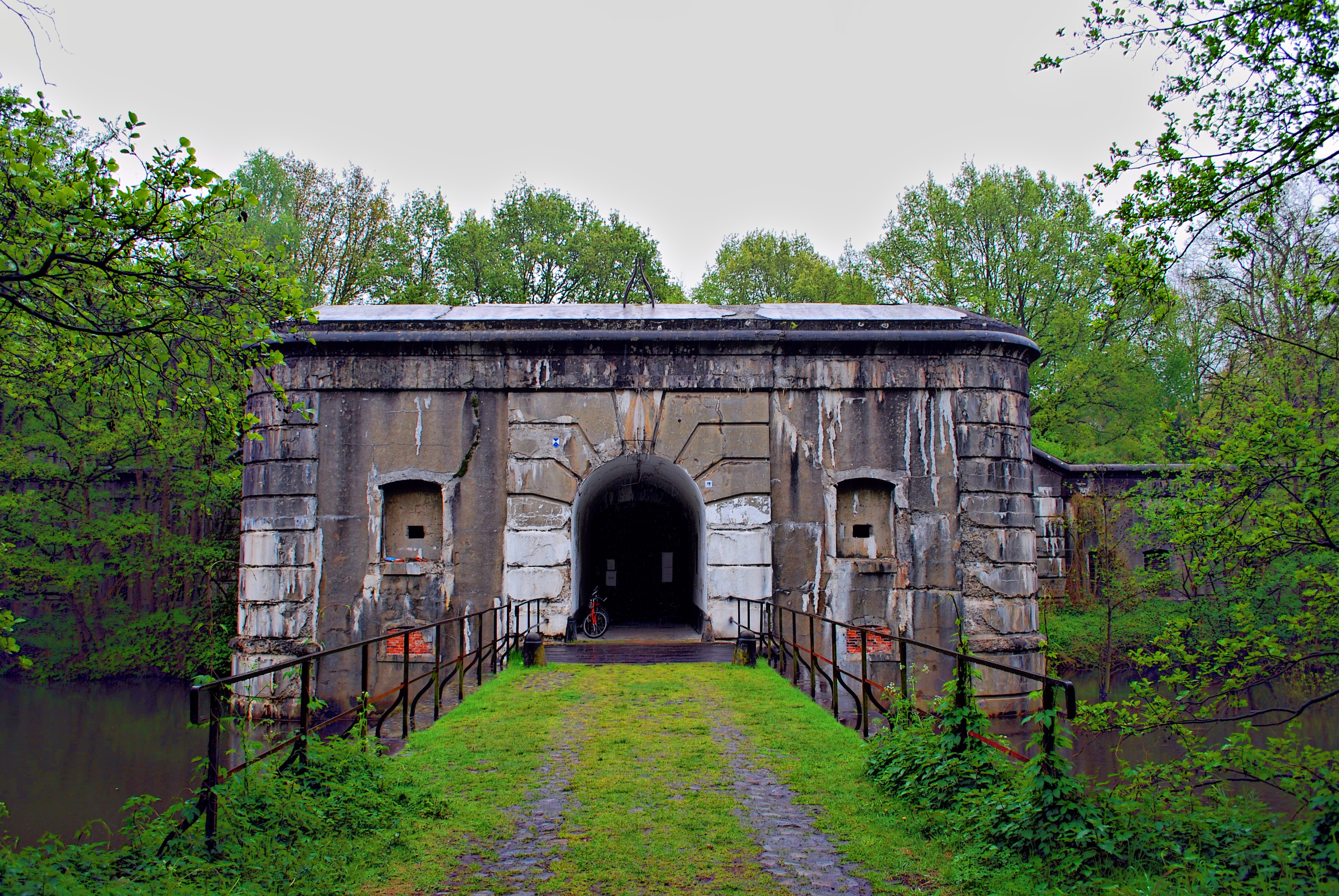
Fort van Oelegem
