= Joe's Bridge =

Nickname for a bridge in Lommel, Belgium

Coordinates: 51°14′22″N 5°22′43″E

Joe's Bridge is the nickname given to Bridge No.9 on the Bocholt-Herentals Canal, in the Belgian city of Lommel just south of the Belgian-Dutch border. The bridge was captured by British troops in September 1944, becoming the springboard for the ground offensive of Operation Market-Garden.

== Capture ==
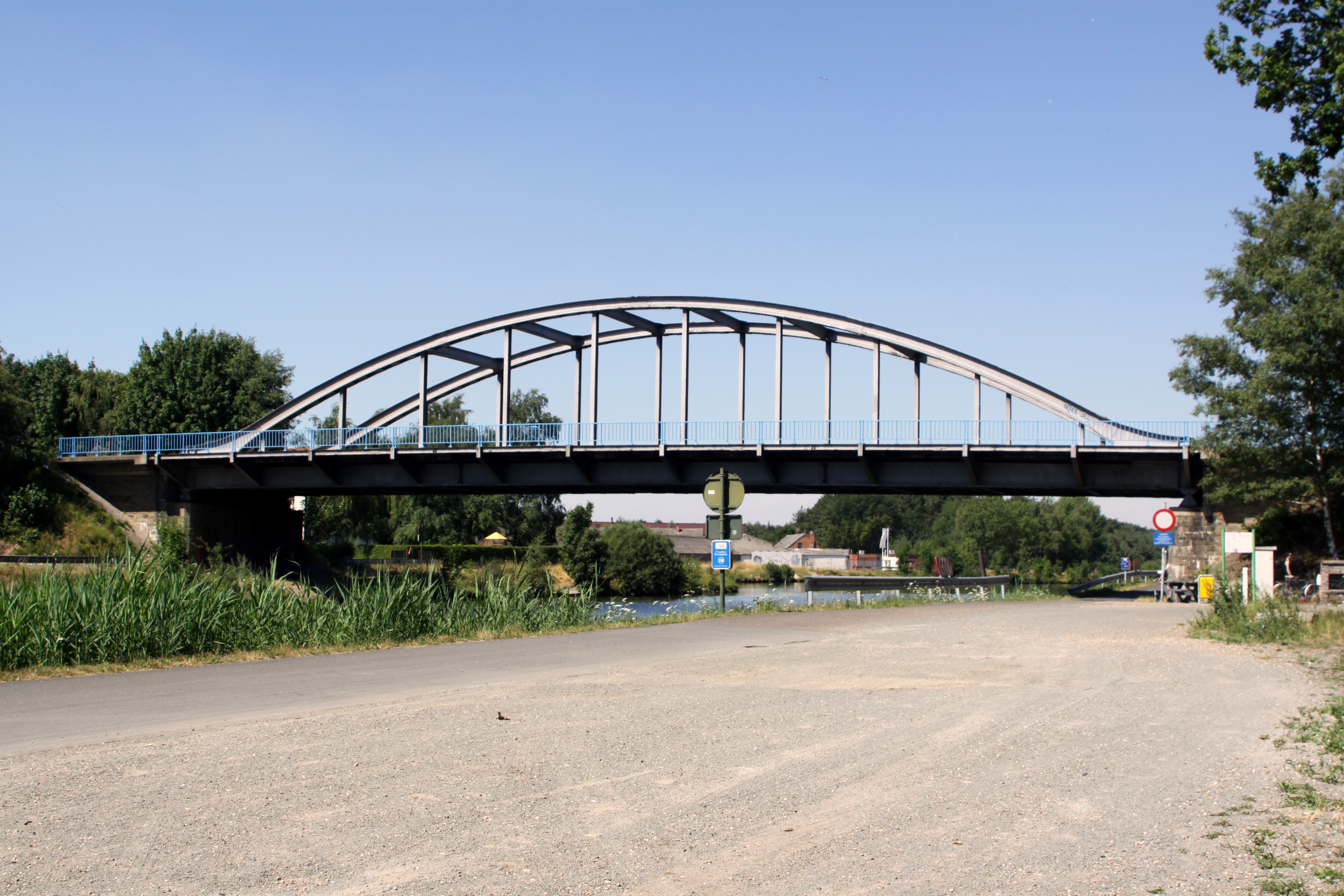
Joe's Bridge in 2010

While the Welsh Guards engaged the German forces around Hechtel, the Irish Guards advanced rapidly north-east through the villages of Eksel, Overpelt and Neerpelt, and launched their combined infantry-tank assault, with artillery support, from the grounds of the zinc processing factory in Overpelt and took the bridge undamaged. The capture of the bridge completed the encirclement of German troops in Hechtel. German units tried for some days to recapture the bridge from the north but were driven off, once with bayonets. Once the bridge was secure, men of the 615th Field Squadron, Royal Engineers, set about repairing it, while the Irish Guards secured a bridgehead along the N69 main road towards Valkenswaard. Some 1.9 mi (3 km) to the west, in the center of Lommel, SS troops had placed 40 randomly selected Belgian civilians in the street, at machine gun-point, as a human shield. The swift advance of the British from the east prevented a massacre. The Germans held the north side of the canal up to 17 September, apart from the area around the bridge. The bridge became known as "Joe's Bridge", after Lieutenant–Colonel Joe Vandeleur, or possibly because the Royal Engineers troop who repaired it was known as "Joe's Troop".

== Post-war ==
The bridge was rebuilt after the Second World War and a memorial below the southern edge of the bridge records its famous name. The Irish Guards Memorial is on the northern bank, on a side-road off the road to Valkenswaard. Joe's Bridge is on the "Airborne trail", a 140 mi (225 km) footpath from Lommel to Arnhem, created as a permanent reminder of Operation Market-Garden by the Dutch hiking association Ollandse Lange Afstand Tippelaars (OLAT). It was officially opened in September 2004, during the festivities marking the 60th anniversary of the liberation.

== See also ==
- Operation Market Garden
