= Hidrodoe =

Science Museum in Belgium

Hidrodoe is a science museum dedicated to water and located in the Netepark Herentals, Belgium. The central part of Hidrodoe consists of Waterworld where the visitor can have experiences and perform experiments with regard to water. The Waterworld itself comprises the Drop, the What Is Water Zone, the History Cave, the Landscape and the Aqua Station.

== History ==
Hidrodoe was founded by Pidpa (Provinciale en Intercommunale Drinkwatermaatschappij van de Provincie Antwerpen) the water supply company of the Antwerp province. Hidrodoe was declared open to the public on the World Day for Water 2003.

== Sources ==
- Record aantal bezoekers voor Hidrodoe (Dutch)
- Hidrodoe (Pidpa)
- Hidrodoe (Flanders)
