= Karel Kesselaers =

Belgian footballer

Personal information
- Date of birth: September 3, 1959 (age 67)
- Place of birth: Oelegem, Belgium
- Position: Defender

Youth career
- KSK Oelegem

Senior career*
Years	Team	Apps	(Gls)
1973–1977	KSK Oelegem		
1977–1988	KV Mechelen		
1988–1989	K.S.K. Beveren	12	(1)
1989–1990	R. Francs Borains		
1990–1991	V.C. Herentals		
1991–1993	K.S.K. Zandhoven		
1993–1994	KSK Oelegem		

International career^{‡}
- Belgium Under-21
- * Club domestic league appearances and goals as of 11 November 2007 ‡ National team caps and goals as of 11 November 2007

Karel Kesselaers (born 3 September 1959) is a Belgian former soccer player. In 1983, he was selected as player of the season by KV Mechelen in the same year of their promotion to the Belgian League. In 1987, he won the Belgian Cup, also with KV Mechelen, and in 1988 he won the European Cup Winners Cup with the team.
