= Ranst =

- Municipality
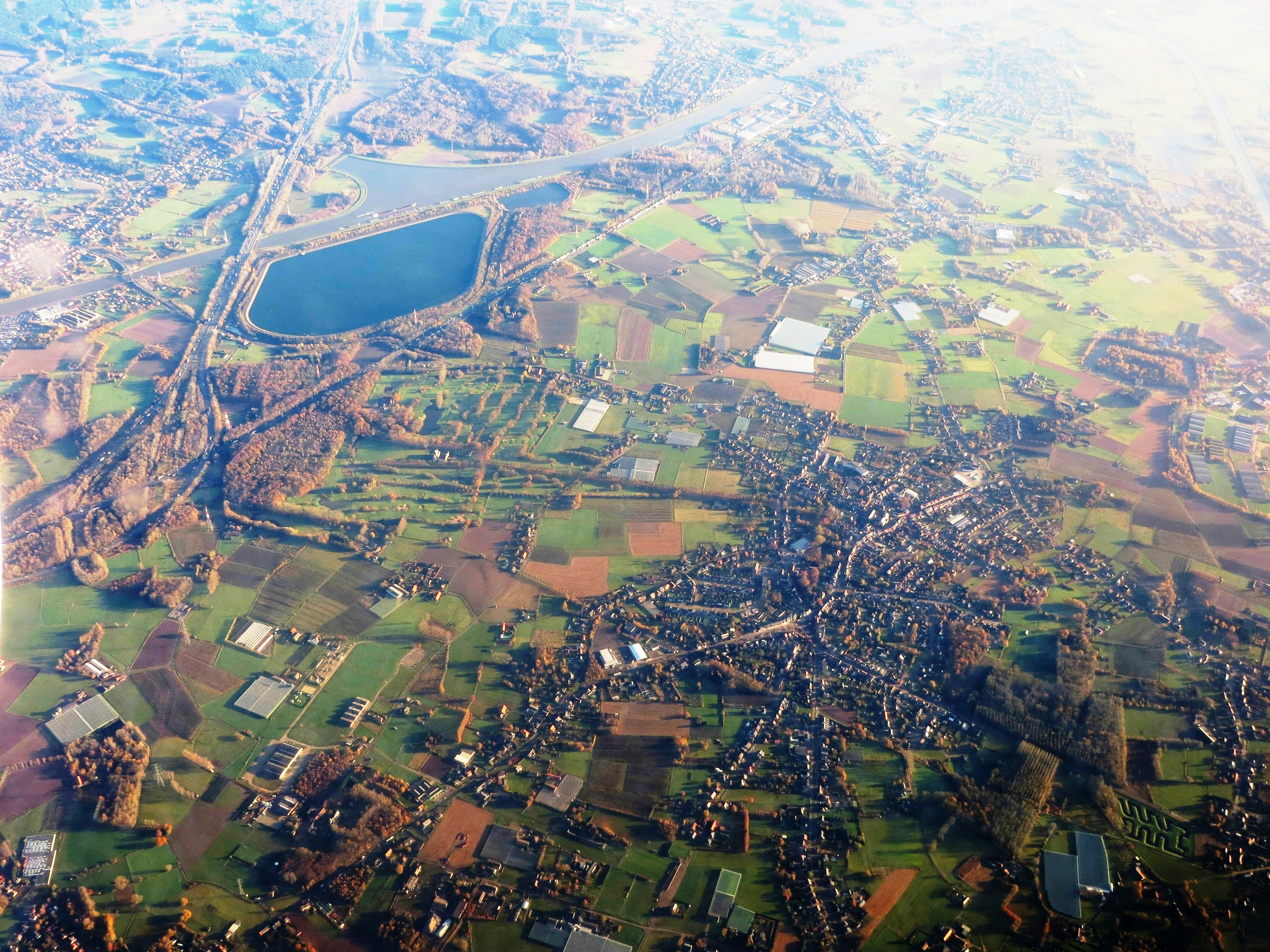

- Flag Coat of arms

- Location of Ranst in the province of Antwerp
- Interactive map of Ranst
- Location in Belgium
- Coordinates: 51°12′N 04°33′E
- Country: Belgium
- Community: Flemish Community
- Region: Flemish Region
- Province: Antwerp
- Arrondissement: Antwerp

Government
  - Mayor: Bart Goris PIT
  - Governing parties: PIT, Vlaams belang

Area
  - Total: 43.67 km^{2} (16.86 sq mi)

Population (2020-01-01)
  - Total: 19,187
  - Density: 439.4/km^{2} (1,138/sq mi)
- Postal codes: 2520
- NIS code: 11035
- Area codes: 03
- Website: www.ranst.be

Ranst (Dutch pronunciation: [rɑnst]) is a municipality in the Belgian province of Antwerp. The municipality comprises the towns of Broechem (townhall), Emblem, Oelegem, and Ranst (postoffice) proper. In 2021, Ranst had a total population of 19,249. The total area is 43.58 km^{2} (16.83 sq mi).

== Notable people ==
- Jozef Simons, (1888–1948), writer and poet, born in Oelegem.

== Partnership ==
- (Germany) Herbstein, since 1968.
