= Dessel–Turnhout–Schoten Canal =

Canal in Antwerp, Belgium

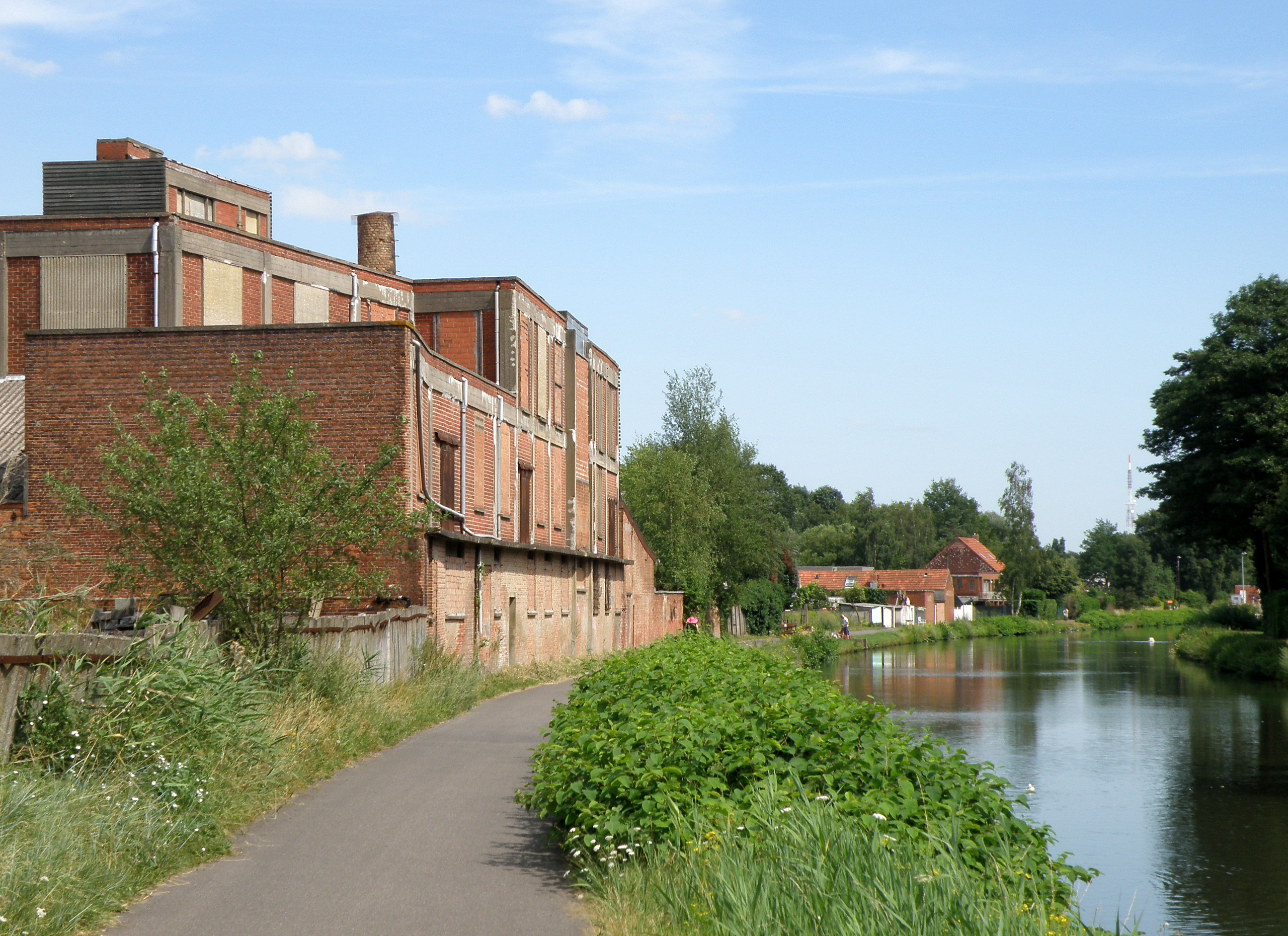
- The canal in Schoten with a bicycle trail
- Country: Belgium

Specifications
- Length: 63 km (39 miles)

Geography
- Direction: East
- Start point: Dessel
- End point: Schoten
- Beginning coordinates: 51.2345°N 5.1645°E
- Ending coordinates: 51.2386°N 4.5006°E

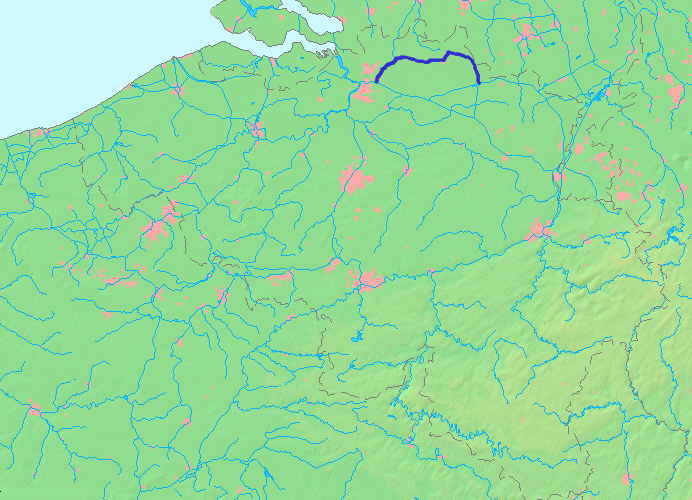
The Dessel–Turnhout–Schoten Canal connects Dessel to the Albert Canal which it joins at Schoten.

The Dessel–Turnhout–Schoten Canal is a 63 km long canal across the province of Antwerp, Belgium. It links Dessel to Schoten, where the canal flows into the Albert Canal.

Construction of the eastern section between Dessel and Turnhout canal started in 1844 and was completed a year later. The western section, linking to the Maastricht Canal (subsequently replaced by the larger and more freely navigable Albert Canal) at Schoten was started in 1854 but completed only in 1875.
