= Albert Canal =

Canal in Belgium

Coordinates: 51.0674°N 5.1907°E

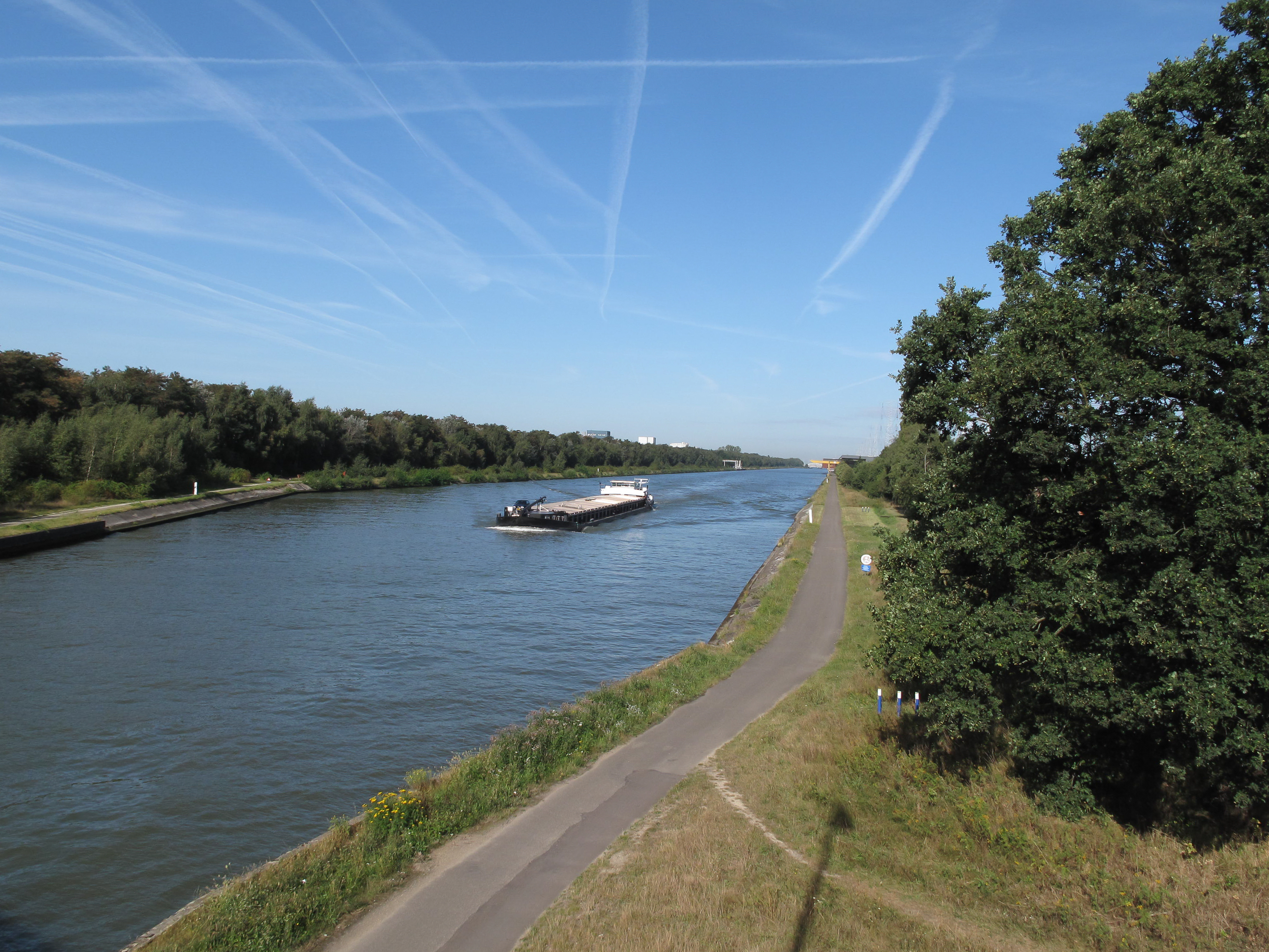
- Albert Canal in Geel

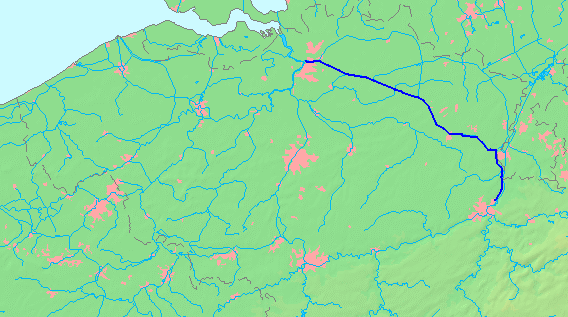
- The Albert canal connects Liège to Antwerp via Hasselt.
- Interactive map of Albert Canal

Specifications
- Length: 80.5 miles (129.6 km)
- Locks: 6

History
- Construction began: 1930
- Date of first use: 1939

Geography
- Start point: Liège
- End point: Antwerp

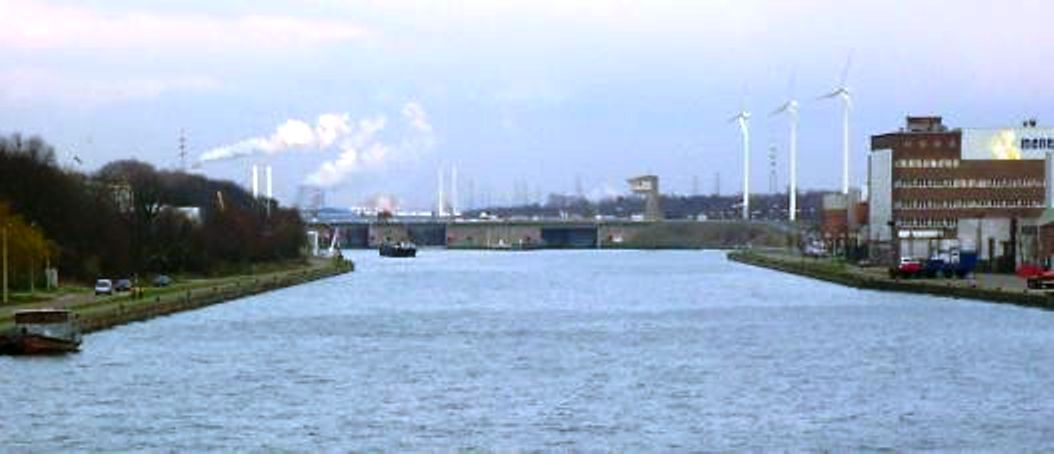
The canal in the city of Hasselt

The Albert Canal (Dutch: Albertkanaal, pronounced [ˈɑl.bərt.kaːˌnaːl]; French: Canal Albert, pronounced [kanal albɛʁ]) is a canal located in northeastern Belgium, which was named for King Albert I of Belgium. The Albert Canal connects Antwerp with Liège, and also the Meuse river with the Scheldt river. It also connects with the Dessel–Turnhout–Schoten Canal, and its total length is 129.5 kilometres (80.5 mi).

== Size and geography ==
The Albert Canal has a standard depth of 3.4 metres (11 ft) and an overhead clearance of 6.7 metres (22 ft). To allow four-stacked container traffic, bridges over the canal are currently being heightened to allow for a 9.1 metres (30 ft) overhead.

Between Antwerp and Liège, there is a difference in elevation of 56 metres (184 ft), and six sets of canal locks were needed to overcome this difference. Five canal locks each have a lift of 10 metres (33 ft), and these are located in Genk, Diepenbeek, Hasselt, Kwaadmechelen, and Olen, Belgium. The sixth lock at Wijnegem has a lift of 5.45 metres (17.9 ft).

During most of the 1930s, before the completion of the Albert Canal, it took about seven days to travel from Antwerp to Liège by water. In the 21st century, that same distance can be covered in about 18 hours.

== History ==
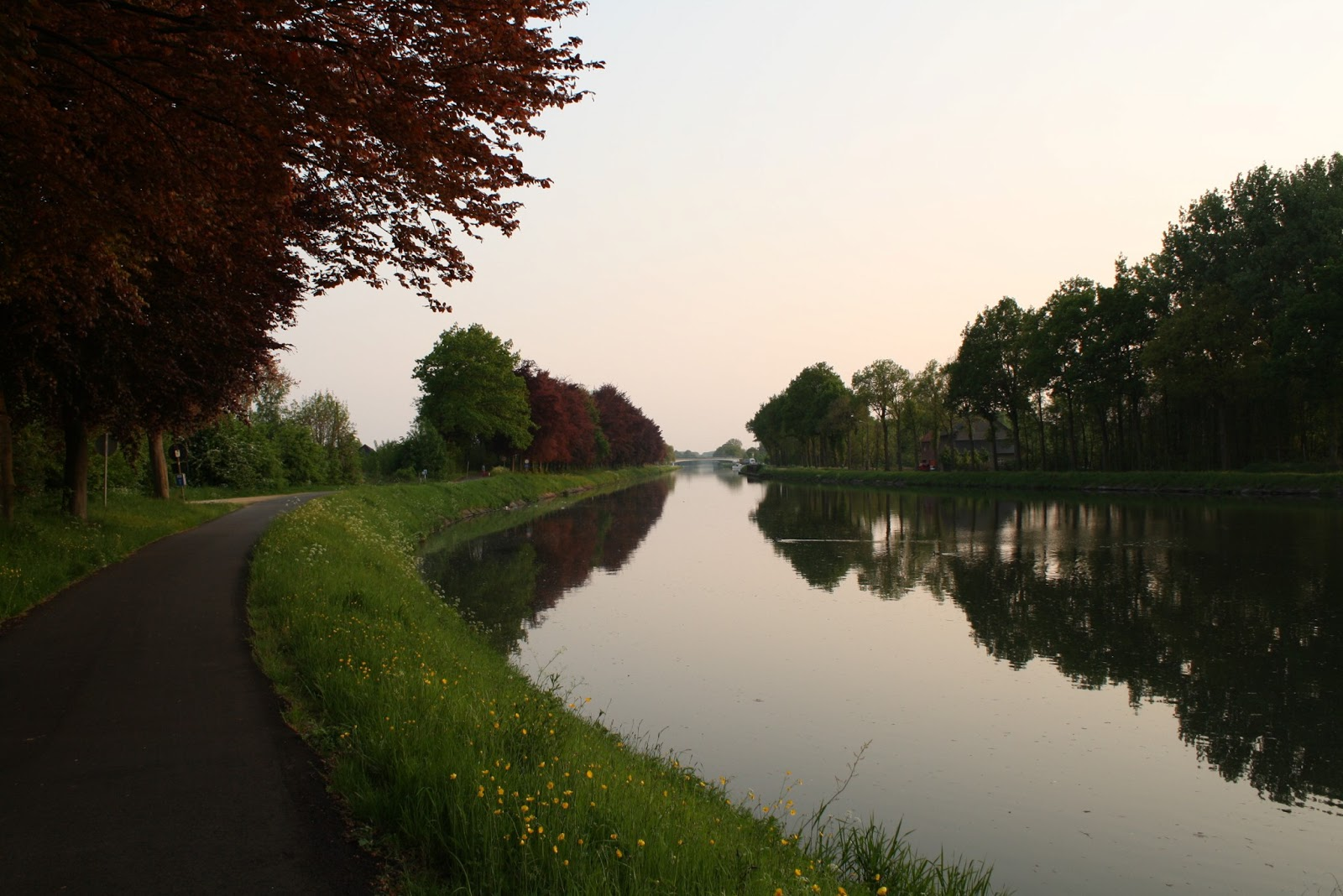
The canal near Smeermaas, Limburg

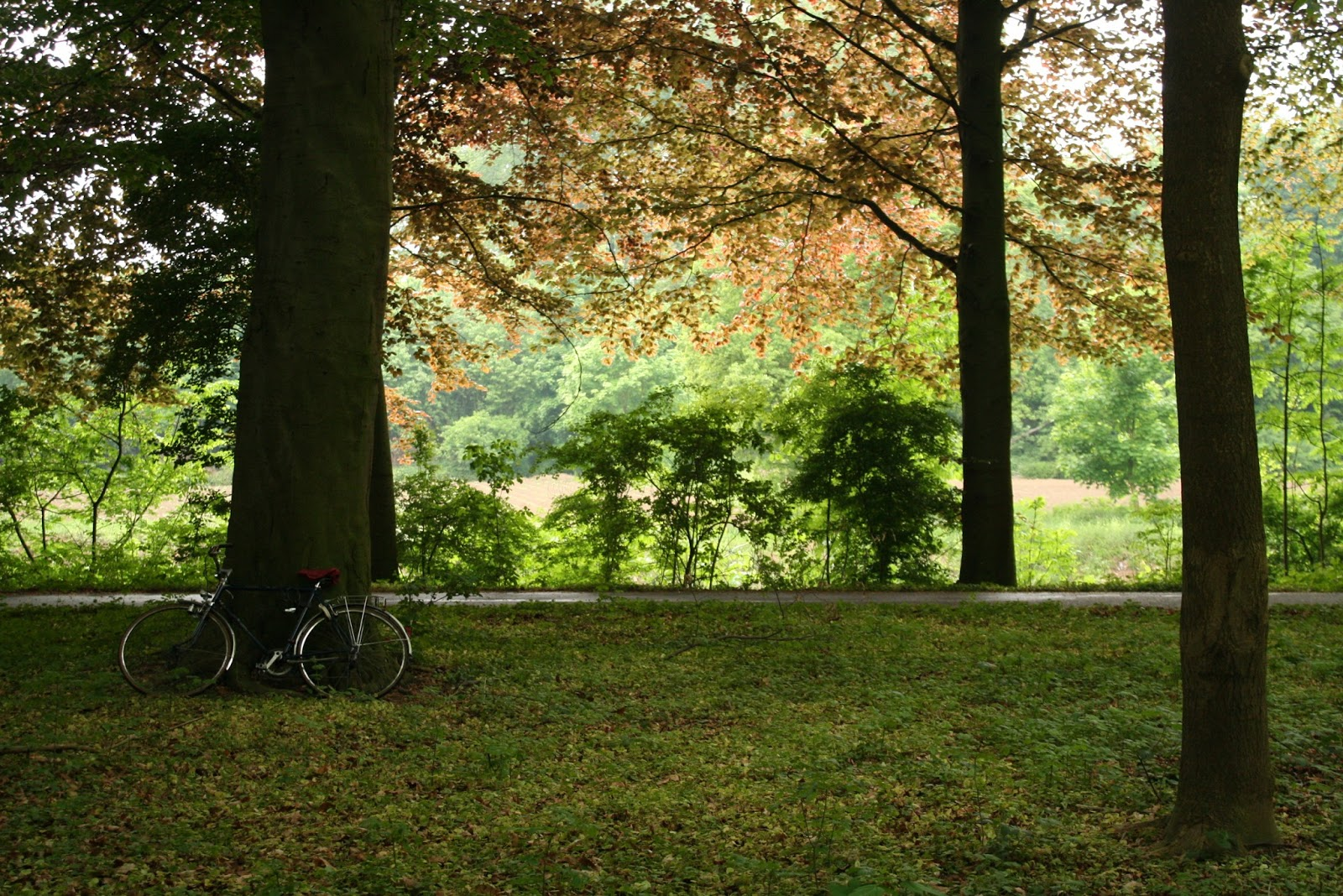
Cycling path along the canal, near Smeermaas, Limburg

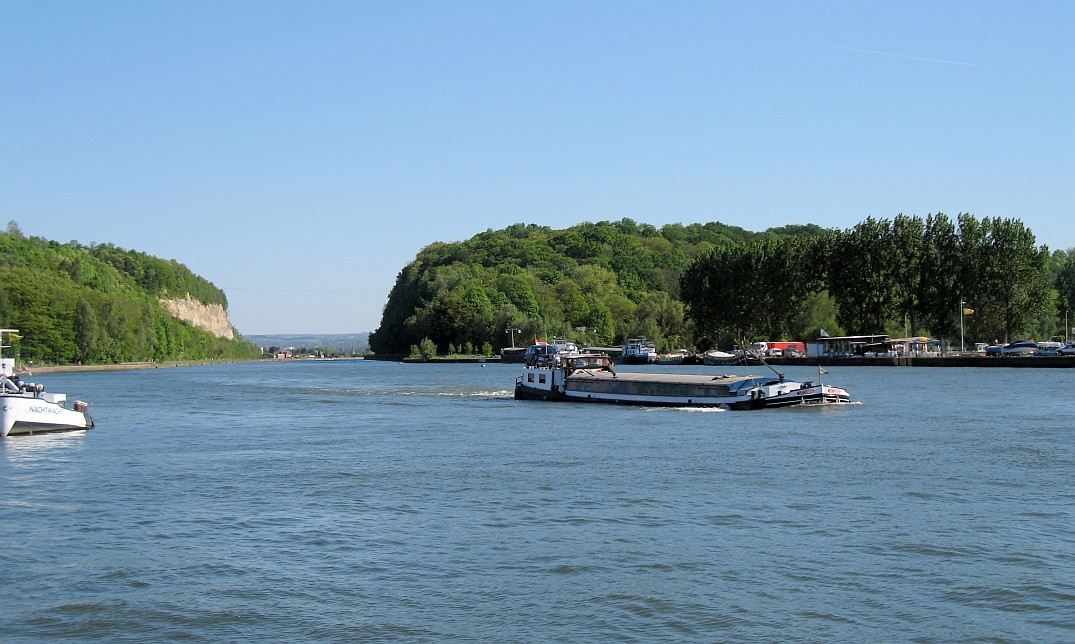
The Albert canal near Kanne, Limburg

The Albert Canal was constructed from 1930 through 1939. The German construction company Hochtief worked on the canal between 1930 and 1934, but it was completed by Belgian companies.

One of these Belgian companies was Ackermans & van Haaren. From July 1935 to February 1939, the company contributed to the construction of the Albert Canal, more specifically to the section between Kuringen (Hasselt) and Beringen, covering a distance of 13 km. These works were carried out as a subcontract for Entreprises Dumon & Vander Vin. In addition, from 10 November 1937 onwards, Ackermans & van Haaren was commissioned to clear the siphon at the Zonderikbeek, as well as other streams, of waste and stone debris. Finally, between November 1938 and January 1939, the company carried out dredging and hydraulic filling works in the large coal harbour of Zolder on behalf of the Brussels-based Compagnie Générale de Travaux (Cogetra). This harbour was connected by a 7 km railway line to the coal mines of Helchteren and Zolder.

The Albert Canal was used for the first time in 1940 but, because of World War II and the German occupation, intensive use only began later, in 1946.

During World War II, the Albert Canal functioned as a defence line. The crossing of the canal by the German forces and the destruction of Fort Eben-Emael on 11 May 1940 was a milestone in the German invasion of Belgium.

During the Liberation of Belgium by the Allies in September 1944, the Second Canadian Division was the first Allied unit to cross the Albert Canal. The British Army also crossed the Albert Canal on its way north across Belgium and into the Netherlands and the U.S. Army entered Belgium further to the east on its way to liberate the rest of Belgium, and Luxembourg, and then proceed east to invade Nazi Germany. Hence, Belgium was liberated from the south by three different armies, two of which needed to cross the Albert Canal. Though in service for some weeks, the Veldwezelt Bridge near Maastricht, Belgium was reopened ceremoniously on 7 February 1945 by Communications Zone-ETO commanding general Lt. Gen. John C. H. Lee and his subordinate, Brig. Gen. Ewart Plank of the forward element of the Com-Z, ADSEC.

== Today ==
In 2002, the canal carried a record 43 million tons of goods of various kinds, amounting to more than half the Belgian waterway total.

The canal is also a popular leisure and cycling destination, with well paved service roads on both sides traversing picturesque farm land, particularly around Smeermaas, Lanaken and Maasmechelen.
