= 2024 in chess =

Gukesh Dommaraju won the 2024 World Chess Championship, becoming the youngest undisputed world chess champion at the age of 18.

The Candidates Tournament and Women's Candidates Tournament were held concurrently for the first time to determine the challengers for the reigning world champions Ding Liren and Ju Wenjun. The winners, Gukesh and Tan Zhongyi, advanced to the World Chess Championship 2024 and Women's World Chess Championship 2025 respectively.

Fabiano Caruana won the 2024 FIDE Circuit, encompassing major tournaments held in 2024, and qualified for the 2026 Candidates Tournament. The World Championship runner-up, Ding Liren, will no longer get an automatic Candidates spot in the 2024–2026 cycle. Instead, the World Championship match will be an eligible tournament for the 2025 FIDE Circuit.

== Timeline ==
January 2024 FIDE Rankings
| Rank | Prev | Player | Rating | Change |
|---|---|---|---|---|
| 1 | 1 | (Norway) Magnus Carlsen | 2830 | 0 |
| 2 | 2 | (United States) Fabiano Caruana | 2804 | +10 |
| 3 | 3 | (United States) Hikaru Nakamura | 2788 | 0 |
| 4 | 4 | (China) Ding Liren | 2780 | 0 |
| 5 | 5 | (FIDE) Ian Nepomniachtchi | 2769 | -2 |
| 6 | 6 | (France) Alireza Firouzja | 2759 | -4 |
| 7 | 8 | (United States) Wesley So | 2757 | +5 |
| 8 | 11 | (United States) Leinier Domínguez | 2752 | +7 |
| 9 | 9 | (FIDE) Sergey Karjakin | 2750 | 0 |
| 10 | 7 | (Netherlands) Anish Giri | 2749 | -5 |

=== January ===
- Jan 1 – Alireza Firouzja confirms his position above Wesley So in the January rating list and qualifies for the Candidates Tournament 2024. (Note: For more information, see Candidates Tournament 2024#FIDE Rating qualifier.)
- Jan 5 – Adani Group announces a long term sponsorship agreement with R Praggnanandhaa.
- Jan 9 – The President of India Droupadi Murmu confers the Arjuna Award on grandmaster-elect R Vaishali and the Dronacharya Award on grandmaster and coach RB Ramesh.
- Jan 21 – Leonid Ivanovic becomes the youngest player in history to beat a grandmaster in classical chess at the age of 8 years, 11 months, and 7 days.
- Jan 28 – Wei Yi wins the 2024 Tata Steel Masters after beating Gukesh Dommaraju in the tiebreak final. Leon Luke Mendonca wins the Challengers' section, qualifying to next year's Masters.
- Jan 30 – 13-year-old Andy Woodward earns his final grandmaster norm and becomes the youngest grandmaster in the world and the tenth youngest in history.

February 2024 FIDE Rankings
| Rank | Prev | Player | Rating | Change |
|---|---|---|---|---|
| 1 | 1 | (Norway) Magnus Carlsen | 2830 | 0 |
| 2 | 2 | (United States) Fabiano Caruana | 2804 | 0 |
| 3 | 3 | (United States) Hikaru Nakamura | 2788 | 0 |
| 4 | 4 | (China) Ding Liren | 2762 | -18 |
| 5 | 10 | (Netherlands) Anish Giri | 2762 | +13 |
| 6 | 6 | (France) Alireza Firouzja | 2760 | +1 |
| 7 | 5 | (FIDE) Ian Nepomniachtchi | 2758 | -11 |
| 8 | 7 | (United States) Wesley So | 2757 | 0 |
| 9 | 16 | (China) Wei Yi | 2755 | +15 |
| 10 | 8 | (United States) Leinier Domínguez | 2752 | 0 |

=== February ===
- Feb 1 – After the results of Tata Steel, Anish Giri climbs to world number five while Wei Yi debuts in the world's top ten.
- Feb 2 – FIDE President Arkady Dvorkovich posthumously awards the honorary grandmaster title to the late Sultan Khan.
- Feb 7 – Magnus Carlsen wins the Chessable Masters, the first leg of the Champions Chess Tour, after beating Alireza Firouzja in the Grand Final.
- Feb 16 – Magnus Carlsen beats Fabiano Caruana in the final to win the inaugural Freestyle Chess G.O.A.T. Challenge, the first major classical Fischer random chess tournament.
- Feb 18 – Ashwath Kaushik becomes the youngest player in history to beat a grandmaster in classical chess at the age of 8 years, 6 months, and 11 days.
- Feb 25 – Daniel Dardha and Hans Niemann tie for first at the Djerba Masters, with Dardha taking first on tiebreaks.

March 2024 FIDE Rankings
| Rank | Prev | Player | Rating | Change |
|---|---|---|---|---|
| 1 | 1 | (Norway) Magnus Carlsen | 2830 | 0 |
| 2 | 2 | (United States) Fabiano Caruana | 2804 | 0 |
| 3 | 3 | (United States) Hikaru Nakamura | 2789 | +1 |
| 4 | 4 | (China) Ding Liren | 2762 | 0 |
| 5 | 5 | (Netherlands) Anish Giri | 2762 | 0 |
| 6 | 6 | (France) Alireza Firouzja | 2760 | 0 |
| 7 | 7 | (FIDE) Ian Nepomniachtchi | 2758 | 0 |
| 8 | 8 | (United States) Wesley So | 2757 | 0 |
| 9 | 9 | (China) Wei Yi | 2755 | 0 |
| 10 | 12 | (India) Viswanathan Anand | 2751 | +3 |

=== March ===
- Mar 2 – FIDE makes an urgent appeal to the Canadian government, urging them to expedite the visa process for several players ahead of the Candidates Tournament.
  - Mar 7 – FIDE confirms that all visas have been approved in time and the event will go ahead in Toronto as planned.
- Mar 6-7 – Nodirbek Abdusattorov wins the Prague Masters with a round to spare. Ediz Gürel wins the Challengers' section and completes his third grandmaster norm.
- Mar 7 – Bu Xiangzhi wins the Shenzhen Masters on tiebreaks, ahead of Yu Yangyi and Arjun Erigaisi.
- Mar 18 – Bassem Amin wins the African Chess Championship. Jesse February wins the title in the women's section.
- Mar 20-21 – Levon Aronian defeats Wesley So in the grand final to win the American Cup. 14-year-old Alice Lee beats Irina Krush in blitz playoffs to win the women's section.

April 2024 FIDE Rankings
| Rank | Prev | Player | Rating | Change |
|---|---|---|---|---|
| 1 | 1 | (Norway) Magnus Carlsen | 2830 | 0 |
| 2 | 2 | (United States) Fabiano Caruana | 2803 | -1 |
| 3 | 3 | (United States) Hikaru Nakamura | 2789 | 0 |
| 4 | 11 | (Uzbekistan) Nodirbek Abdusattorov | 2765 | +15 |
| 5 | 4 | (China) Ding Liren | 2762 | 0 |
| 6 | 6 | (France) Alireza Firouzja | 2760 | 0 |
| 7 | 7 | (FIDE) Ian Nepomniachtchi | 2758 | 0 |
| 8 | 8 | (United States) Wesley So | 2757 | 0 |
| 9 | 14 | (India) Arjun Erigaisi | 2756 | +8 |
| 10 | 9 | (China) Wei Yi | 2755 | 0 |

=== April ===
- Apr 1 – Nodirbek Abdusattorov and Arjun Erigaisi debut in the world's top ten.
- Apr 1 – Magnus Carlsen wins his third Grenke Chess Classic after beating Richárd Rapport in the final. Hans Niemann wins the Open section.
- Apr 1 – Yağız Kaan Erdoğmuş becomes the youngest grandmaster in the world and the fourth youngest in history, at the age of 12 years, nine months, and 29 days.
- Apr 7 – Arjun Erigaisi wins the Menorca Open on tiebreaks .
- Apr 21 – Gukesh Dommaraju wins the Candidates Tournament 2024, advancing to the World Chess Championship 2024.
- Apr 21 – Tan Zhongyi wins the Women's Candidates Tournament 2024, advancing to the Women's World Chess Championship 2025.

=== June ===
- Jun 1 – Ethan Pang becomes the youngest player to surpass a FIDE rating of 2200.

=== July ===
- Jul 18 – Shama Yisrael becomes the first African-American woman to achieve the rank of National Master.

=== August ===
- Aug 6 – Jessica Hyatt becomes the second African-American woman to achieve the rank of National Master.

=== November ===
- Nov 1 – Ethan Pang becomes the youngest player to surpass a FIDE rating of 2300.
- Nov 1 – Anish Sarkar becomes the youngest FIDE-rated player, with a rating of 1556 at the age of 3 years, 8 months, and 19 days.

== Events ==
=== World Championship ===
The World Chess Championship was held in Singapore from 25 November to 12 December. It was played to a best of 14 games, with tiebreaks if required. The match was won by Gukesh 7½–6½ after 14 games.

World Chess Championship 2024
| | Rating | Match games | | | | | | | | | | | | | | Points |
| | Rating | 1 | 2 | 3 | 4 | 5 | 6 | 7 | 8 | 9 | 10 | 11 | 12 | 13 | 14 | Points |
|---|---|---|---|---|---|---|---|---|---|---|---|---|---|---|---|---|
| Gukesh Dommaraju (IND) | 2783 | 0 | ½ | 1 | ½ | ½ | ½ | ½ | ½ | ½ | ½ | 1 | 0 | ½ | 1 | 7½ |
| Ding Liren (CHN) | 2728 | 1 | ½ | 0 | ½ | ½ | ½ | ½ | ½ | ½ | ½ | 0 | 1 | ½ | 0 | 6½ |

=== Major tournaments ===
| Tournament | City | System | Dates | Players (2700+) | Winner | Runner-up | Third |
|---|---|---|---|---|---|---|---|
| Tata Steel Masters | (Netherlands) Wijk aan Zee | Round robin | 13 – 28 Jan | 14 (10) | (China) Wei Yi | (India) Gukesh Dommaraju | (Netherlands) Anish Giri (Uzbekistan) Nodirbek Abdusattorov |
| Prague Masters | (Czech Republic) Prague | Round robin | 27 Feb – 7 Mar | 10 (7) | (Uzbekistan) Nodirbek Abdusattorov | (Czech Republic) Thai Dai Van Nguyen | (Iran) Parham Maghsoodloo |
| Shenzhen Masters | (China) Shenzhen | Round robin | 29 Feb – 7 Mar | 8 (5) | (China) Bu Xiangzhi | (China) Yu Yangyi | (India) Arjun Erigaisi |
| Candidates Tournament | (Canada) Toronto | Double round robin | 3 – 22 Apr | 8 (7) | (India) Gukesh Dommaraju | (United States) Hikaru Nakamura | (FIDE) Ian Nepomniachtchi (Note: Russian players' flags are displayed as the FIDE flag, as Russian and Belarusian flags have been banned from FIDE-rated events in response to the Russian invasion of Ukraine.) |
| TePe Sigeman & Co tournament | (Sweden) Malmö | Round robin | 27 Apr – 3 May | 8 (3) | (Uzbekistan) Nodirbek Abdusattorov | (India) Arjun Erigaisi | (FIDE) Peter Svidler |
| Norway Chess | (Norway) Stavanger | Double round robin | 29 May – 7 Jun | 6 (6) | (Norway) Magnus Carlsen | (United States) Hikaru Nakamura | (India) R Praggnanandhaa |
| UzChess Cup Masters | (Uzbekistan) Tashkent | Round robin | 6 – 14 Jun | 10 (8) | (Uzbekistan) Nodirbek Yakubboev | (Uzbekistan) Nodirbek Abdusattorov | (China) Yu Yangyi |
| GCT Romania | (Romania) Bucharest | Round robin | 24 Jun – 6 Jul | 10 (9) | (United States) Fabiano Caruana | (France) Alireza Firouzja | (India) Gukesh Dommaraju |
| Biel Chess Festival | (Switzerland) Biel/Bienne | Multi-stage | 14 – 25 Jul | 6 (3) | (Vietnam) Le Quang Liem | (Armenia) Haik M. Martirosyan | (India) R Praggnanandhaa |
| Akiba Rubinstein Festival | (Poland) Polanica-Zdrój | Round robin | 17 – 25 Aug | 10 (3) | (Germany) Vincent Keymer | (Czech Republic) David Navara | (United States) Sam Shankland |
| Sinquefield Cup | (United States) St. Louis | Round robin | 19 – 28 Aug | 10 (10) | (France) Alireza Firouzja | (United States) Fabiano Caruana | (France) Maxime Vachier-Lagrave (Uzbekistan) Nodirbek Abdusattorov |
| Chess Olympiad | (Hungary) Budapest | Swiss | 10 – 23 Sep | Teams | India | United States | Uzbekistan |
| WR Chess Masters Cup | (United Kingdom) London | Single elimination | 14 – 17 Oct | 16 (9) | (India) Arjun Erigaisi | (France) Maxime Vachier-Lagrave | (India) R Praggnanandhaa (France) Alireza Firouzja |
| Chennai Grand Masters | (India) Chennai | Round robin | 5 – 11 Oct | 8 (6) | (India) Aravindh Chithambaram | (United States) Levon Aronian | (India) Arjun Erigaisi |

=== Opens ===
| Tournament | City | TAR | Dates | Players | Winner | Runner-up | Third |
|---|---|---|---|---|---|---|---|
| Aeroflot Open | (Russia) Moscow | 2679 7/8 | 2 – 8 Mar | 142 | (Iran) Amin Tabatabaei | (FIDE) Andrey Esipenko | (Uzbekistan) Nodirbek Yakubboev |
| Grenke Open | (Germany) Karlsruhe | 2689 1/4 | 26 Mar – 1 Apr | 935 | (United States) Hans Niemann | (Croatia) Ivan Šarić | (Slovenia) Vladimir Fedoseev |
| Menorca Open | (Spain) Menorca | 2676 5/8 | 2 – 7 Apr | 284 | (India) Arjun Erigaisi | (Austria) Kirill Alekseenko | (Spain) Maksim Chigaev |
| Dubai Police Global Chess Challenge | (United Arab Emirates) Dubai | 2694 3/8 | 3 – 13 May | 135 | (India) Pranav V | (India) Aravindh Chithambaram | (India) Pranesh M |
| Sharjah Masters | (United Arab Emirates) Sharjah | 2720 5/8 | 13 – 23 May | 88 | (Iran) Bardiya Daneshvar | (FIDE) Volodar Murzin | (United States) Sam Shankland |
| Vladimir Dvorkovich Memorial | (Kazakhstan) Aktobe | 2682 3/8 | 25 May – 2 Jun | 90 | (Iran) Parham Maghsoodloo | (Serbia) Alexandr Predke | (Serbia) Alexey Sarana |
| Abu Dhabi Masters | (United Arab Emirates) Abu Dhabi | 2677 1/4 | 15 – 24 Aug | 217 | (Uzbekistan) Nodirbek Yakubboev | (FIDE) David Paravyan | (Uzbekistan) Shamsiddin Vokhidov |
| European Championship | (Montenegro) Petrovac | 2678 3/8 | 7 – 20 Nov | 388 | (Serbia) Aleksandar Inđić | (Belgium) Daniel Dardha | (Germany) Frederik Svane |
| International President Cup | (Uzbekistan) Tashkent | 2691 3/4 | 21 – 29 Nov | 120 | (India) Nihal Sarin | (Uzbekistan) Javokhir Sindarov | (Iran) Parham Maghsoodloo |
| Saint Louis Masters | (United States) St. Louis | 2682 1/8 | 3 – 7 Dec | 59 | (United States) Fabiano Caruana (Germany) Alexander Donchenko | | (United States) Samuel Sevian |
| Qatar Masters Open | (Qatar) Doha | 2714 1/2 | 3 – 12 Dec | 138 | (FIDE) Andrey Esipenko | (India) Arjun Erigaisi | (Uzbekistan) Nodirbek Abdusattorov |

=== Women's events ===
| Tournament | City | System | Dates | Players (2500+) | Winner | Runner-up | Third |
|---|---|---|---|---|---|---|---|
| Candidates Tournament | (Canada) Toronto | Double round robin | 3 – 22 Apr | 8 (6) | (China) Tan Zhongyi | (India) Humpy Koneru | (China) Lei Tingjie |
| Norway Chess | (Norway) Stavanger | Double round robin | 29 May – 7 Jun | 6 (4) | (China) Ju Wenjun | (Ukraine) Anna Muzychuk | (China) Lei Tingjie |
| Cairns Cup | (United States) St. Louis | Round robin | 13 – 23 Jun | 10 (5) | (China) Tan Zhongyi | (Ukraine) Anna Muzychuk | (India) Harika Dronavalli (Ukraine) Mariya Muzychuk (Georgia (country)) Nana Dzagnidze (Switzerland) Alexandra Kosteniuk |
| Tbilisi FIDE Grand Prix | (Georgia (country)) Tbilisi | Round robin | 14 – 25 Aug | 10 (3) | (Poland) Alina Kashlinskaya | (Kazakhstan) Bibisara Assaubayeva | (Greece) Stavroula Tsolakidou |
| Chess Olympiad | (Hungary) Budapest | Swiss | 10 – 23 Sep | Teams | India | Kazakhstan | United States |
| Hoogeveen Crown group | (Netherlands) Hoogeveen | Double round robin | 28 Oct – 2 Nov | 4 (1) | (Netherlands) Eline Roebers | (Switzerland) Alexandra Kosteniuk | (Ukraine) Mariya Muzychuk |
| Shymkent FIDE Grand Prix | (Kazakhstan) Shymkent | Round robin | 30 Oct – 8 Nov | 10 (4) | (FIDE) Aleksandra Goryachkina | (China) Tan Zhongyi | (Kazakhstan) Bibisara Assaubayeva |

=== National events ===
| Tournament | City | System | Dates | Players | Winner | Runner-up | Third |
|---|---|---|---|---|---|---|---|
| Armenian Championship | (Armenia) Yerevan | Round robin | 12 – 20 Jan | 10 | Robert Hovhannisyan | Manuel Petrosyan | Zaven Andriasian |
| American Cup | (United States) St. Louis | Double elimination | 12 – 21 Mar | 8 | Levon Aronian | Wesley So | Ray Robson |
| Azerbaijani Championship | (Azerbaijan) Baku | Multi-stage | 11 – 26 Apr | 20 | Aydin Suleymanli | Mahammad Muradli | Vugar Rasulov |
| Chinese Championship | (China) Xinghua | Round robin | 6 – 16 May | 12 | Wang Yue | Zhao Chenxi | Xu Xiangyu |
| Polish Championship | (Poland) Rzeszów | Round robin | 22 – 30 May | 10 | Radosław Wojtaszek | Jacek Tomczak | Mateusz Bartel |
| Serbian Championship | (Serbia) Senta | Round robin | 17 – 25 Jun | 10 | Aleksandar Inđić | Robert Markuš | Alexey Sarana |
| Dutch Championship | (Netherlands) Utrecht | Single elimination | 6 – 13 Jul | 16 | Max Warmerdam | Sergei Tiviakov | Benjamin Bok; Ivan Sokolov |
| Belgian Championship | (Belgium) Lier | Round robin | 6 – 13 Jul | 10 | Daniel Dardha | Stefan Beukema | Mher Hovhannisyan |
| British Championship | (United Kingdom) Hull | Swiss | 27 Jul – 4 Aug | 86 | Gawain Jones | David Howell | Matthew Wadsworth |
| Indian Championship | (India) Gurgaon | Swiss | 17 – 27 Aug | 341 | Karthik Venkataraman | Surya Shekhar Ganguly | Neelash Saha |
| Russian Championship | (Russia) Barnaul | Round robin | 17 – 28 Aug | 12 | Vladislav Artemiev | Andrey Esipenko | Daniil Dubov |
| German Championship | (Germany) Ostfildern | Round robin | 19 – 27 Aug | 10 | Dmitrij Kollars | Niclas Huschenbeth | Dennis Wagner |
| French Championship | (France) Alpe d'Huez | Single elimination | 18 – 27 Aug | 16 | Jules Moussard | Laurent Fressinet | Romain Édouard |
| US Championship | (United States) St. Louis | Round robin | 11 – 23 Oct | 11 | Fabiano Caruana | Ray Robson | Awonder Liang |
| Spanish Championship | (Spain) Marbella | Swiss | 11 – 19 Dec | 104 | Daniil Yuffa | Maksim Chigaev | Eduardo Iturrizaga |

== Deaths ==
- 28 March — Igors Rausis
- 1 May — Juzefs Petkēvičs
- 8 June — Sergei Beshukov
- 5 July — Ziaur Rahman
- 31 July — Constantin Ionescu
- 31 July — Krum Georgiev
- 28 August — Andreas Dückstein
- 1 October — Zenón Franco Ocampos
- 9 November — Viesturs Meijers

== See also ==
- 2024 FIDE Circuit
- Grand Chess Tour 2024
- Champions Chess Tour 2024
- Freestyle Chess G.O.A.T. Challenge
- World Rapid Chess Championship 2024
- World Blitz Chess Championship 2024
- World Rapid and Blitz Team Chess Championships
- Global Chess League 2024
