= 't Asbroek =

Natural landscape in Schoten, Belgium

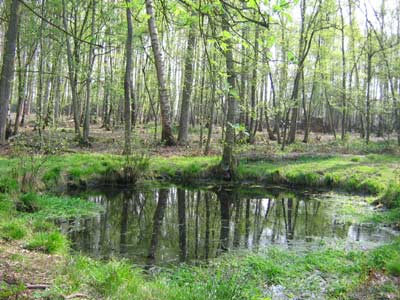

- Location within Belgium
- Interactive map of 't Asbroek

Geography
- Location: Schoten, Antwerp province, Belgium
- Coordinates: 51°15′N 4°29′E
- Area: 0.12 km^{2} (0.046 sq mi)

Administration
- Authority: Natuurpunt

't Asbroek is a nature domain and forest in the municipality of Schoten, Belgium, covering an area of 12 ha. The domain is owned by the municipality of Schoten and managed by nature conservation organisation Natuurpunt since 1998. It is officially recognised by the Flemish government as a nature reserve.

== History ==
Historically, 't Asbroek formed part of the adjacent Amerlo castle domain. The lower part of the domain was mostly wetland (broek in older Dutch) filled with ash (asch in older Dutch) trees, hence giving the forest its name. During the Second World War the domain was struck twice by V-bombs directed at the port of Antwerp. After 1945 a large portion of the domain was planted with dense rows of Aspen trees for future logging. After the handover to Natuurpunt, commercial logging was halted. However, because of trunk rot a large number of Aspen trees had to be cut down in 2019 in order to protect adjacent residential housing. In the long term, Natuurpunt hopes to restore the area back to its original state with only indigenous vegetation.

== Ecology ==
Along with Vordenstein park and the Peerdsbos forest, 't Asbroek forms part of a chain of forested domains at the northeastern border of the city of Antwerp, which houses a Roe deer population. The domain can be classified as a carr with iron-rich seeps that can cause the puddles and streams to color orange or red. The craters created by the V-bombs have become puddles which are inhabited by the palmate newt salamander. The forest also houses a diverse bird population, including the eurasian nuthatch, tawny owl and various woodpecker species.
