= Harrie Hendrickx =

Belgian politician

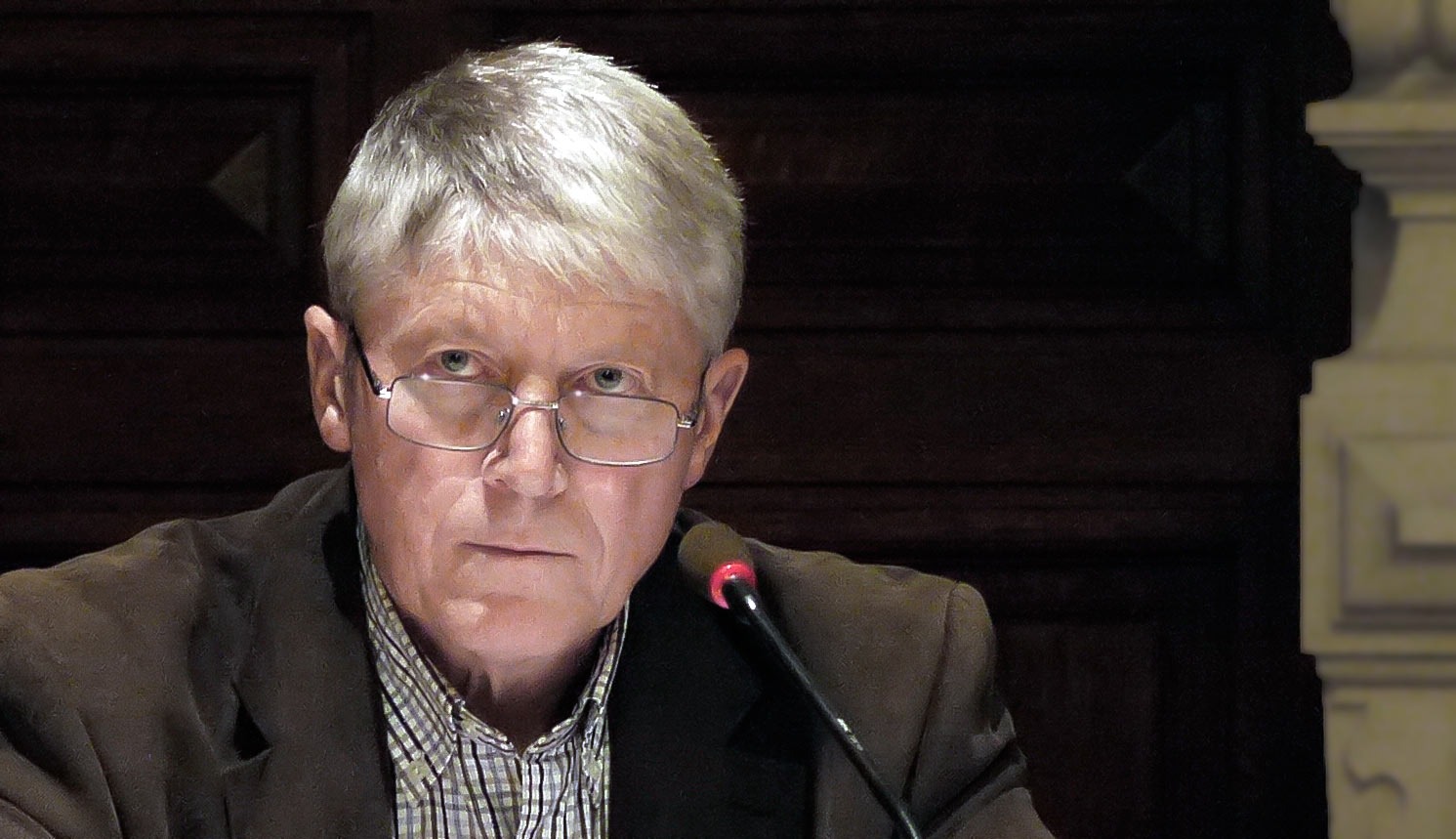
- Harrie Hendrickx in 2010

Mayor of Schoten
- In office 2003–2012

Acting Mayor of Schoten
- In office May 2003 – June 2003

Member of the Schoten Municipal Council
- In office 1971–2003

Personal details
- Party: CVP/CD&V
- Spouse: Lydia Denissen
- Education: Political and Social Sciences, Bookkeeping

Harrie Hendrickx is a former Belgian local politician in Schoten for the Christian democratic CVP/CD&V party.

== Biography ==
Hendrickx studied Political and Social sciences and subsequently Bookkeeping. After finishing his education, he entered the financial sector, and was employed at A.V., BAC, BACOB and finally Dexia. In 1983 he started as an independent insurance consultant.

In 1970 he became politically active during the local elections, and was elected to the municipal council. Hendrickx was able to hold on to this position until May 2003, when he was appointed as acting mayor, replacing then mayor Tony Sebrechts (also a member of the CD&V party). After the fulfilling of legal formalities in June, he was appointed as mayor.

In 2002, he was subject of a larger investigation into literary forgery and violations of the building regulations. Due to the running investigation, he could not be sworn in as mayor by provincial governor Camille Paulus, having won the municipal elections that year. The charges against him were eventually dropped by the prosecutor because no evidence of wrongdoing had been found, and Hendrickx was able to start his second term. Hendrickx also gained prominence in the national media during the runup to the same election, after declaring he was willing to break the cordon sanitaire and form a coalition with the far right Vlaams Belang, led by Marie-Rose Morel. Eventually, this turned out to be unnecessary, as the tripartite of CD&V/N-VA, VLD and SP.A was formed instead. In the local elections of 2012, Hendrickx and the CD&V were defeated by the N-VA candidate Maarten De Veuster, who is coincidentally also his son in law. He has since retired from politics.
