= Deuzeld =

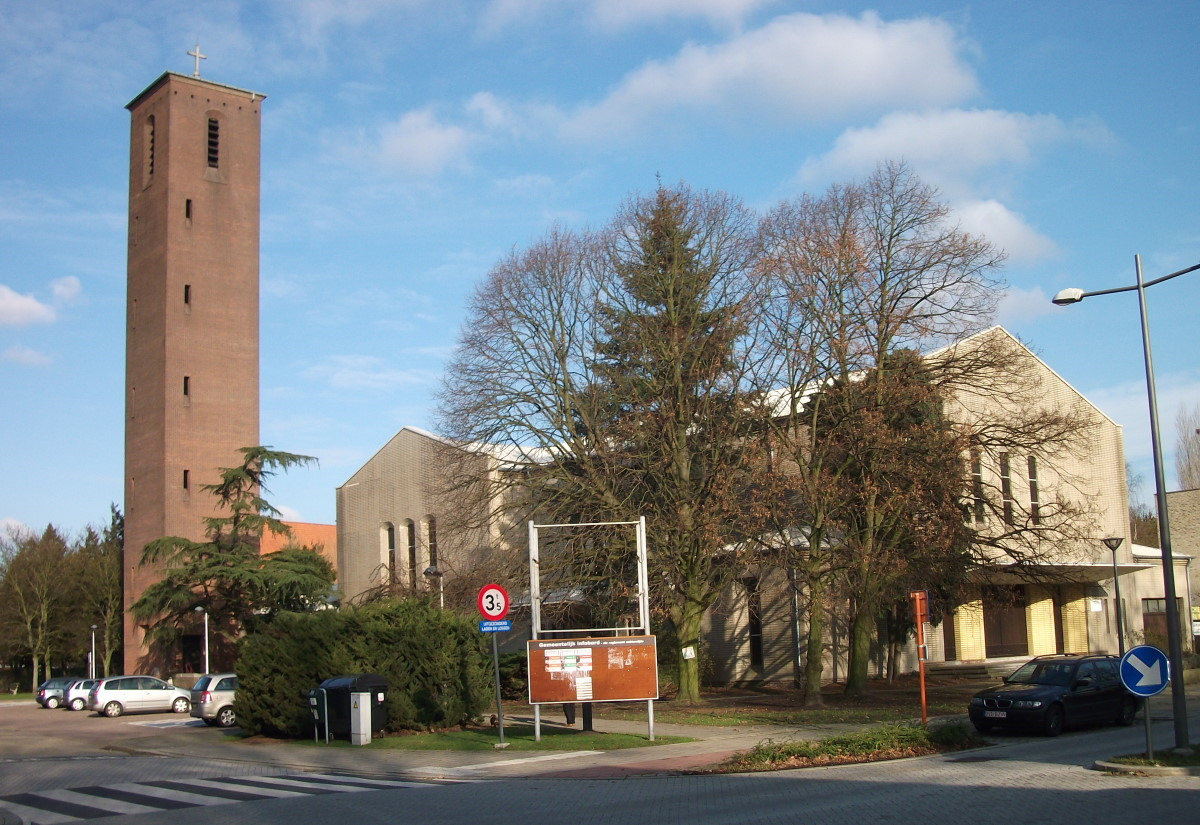
- The Heilig Hart (Sacred Heart) church at the Deuzeldlaan

- Location in Belgium
- Coordinates: 51°14′N 4°27′E
- Country: Belgium
- Region: Flemish Region
- Community: Flemish Community
- Province: Antwerp
- Arrondissement: Antwerp
- Municipality: Schoten

Area
  - Total: 2.47 km^{2} (0.95 sq mi)

Population (2021)
  - Total: 7,196
  - Density: 2,910/km^{2} (7,550/sq mi)
- Postal codes: 2900
- Area codes: 03

Deuzeld is a neighborhood in the Belgian municipality of Schoten. The neighborhood is located southwest of central Schoten, and lies near the border with the Antwerp district of Merksem. To the south of the Deuzeld neighborhood lies the Albert Canal, which connects Antwerp with Liège. The neighborhood is geographically separated from the rest of Schoten by several nature domains located along the path of the aborted A102 highway project.

== History ==
For a long time, the Deuzeld formed a small hamlet containing only a few homes, situated between Merksem and Schoten. It was shown on, for example, the Ferraris map, This is a map that was made by the Austrian general Joseph de Ferraris on the orders of emperor Joseph II.

Deuzeld began to develop during the industrial revolution. The construction of the Kempische Vaart (1847) and its replacement the Albert Canal (1946), made that the neighborhood quickly grew in numbers. In the late 19th century, a first church was built at the Kruiningenstraat. In 1961, work commenced on the new Heilig Hart church, which was opened the following year. Originally, a castle called the Cogelshof could be found at the Deuzeldlaan, which was eventually demolished because of its bad material condition.

In the 1970s, the castle was replaced by the Cogelspark and the Cogelshof service centre, built in glass and concrete. This was renovated in 2011 and is used by the OCMW. In 2008, the Deuzeldlaan, the main street of the neighborhood, was completely reconstructed, adding green elements and creating more room for cyclists. Plans exist to build a new bridge over the Albert Canal in the neighborhood, called the Kruiningenbrug, which would only be used by pedestrians and cyclists.
