= Stefan Beukema =

Belgian chess player (born 1996)

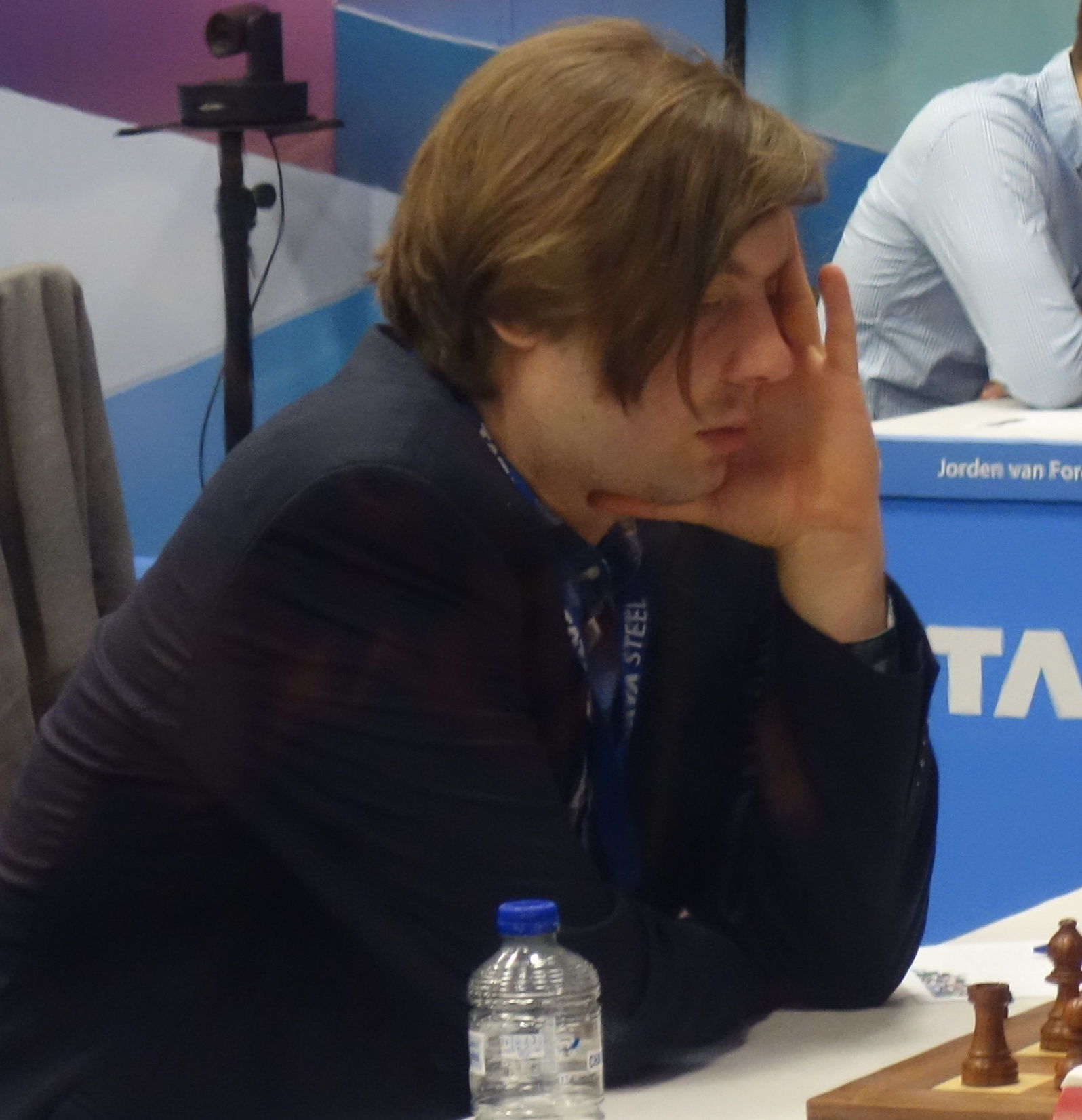
- Beukema in 2024

Personal information
- Born: February 17, 1996 (age 30) Schoten, Belgium

Chess career
- Country: Netherlands (until 2012); Belgium (since 2012)
- Title: International Master (2016)
- Peak rating: 2443 (November 2024)

Stefan Beukema is a Belgian chess player.

== Chess career ==
In 2016, Beukema played in the World Junior Chess Championship.

Beukema played in Group A of the 2018 Groningen Chess Festival, where he was the second seed.

Beukema won the Amateur section of the Tata Steel Chess Tournament 2023, which qualified him to compete in the Challengers section in the following year.

Beukema competed in the Tata Steel Chess Tournament 2024 Challengers, where he held grandmasters Daniel Dardha and Liam Vrolijk to draws.
