= Tata Steel Chess Tournament 2024 =

Chess tournament

	Masters Champion	Challengers Champion
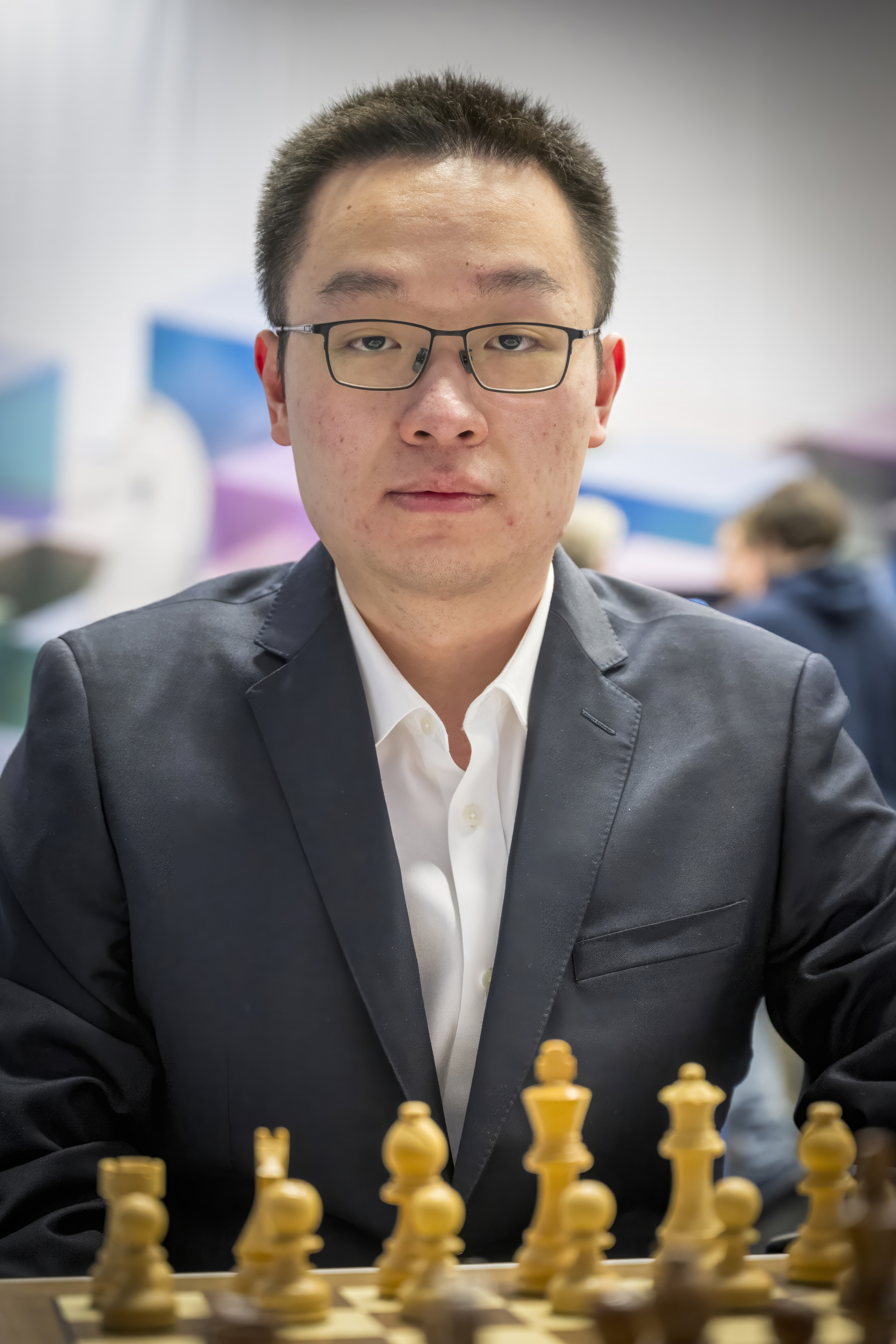
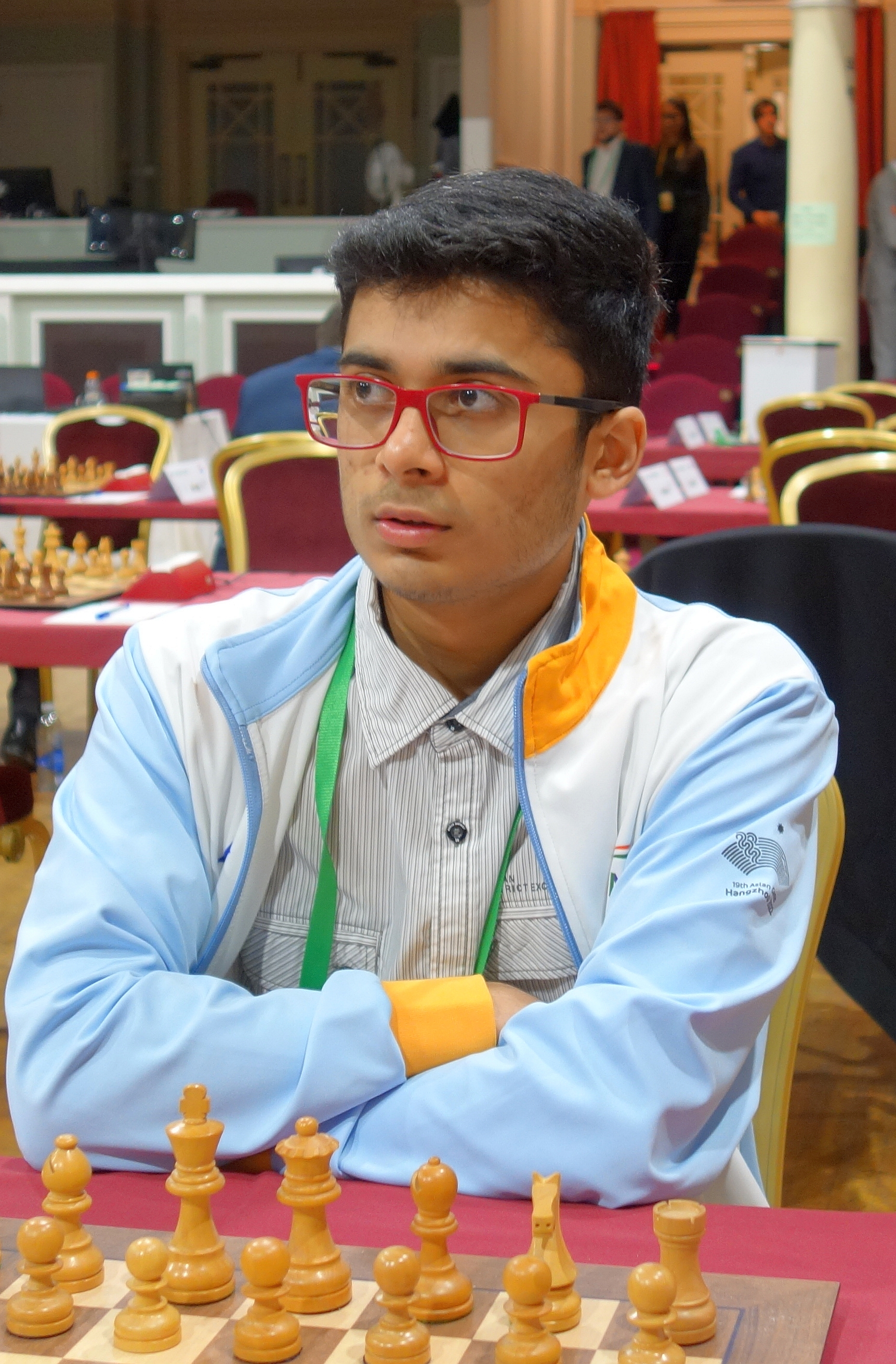
	(China) Wei Yi	(India) Leon Luke Mendonca
8½/13	Scores	9½/13
	Born 2 June 1999; 24 years old	Born 13 March 2006; 17 years old

The Tata Steel Chess Tournament 2024 was the 86th edition of the annual chess tournament held in Wijk aan Zee from 13–28 January 2024. The competition followed a similar format to the previous year's edition, taking place at the Dorpshuis De Moriaan in Wijk aan Zee, Netherlands, while round 9 of the Masters section was played at the AFAS Circustheater in The Hague, Netherlands as part of the competition's "Chess on Tour" event.

The Masters section was won by China's Wei Yi, who defeated India's Gukesh Dommaraju by a score of 1.5–0.5 in the finals of a four-player knockout tournament tiebreak. India's Leon Luke Mendonca won the Challengers' section, earning a spot in the 2025 Tata Steel Masters event. Both the Masters and Challengers sections were eligible for the 2024 FIDE Circuit.

The event witnessed a four-way tie for first place for the first time since 1989, between the defending champion Anish Giri, Nodirbek Abdusattorov, Gukesh Dommaraju and eventual champion Wei Yi.

== Organization ==
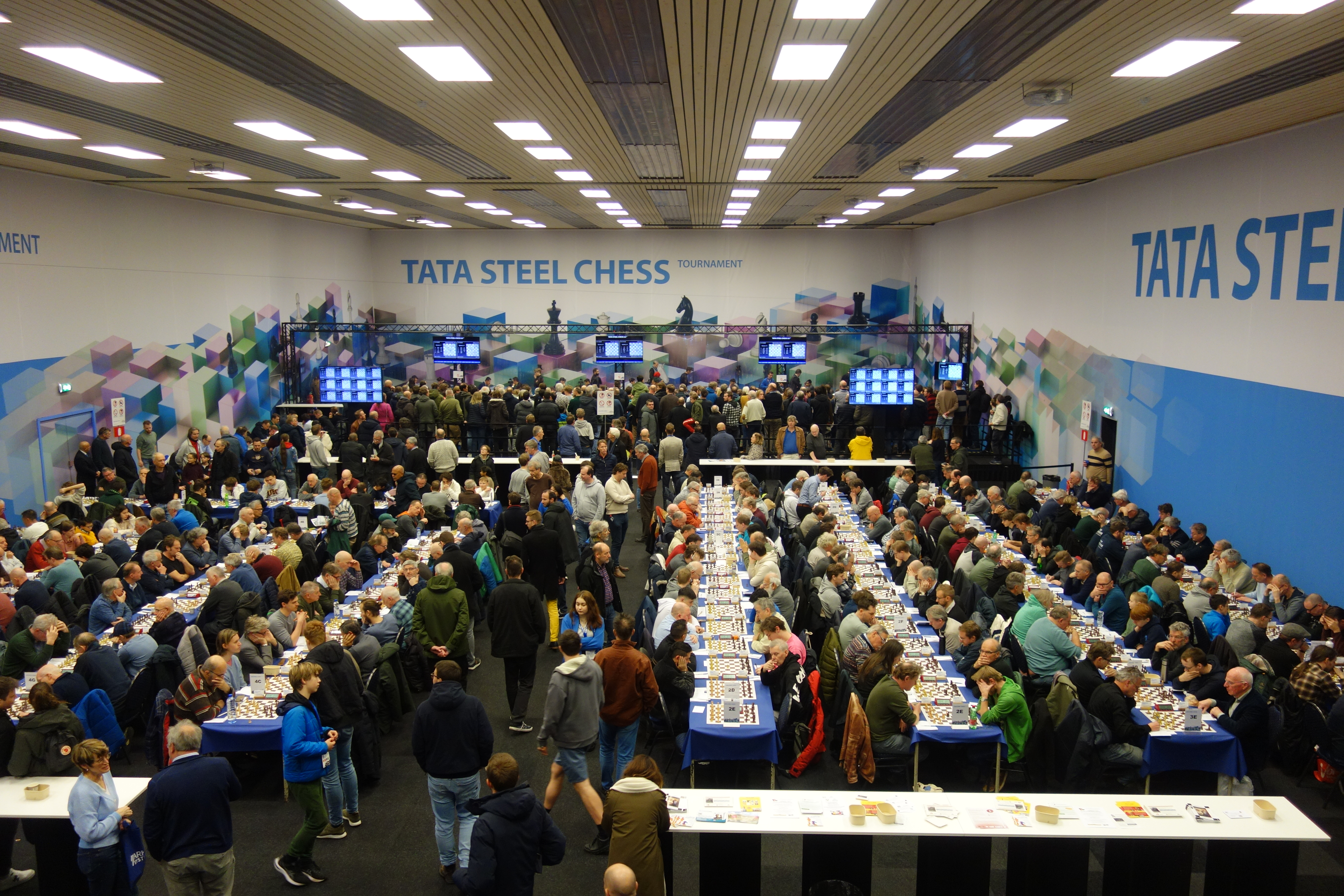
Tata Steel Chess 2024

The tournament was a fourteen-player, single round-robin tournament, meaning there are 13 rounds with each player facing the others once.

The field of 14 players in the Masters section included the defending champion Anish Giri, and both the defending World Chess Champion and Women's World Chess Champion, Ding Liren and Ju Wenjun, with Ding playing his first international event since May 2023 after taking a hiatus from professional chess due to illness. Notably, world number one and former World Chess Champion Magnus Carlsen did not play at the event for the first time since 2014; Tournament Director Jeroen van den Berg said that Carlsen's absence was due to "scheduling conflicts".

=== Regulations ===
The time control was 100 minutes for the first 40 moves, followed by 50 minutes for all remaining moves, plus a 30 second increment per move from move 1. Players got 1 point for a win, ½ point for a draw and 0 points for a loss.

Tiebreaks for the first place were addressed as follows:

- Players would play two blitz chess games at 3 minutes plus 2 seconds per move. If a three or five-way tie had occurred, a single round-robin would be played. As four players were tied, a single elimination tournament was played.
- Two players still tied for first after the blitz chess games would play a "sudden death" game with white receiving 2½ minutes while black receives 3 minutes plus both players would gain 2 seconds per move. A drawing of lots determined which player had white. If the game had been drawn, the players would have switched colors and played again with that colour for the next two games, and then repeated this process until a decisive result was obtained.

== Standings ==
=== Masters ===
86th Tata Steel Masters, 12–28 January 2024, Wijk aan Zee, Netherlands, Category XIX (2712)
	Player	Rating	1	2	3	4	5	6	7	8	9	10	11	12	13	14	Total	TB	SB	H2H	TPR
1	Wei Yi (China)	2740		0	½	½	0	1	½	1	½	1	1	½	1	1	8½	3			2820
2	Gukesh Dommaraju (India)	2725	1		0	½	½	½	½	1	0	½	1	1	1	1	8½	2½			2821
3	Anish Giri (Netherlands)	2749	½	1		0	½	½	½	½	½	1	1	1	½	1	8½	1			2819
4	Nodirbek Abdusattorov (Uzbekistan)	2727	½	½	1		½	0	½	0	½	1	1	1	1	1	8½	½			2821
5	Alireza Firouzja (France)	2759	1	½	½	½		0	½	1	1	0	0	1	1	½	7½		48.50		2765
6	Vidit Gujrathi (India)	2742	0	½	½	1	1		½	½	½	½	½	½	1	½	7½		47.75		2767
7	R Praggnanandhaa (India)	2743	½	½	½	½	½	½		½	1	1	½	½	½	½	7½		47.00		2767
8	Ian Nepomniachtchi (FIDE)	2769	0	0	½	1	0	½	½		1	½	½	½	½	1	6½				2708
9	Ding Liren (China)	2780	½	1	½	½	0	½	0	0		½	½	½	½	1	6				2678
10	Ju Wenjun (China)	2549	0	½	0	0	1	½	0	½	½		½	0	½	½	4½		28.25		2614
11	Alexander Donchenko (Germany)	2643	0	0	0	0	1	½	½	½	½	½		½	½	0	4½		28.00		2607
12	Jorden van Foreest (Netherlands)	2682	½	0	0	0	0	½	½	½	½	1	½		½	0	4½		27.00		2604
13	Parham Maghsoodloo (Iran)	2740	0	0	½	0	0	0	½	½	½	½	½	½		1	4½		25.00		2600
14	Max Warmerdam (Netherlands)	2625	0	0	0	0	½	½	½	0	0	½	1	1	0		4				2578

==== Tiebreaks ====
Semifinals
1	(Uzbekistan) Nodirbek Abdusattorov	½
4	(China) Wei Yi	1½
2	(India) Gukesh Dommaraju	2
3	(Netherlands) Anish Giri	1

Finals
4	(China) Wei Yi	1½
2	(India) Gukesh Dommaraju	½

=== Challengers ===
2024 Tata Steel Challengers, 12–28 January 2024, Wijk aan Zee, Netherlands, Category XIII (2569)
	Player	Rating	1	2	3	4	5	6	7	8	9	10	11	12	13	14	Total	SB	Black	TPR
1	GM Leon Luke Mendonca (India)	2611		½	½	0	1	1	½	1	0	1	1	1	1	1	9½			2741
2	GM Daniel Dardha (Belgium)	2602	½		1	½	½	1	½	½	1	½	1	½	½	1	9	55.50		2708
3	GM Marc'Andria Maurizzi (France)	2572	½	0		½	0	1	1	1	1	½	½	1	1	1	9	50.25		2710
4	GM Erwin l'Ami (Netherlands)	2627	1	½	½		½	½	½	0	½	1	½	1	1	1	8½	49.75		2675
5	GM Anton Korobov (Ukraine)	2663	0	½	1	½		0	1	½	½	½	1	1	1	1	8½	47.75		2672
6	GM Salem Saleh (UAE)	2630	0	0	0	½	1		½	½	1	1	0	1	1	1	7½			2622
7	GM Hans Niemann (United States)	2692	½	½	0	½	0	½		½	1	1	½	1	1	0	7	41.25		2589
8	GM Jaime Santos Latasa (Spain)	2615	0	½	0	1	½	½	½		½	½	1	0	1	1	7	39.50		2595
9	GM Liam Vrolijk (Netherlands)	2566	1	0	0	½	½	0	0	½		½	1	0	½	1	5½	32.50		2512
10	GM Harika Dronavalli (India)	2500	0	½	½	0	½	0	0	½	½		½	½	1	1	5½	28.75		2518
11	GM Mustafa Yılmaz (Turkey)	2665	0	0	½	½	0	1	½	0	0	½		1	1	0	5			2475
12	IM Divya Deshmukh (India)	2420	0	½	0	0	0	0	0	1	1	½	0		½	1	4½			2471
13	IM Stefan Beukema (Belgium)	2427	0	½	0	0	0	0	0	0	½	0	0	½		1	2½			2330
14	IM Eline Roebers (Netherlands)	2381	0	0	0	0	0	0	1	0	0	0	1	0	0		2			2288

== Results by round ==
The pairings for both the Masters and Challengers section were announced before the start of the tournament. First named player is white. 1–0 indicates a white win, 0–1 indicates a black win, and ½–½ indicates a draw. Numbers in parentheses show players' scores prior to the round. Final column indicates opening played, sourced from The Week in Chess.

Rounds 1–13 for both sections began at 14:00 local time (CET), which is 13:00 UTC. The final round began at 12:00 CET, which is 11:00 UTC.

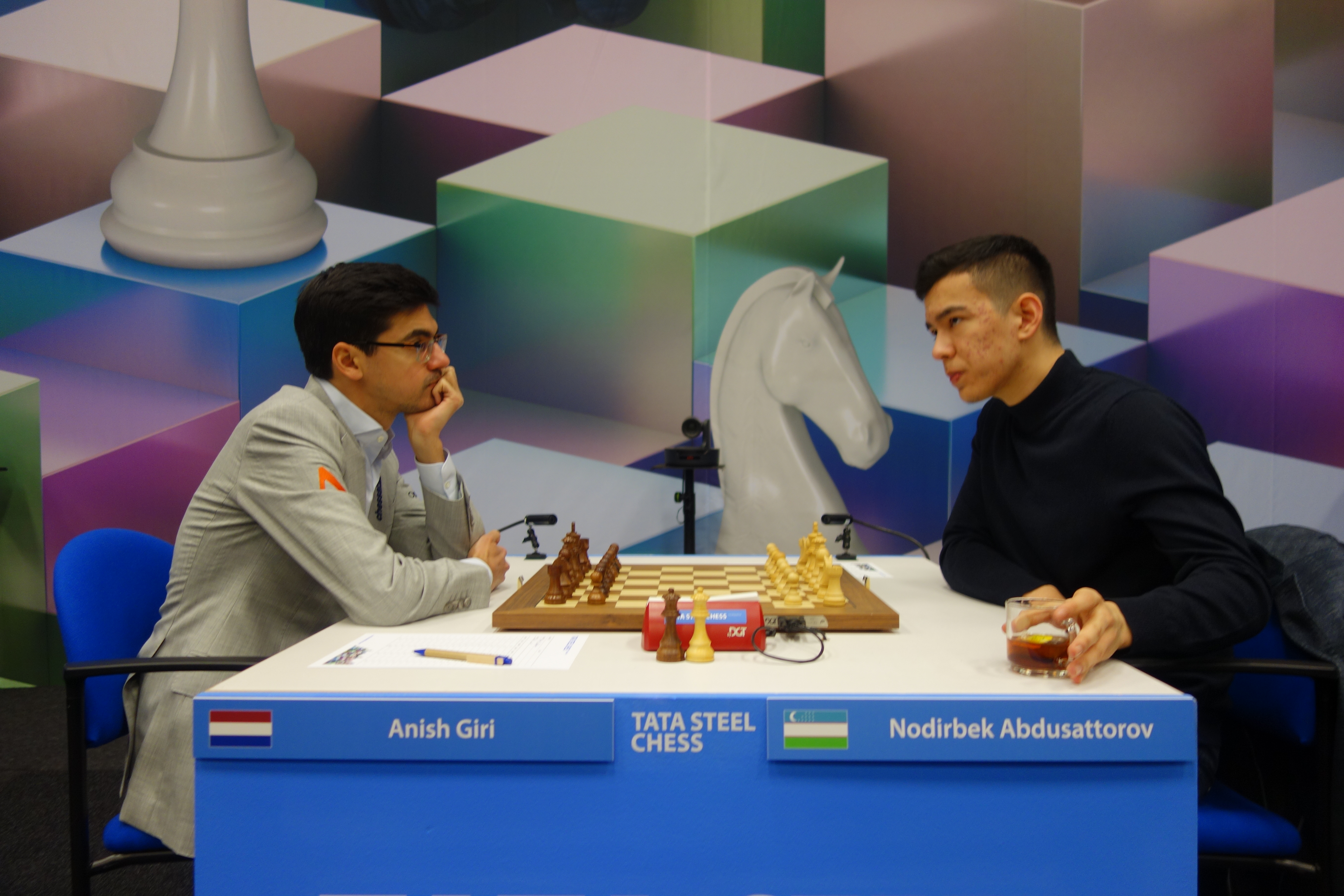
Giri vs. Abdusattorov (Round 7)

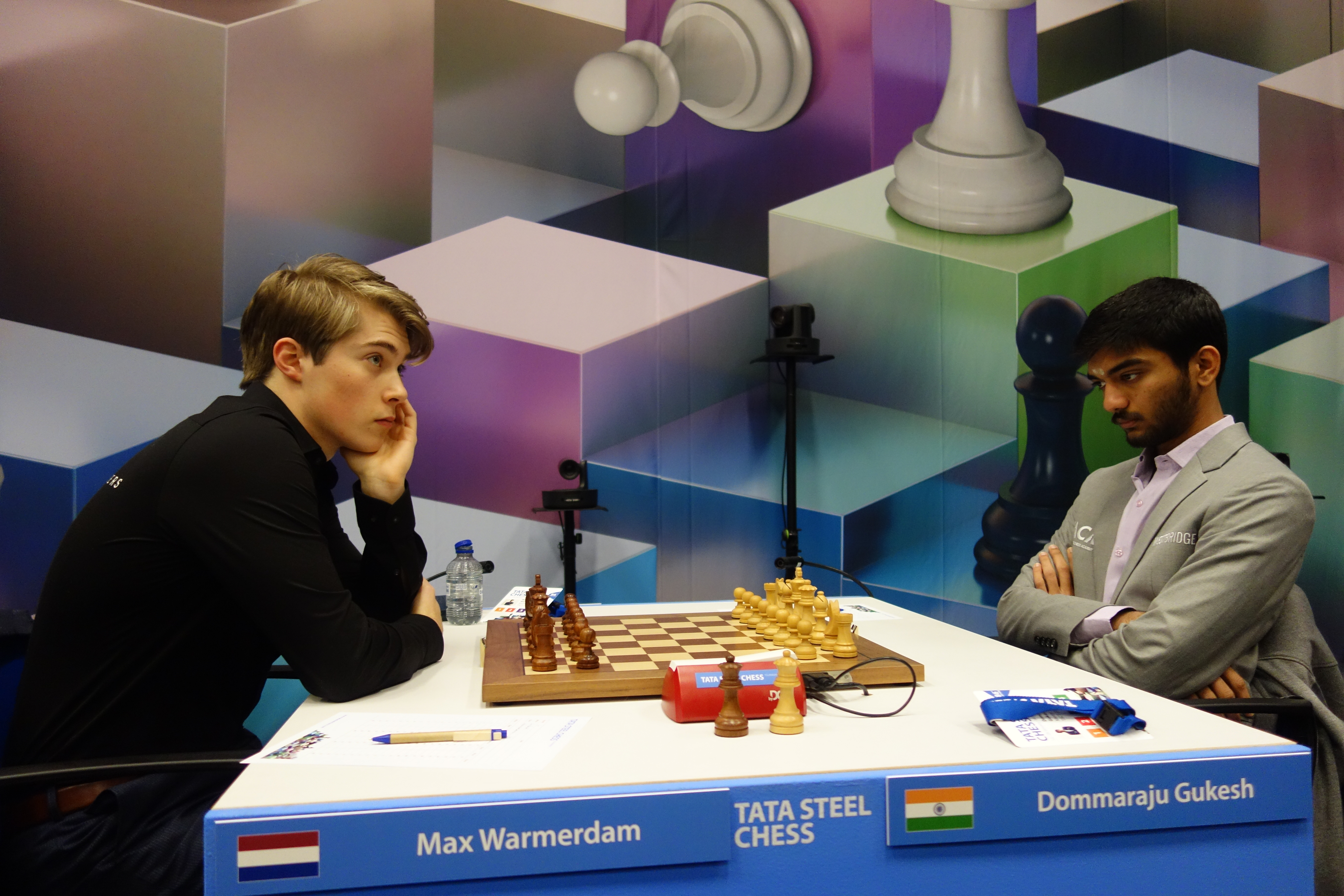
Warmerdam vs. Gukesh (Round 7)

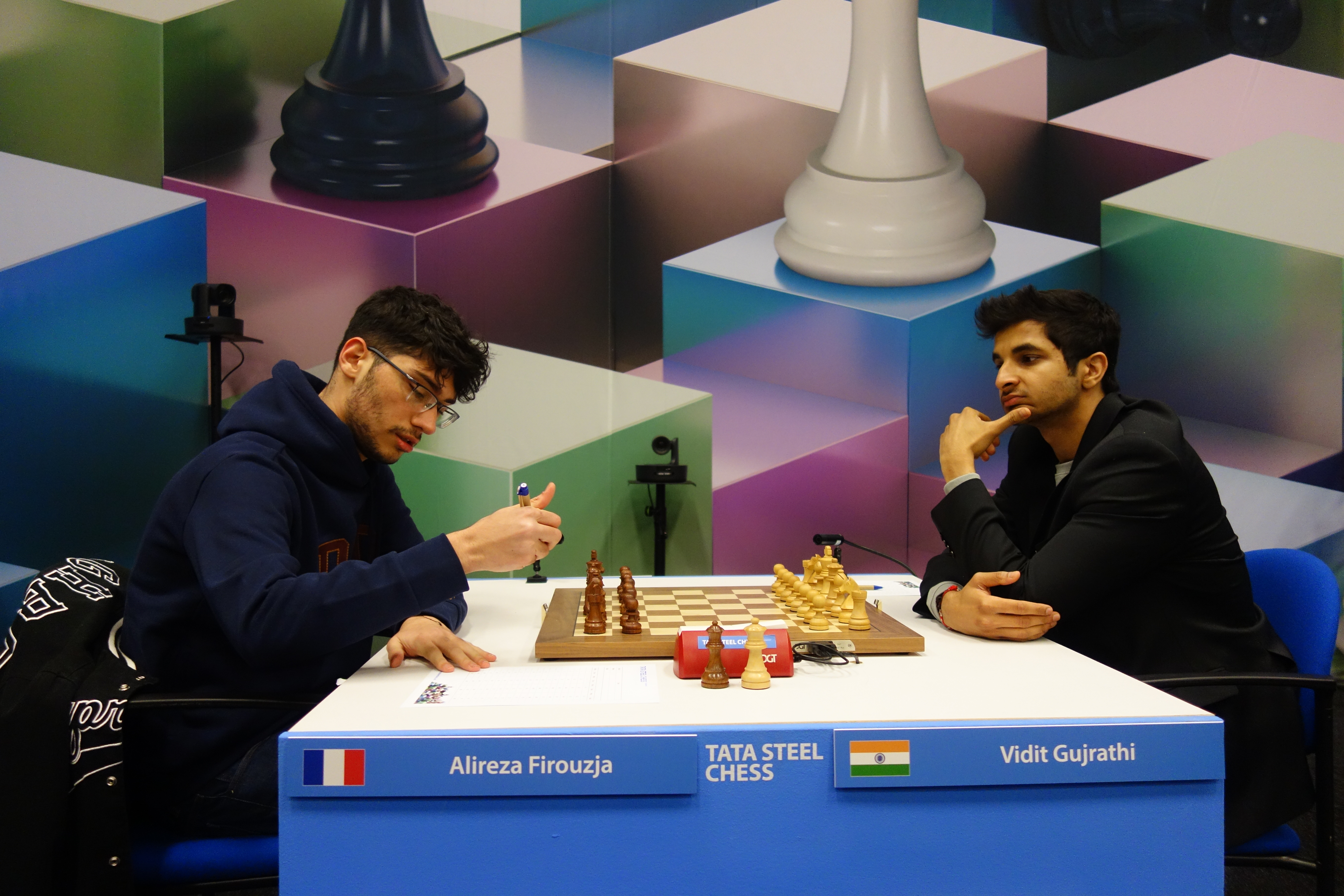
Firouzja vs. Gujrathi (Round 7)

=== Masters ===
Round 1 – 13 January 2024
Jorden van Foreest	0–1	Alireza Firouzja	C11 French Defence
Max Warmerdam	0–1	Ian Nepomniachtchi	D37 QGD: 5.Bf4
Ju Wenjun	0–1	Anish Giri	B40 Sicilian Classical
Vidit Gujrathi	½–½	Ding Liren	E47 Nimzo-Indian
Alexander Donchenko	0–1	Wei Yi	E60 King's Indian Defence
Gukesh Dommaraju	½–½	Nodirbek Abdusattorov	C55 Two Knights Defense
R Praggnanandhaa	½–½	Parham Maghsoodloo	B95 Sicilian Najdorf: 6.Bg5
Round 2 – 14 January 2024
Alireza Firouzja (1)	1–0	Parham Maghsoodloo (½)	C67 Ruy Lopez Berlin
Nodirbek Abdusattorov (½)	½–½	R Praggnanandhaa (½)	E06 Catalan
Wei Yi (1)	0–1	Gukesh Dommaraju (½)	C53 Giuoco Piano
Ding Liren (½)	½–½	Alexander Donchenko (0)	E94 King's Indian Classical
Anish Giri (1)	½–½	Vidit Gujrathi (½)	D10 Slav Defense
Ian Nepomniachtchi (1)	½–½	Ju Wenjun (0)	E06 Catalan
Jorden van Foreest (0)	0–1	Max Warmerdam (0)	D02 London System
Round 3 – 15 January 2024
Max Warmerdam (1)	½–½	Alireza Firouzja (2)	E15 Queen's Indian
Ju Wenjun (½)	0–1	Jorden van Foreest (0)	B06 Modern Defense
Vidit Gujrathi (1)	½–½	Ian Nepomniachtchi (1½)	C42 Petrov's Defence
Alexander Donchenko (½)	0–1	Anish Giri (1½)	A41 Modern Defense
Gukesh Dommaraju (1½)	0–1	Ding Liren (1)	C50 Giuoco Piano
R Praggnanandhaa (1)	½–½	Wei Yi (1)	B95 Sicilian Najdorf: 6.Bg5
Parham Maghsoodloo (½)	0–1	Nodirbek Abdusattorov (1)	A22 English Opening
Round 4 – 16 January 2024
Alireza Firouzja (2½)	½–½	Nodirbek Abdusattorov (2)	C82 Ruy Lopez Open Italian
Wei Yi (1½)	1–0	Parham Maghsoodloo (½)	B12 Caro–Kann Advanced
Ding Liren (2)	0–1	R Praggnanandhaa (1½)	C77 Ruy Lopez Anderssen
Anish Giri (2½)	1–0	Gukesh Dommaraju (1½)	A28 English Four Knights
Ian Nepomniachtchi (2)	½–½	Alexander Donchenko (½)	B90 Sicilian Najdorf
Jorden van Foreest (1)	½–½	Vidit Gujrathi (1½)	C48 Four Knights Rubenstein
Max Warmerdam (1½)	½–½	Ju Wenjun (½)	E06 Catalan
Round 5 – 18 January 2024
Ju Wenjun (1)	1–0	Alireza Firouzja (3)	C01 French Exchange
Vidit Gujrathi (2)	½–½	Max Warmerdam (2)	C85 Ruy Lopez Steenwijker
Alexander Donchenko (1)	½–½	Jorden van Foreest (1½)	A20 English Opening
Gukesh Dommaraju (1½)	1–0	Ian Nepomniachtchi (2½)	D41 Semi-Tarrasch
R Praggnanandhaa (2½)	½–½	Anish Giri (3½)	D00 Queen's Pawn Game
Parham Maghsoodloo (½)	½–½	Ding Liren (2)	C50 Giuoco Piano
Nodirbek Abdusattorov (2½)	½–½	Wei Yi (2½)	D87 Grünfeld Botvinnik
Round 6 – 19 January 2024
Alireza Firouzja (3)	1–0	Wei Yi (3)	D40 Semi-Tarrasch
Ding Liren (2½)	½–½	Nodirbek Abdusattorov (3)	D27 QGA
Anish Giri (4)	½–½	Parham Maghsoodloo (1)	A07 Barcza System
Ian Nepomniachtchi (2½)	½–½	R Praggnanandhaa (3)	A05 Réti Opening
Jorden van Foreest (2)	0–1	Gukesh Dommaraju (2½)	C45 Scotch Game
Max Warmerdam (2½)	1–0	Alexander Donchenko (1½)	E94 King's Indian Classical
Ju Wenjun (2)	½–½	Vidit Gujrathi (2½)	E15 Queen's Indian
Round 7 – 20 January 2024
Vidit Gujrathi (3)	1–0	Alireza Firouzja (4)	B90 Sicilian Najdorf
Alexander Donchenko (1½)	½–½	Ju Wenjun (2½)	D36 QGD Exchange
Gukesh Dommaraju (3½)	1–0	Max Warmerdam (3½)	D32 Tarrasch Defense
R Praggnanandhaa (3½)	½–½	Jorden van Foreest (2)	D43 Anti-Meran Gambit
Parham Maghsoodloo (1½)	½–½	Ian Nepomniachtchi (3)	C42 Petrov's Defence
Nodirbek Abdusattorov (3½)	1–0	Anish Giri (4½)	C42 Petrov's Defence
Wei Yi (3)	½–½	Ding Liren (3)	C47 Four Knights

Round 8 – 21 January 2024
Alireza Firouzja (4)	1–0	Ding Liren (3½)	D40 Semi-Tarrasch
Anish Giri (4½)	½–½	Wei Yi (3½)	E60 King's Indian Defence
Ian Nepomniachtchi (3½)	1–0	Nodirbek Abdusattorov (4½)	C55 Two Knights Defense
Jorden van Foreest (2½)	½–½	Parham Maghsoodloo (2)	B51 Sicilian Rossolimo
Max Warmerdam (3½)	½–½	R Praggnanandhaa (4)	E11 Bogo-Indian Defence
Ju Wenjun (3)	½–½	Gukesh Dommaraju (4½)	E11 Bogo-Indian Defence
Vidit Gujrathi (4)	½–½	Alexander Donchenko (2)	D38 QGD Ragozin
Round 9 – 23 January 2024
Alexander Donchenko (2½)	1–0	Alireza Firouzja (5)	D35 QGD Exchange
Gukesh Dommaraju (5)	½–½	Vidit Gujrathi (4½)	C42 Petrov's Defence
R Praggnanandhaa (4½)	1–0	Ju Wenjun (3½)	C58 Two Knights Defense
Parham Maghsoodloo (2½)	1–0	Max Warmerdam (4)	D32 Tarrasch Defense
Nodirbek Abdusattorov (4½)	1–0	Jorden van Foreest (3)	C55 Two Knights Defense
Wei Yi (4)	1–0	Ian Nepomniachtchi (4½)	C24 Bishop's Opening
Ding Liren (3½)	½–½	Anish Giri (5)	D31 Semi-Slav Defense
Round 10 – 24 January 2024
Alireza Firouzja (5)	½–½	Anish Giri (5½)	D37 QGD: 5.Bf4
Ian Nepomniachtchi (4½)	1–0	Ding Liren (4)	C84 Ruy Lopez Centre Attack
Jorden van Foreest (3)	½–½	Wei Yi (5)	A45 Trompowsky Attack
Max Warmerdam (4)	0–1	Nodirbek Abdusattorov (5½)	D25 QGA
Ju Wenjun (3½)	½–½	Parham Maghsoodloo (3½)	D37 QGD: 5.Bf4
Vidit Gujrathi (5)	½–½	R Praggnanandhaa (5½)	E11 Bogo-Indian Defence
Alexander Donchenko (3½)	0–1	Gukesh Dommaraju (5½)	E48 Nimzo-Indian
Round 11 – 26 January 2024
Gukesh Dommaraju (6½)	½–½	Alireza Firouzja (5½)	D85 Grünfeld Defence
R Praggnanandhaa (6)	½–½	Alexander Donchenko (3½)	D16 Slav Smyslov
Parham Maghsoodloo (4)	0–1	Vidit Gujrathi (5½)	D37 QGD: 5.Bf4
Nodirbek Abdusattorov (6½)	1–0	Ju Wenjun (4)	C55 Two Knights Defense
Wei Yi (5½)	1–0	Max Warmerdam (4)	C24 Bishop's Opening
Ding Liren (4)	½–½	Jorden van Foreest (3½)	A28 English Four Knights
Anish Giri (6)	½–½	Ian Nepomniachtchi (5½)	D41 Semi-Tarrasch
Round 12 – 27 January 2024
Alireza Firouzja (6)	1–0	Ian Nepomniachtchi (6)	D01 Rapport-Jobava System: 3.Bf4
Jorden van Foreest (4)	0–1	Anish Giri (6½)	C01 French Exchange
Max Warmerdam (4)	0–1	Ding Liren (4½)	E15 Queen's Indian
Ju Wenjun (4)	0–1	Wei Yi (6½)	A90 Dutch Classical
Vidit Gujrathi (6½)	1–0	Nodirbek Abdusattorov (7½)	E51 Nimzo-Indian
Alexander Donchenko (4)	½–½	Parham Maghsoodloo (4)	D37 QGD: 5.Bf4
Gukesh Dommaraju (7)	½–½	R Praggnanandhaa (6½)	E21 Nimzo-Indian 4.Nf3
Round 13 – 28 January 2024
R Praggnanandhaa (7)	½–½	Alireza Firouzja (7)	D87 Grünfeld Botvinnik
Parham Maghsoodloo (4½)	0–1	Gukesh Dommaraju (7½)	D38 QGD Ragozin
Nodirbek Abdusattorov (7½)	1–0	Alexander Donchenko (4½)	B90 Sicilian Najdorf
Wei Yi (7½)	1–0	Vidit Gujrathi (7½)	D05 Colle System
Ding Liren (5½)	½–½	Ju Wenjun (4)	C55 Two Knights Defense
Anish Giri (7½)	1–0	Max Warmerdam (4)	A06 Zukertort Opening
Ian Nepomniachtchi (6)	½–½	Jorden van Foreest (4)	C55 Two Knights Defense

==== Points by round ====
This table shows the total number of wins minus the total number of losses each player has after each round. '=' indicates the player has won and lost the same number of games after that round. Green backgrounds indicate the player(s) with the highest score after each round. Red backgrounds indicate player(s) who could no longer win the tournament after each round. (Note: Players are marked in red if there is no permutation of remaining results that allows them to catch up the tournament leader(s) after remaining rounds.)

Rank	Player	Rounds												
Rank	Player	1	2	3	4	5	6	7	8	9	10	11	12	13
1	Wei Yi (CHN)	+1	=	=	+1	+1	=	=	=	+1	+1	+2	+3	+4
2	Gukesh Dommaraju (IND)	=	+1	=	–1	=	+1	+2	+2	+2	+3	+3	+3	+4
3	Anish Giri (NED)	+1	+1	+2	+3	+3	+3	+2	+2	+2	+2	+2	+3	+4
4	Nodirbek Abdusattorov (UZB)	=	=	+1	+1	+1	+1	+2	+1	+2	+3	+4	+3	+4
5	Alireza Firouzja (FRA)	+1	+2	+2	+2	+1	+2	+1	+2	+1	+1	+1	+2	+2
6	Vidit Gujrathi (IND)	=	=	=	=	=	=	+1	+1	+1	+1	+2	+3	+2
7	R Praggnanandhaa (IND)	=	=	=	+1	+1	+1	+1	+1	+2	+2	+2	+2	+2
8	Ian Nepomniachtchi (FIDE)	+1	+1	+1	+1	=	=	=	+1	=	+1	+1	=	=
9	Ding Liren (CHN)	=	=	+1	=	=	=	=	–1	–1	–2	–2	–1	–1
10	Ju Wenjun (CHN)	–1	–1	–2	–2	–1	–1	–1	–1	–2	–2	–3	–4	–4
11	Alexander Donchenko (GER)	–1	–1	–2	–2	–2	–3	–3	–3	–2	–3	–3	–3	–4
12	Jorden van Foreest (NED)	–1	–2	–1	–1	–1	–2	–2	–2	–3	–3	–3	–4	–4
13	Parham Maghsoodloo (IRI)	=	–1	–2	–3	–3	–3	–3	–3	–2	–2	–3	–3	–4
14	Max Warmerdam (NED)	–1	=	=	=	=	+1	=	=	–1	–2	–3	–4	–5

=== Challengers ===
Round 1 – 13 January 2024
Hans Niemann	1–0	Liam Vrolijk	C50 Giuoco Piano
Mustafa Yılmaz	0–1	Jaime Santos Latasa	D38 QGD Ragozin
Salem Saleh	1–0	Anton Korobov	B94 Sicilian Najdorf: 6.Bg5
Divya Deshmukh	½–½	Stefan Beukema	D10 Slav Defense
Eline Roebers	0–1	Leon Luke Mendoca	B94 Sicilian Najdorf: 6.Bg5
Marc'Andria Maurizzi	½–½	Harika Dronavalli	E06 Catalan
Daniel Dardha	½–½	Erwin l'Ami	B13 Caro–Kann Exchange
Round 2 – 14 January 2024
Liam Vrolijk (0)	½–½	Erwin l'Ami (½)	D30 Queen's Gambit
Harika Dronavalli (½)	½–½	Daniel Dardha (½)	B95 Sicilian Sozin Attack
Leon Luke Mendoca (1)	½–½	Marc'Andria Maurizzi (½)	C65 Ruy Lopez Berlin
Stefan Beukema (½)	1–0	Eline Roebers (0)	A45 Trompowsky Attack
Anton Korobov (0)	1–0	Divya Deshmukh (½)	C26 Vienna Game
Jaime Santos Latasa (1)	½–½	Salem Saleh (1)	D37 QGD Exchange
Hans Niemann (1)	½–½	Mustafa Yılmaz (0)	A45 Trompowsky Attack
Round 3 – 15 January 2024
Mustafa Yılmaz (½)	0–1	Liam Vrolijk (½)	D37 QGD: 5.Bf4
Salem Saleh (1½)	½–½	Hans Niemann (1½)	C67 Ruy Lopez Berlin
Divya Deshmukh (½)	1–0	Jaime Santos Latasa (1½)	E49 Nimzo-Indian
Eline Roebers (0)	0–1	Anton Korobov (1)	B85 Scheveningen Classical
Marc'Andria Maurizzi (1)	1–0	Stefan Beukema (1½)	D46 Anti-Meran Variation
Daniel Dardha (1)	½–½	Leon Luke Mendoca (1½)	D43 Anti-Meran Gambit
Erwin l'Ami (1)	1–0	Harika Dronavalli (1)	C01 French Exchange
Round 4 – 16 January 2024
Liam Vrolijk (1½)	½–½	Harika Dronavalli (1)	A15 English Anglo-Indian
Leon Luke Mendoca (2)	0–1	Erwin l'Ami (2)	D36 QGD Exchange
Stefan Beukema (1½)	½–½	Daniel Dardha (1½)	A14 Réti Opening
Anton Korobov (2)	1–0	Marc'Andria Maurizzi (2)	D43 Anti-Meran Gambit
Jaime Santos Latasa (1½)	1–0	Eline Roebers (0)	E84 King's Indian Saemisch
Hans Niemann (2)	1–0	Divya Deshmukh (1½)	C50 Giuoco Piano
Mustafa Yılmaz (½)	1–0	Salem Saleh (2)	A34 English Symmetrical
Round 5 – 18 January 2024
Salem Saleh (2)	1–0	Liam Vrolijk (2)	E47 Nimzo-Indian
Divya Deshmukh (1½)	0–1	Mustafa Yılmaz (1½)	E01 Catalan
Eline Roebers (0)	1–0	Hans Niemann (3)	B12 Caro–Kann Advanced
Marc'Andria Maurizzi (2)	1–0	Jaime Santos Latasa (2½)	E10 Blumenfeld Gambit
Daniel Dardha (2)	½–½	Anton Korobov (3)	C11 French Defence
Erwin l'Ami (3)	1–0	Stefan Beukema (2)	D10 Slav Defence
Harika Dronavalli (1½)	0–1	Leon Luke Mendoca (2)	A10 English Opening
Round 6 – 19 January 2024
Liam Vrolijk (2)	1–0	Leon Luke Mendoca (3)	A05 Réti Opening
Stefan Beukema (2)	0–1	Harika Dronavalli (1½)	A03 Bird's Opening
Anton Korobov (3½)	½–½	Erwin l'Ami (4)	C42 Petrov's Defence
Jaime Santos Latasa (2½)	½–½	Daniel Dardha (2½)	C67 Ruy Lopez Berlin
Hans Niemann (3)	0–1	Marc'Andria Maurizzi (3)	C55 Two Knights Defense
Mustafa Yılmaz (2½)	0–1	Eline Roebers (1)	E94 King's Indian Classical
Salem Saleh (3)	1–0	Divya Deshmukh (1½)	A07 Barcza System
Round 7 – 20 January 2024
Divya Deshmukh (1½)	1–0	Liam Vrolijk (3)	A22 English Opening
Eline Roebers (2)	0–1	Salem Saleh (4)	C72 Ruy Lopez Modern Steinitz
Marc'Andria Maurizzi (4)	½–½	Mustafa Yılmaz (2½)	E04 Catalan
Daniel Dardha (3)	½–½	Hans Niemann (3)	B22 Sicilian Alapin
Erwin l'Ami (4½)	0–1	Jaime Santos Latasa (3)	A13 Réti Opening
Harika Dronavalli (2½)	½–½	Anton Korobov (4)	D22 QGA
Leon Luke Mendoca (3)	1–0	Stefan Beukema (2)	D45 Anti-Meran Variation

Round 8 – 21 January 2024
Liam Vrolijk (3)	½–½	Stefan Beukema (2)	A07 Barcza System
Anton Korobov (4½)	0–1	Leon Luke Mendoca (4)	C07 French Tarrasch
Jaime Santos Latasa (4)	½–½	Harika Dronavalli (3)	C60 Ruy Lopez
Hans Niemann (3½)	½–½	Erwin l'Ami (4½)	D36 QGD Exchange
Mustafa Yılmaz (3)	0–1	Daniel Dardha (3½)	D27 QGA
Salem Saleh (5)	0–1	Marc'Andria Maurizzi (4½)	D43 Anti-Meran Gambit
Divya Deshmukh (2½)	1–0	Eline Roebers (2)	C15 French Winawer
Round 9 – 23 January 2024
Eline Roebers (2)	0–1	Liam Vrolijk (3½)	C37 Muzio Gambit
Marc'Andria Maurizzi (5½)	1–0	Divya Deshmukh (3½)	D79 Grünfeld 3.g3
Daniel Dardha (4½)	1–0	Salem Saleh (5)	A15 English Opening
Erwin l'Ami (5)	½–½	Mustafa Yılmaz (3)	D38 QGD Ragozin
Harika Dronavalli (3½)	0–1	Hans Niemann (4)	E00 Catalan
Leon Luke Mendoca (5)	1–0	Jaime Santos Latasa (4½)	C50 Giuoco Piano
Stefan Beukema (2½)	0–1	Anton Korobov (4½)	A20 English Opening
Round 10 – 24 January 2024
Liam Vrolijk (4½)	½–½	Anton Korobov (5½)	E00 Catalan
Jaime Santos Latasa (4½)	1–0	Stefan Beukema (2½)	A07 Barcza System
Hans Niemann (5)	½–½	Leon Luke Mendoca (6)	A11 Réti Opening
Mustafa Yılmaz (3½)	½–½	Harika Dronavalli (3½)	D37 QGD: 5.Bf4
Salem Saleh (5)	½–½	Erwin l'Ami (5½)	C65 Ruy Lopez Berlin
Divya Deshmukh (3½)	½–½	Daniel Dardha (5½)	C74 Ruy Lopez Modern Steinitz
Eline Roebers (2)	0–1	Marc'Andria Maurizzi (6½)	C02 French Advance
Round 11 – 26 January 2024
Marc'Andria Maurizzi (7½)	1–0	Liam Vrolijk (5)	C88 Ruy Lopez Closed
Daniel Dardha (6)	1–0	Eline Roebers (2)	E63 King's Indian 6...Nc6
Erwin l'Ami (6)	1–0	Divya Deshmukh (4)	C67 Ruy Lopez Berlin
Harika Dronavalli (4)	0–1	Salem Saleh (5½)	D45 Anti-Meran Variation
Leon Luke Mendoca (6½)	1–0	Mustafa Yılmaz (4)	C50 Giuoco Piano
Stefan Beukema (2½)	0–1	Hans Niemann (5½)	A20 English Opening
Anton Korobov (6)	½–½	Jaime Santos Latasa (5½)	D38 QGD Ragozin
Round 12 – 27 January 2024
Liam Vrolijk (5)	½–½	Jaime Santos Latasa (6)	A07 Barcza System
Hans Niemann (6½)	0–1	Anton Korobov (6½)	A11 Réti Opening
Mustafa Yılmaz (4)	1–0	Stefan Beukema (2½)	D11 Slav Defense
Salem Saleh (6½)	0–1	Leon Luke Mendoca (7½)	C11 French Defence
Divya Deshmukh (4)	½–½	Harika Dronavalli (4)	D35 QGD Exchange
Eline Roebers (2)	0–1	Erwin l'Ami (7)	C67 Ruy Lopez Berlin
Marc'Andria Maurizzi (8½)	0–1	Daniel Dardha (7)	B90 Sicilian Najdorf
Round 13 – 28 January 2024
Daniel Dardha (8)	1–0	Liam Vrolijk (5½)	A45 Trompowsky Attack
Erwin l'Ami (8)	½–½	Marc'Andria Maurizzi (8½)	B40 Sicilian Classical
Harika Dronavalli (4½)	1–0	Eline Roebers (2)	E69 King's Indian Fianchetto
Leon Luke Mendoca (8½)	1–0	Divya Deshmukh (4½)	B45 Sicilian Classical
Stefan Beukema (2½)	0–1	Salem Saleh (6½)	A36 English Botvinnik
Anton Korobov (7½)	1–0	Mustafa Yılmaz (5)	D38 QGD Ragozin
Jaime Santos Latasa (6½)	½–½	Hans Niemann (6½)	E32 Nimzo-Indian 4.Qc2
