= Maarten De Veuster =

Flemish politician

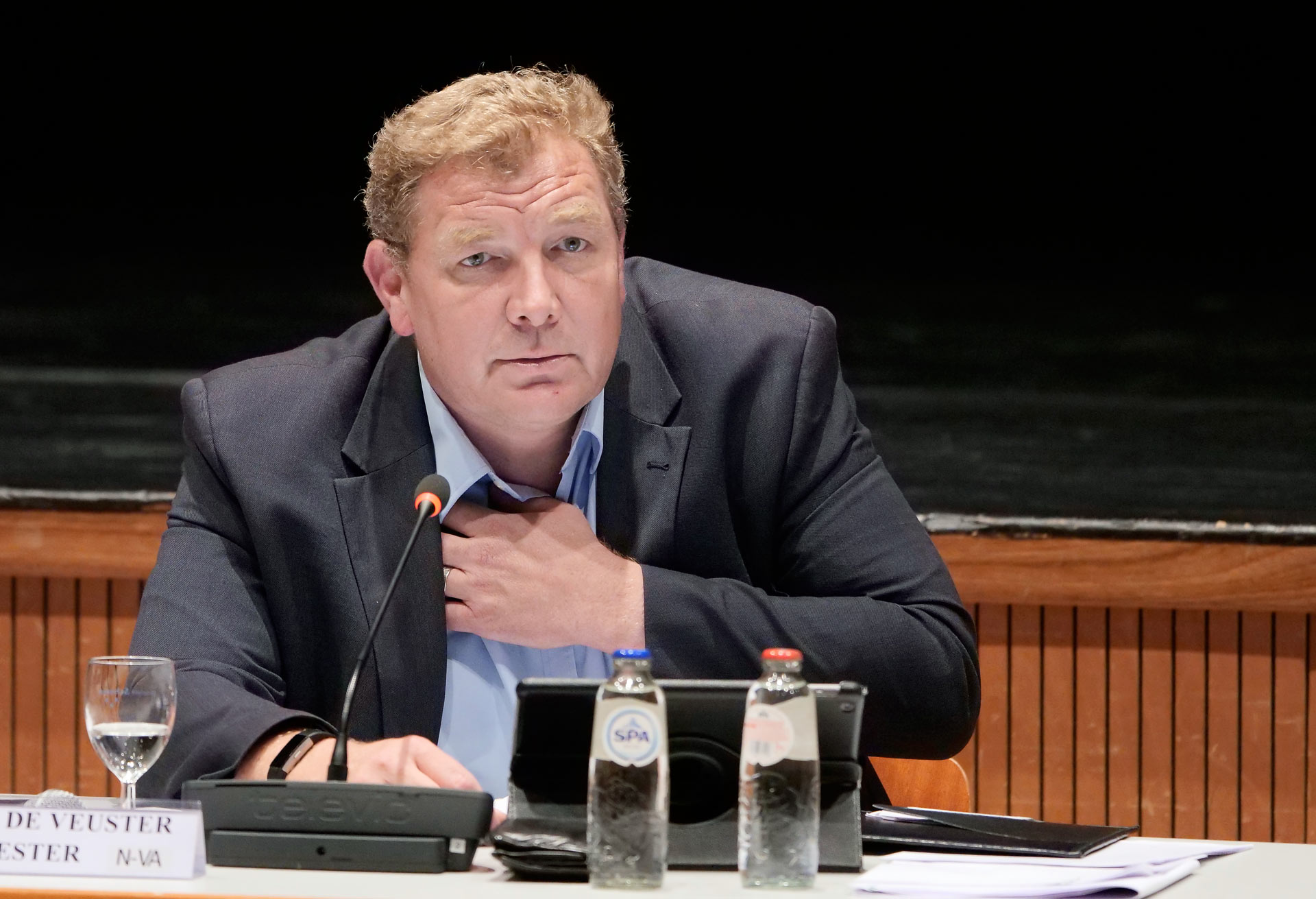

Maarten De Veuster (born 22 February 1973) is a Belgian politician and a member of the New Flemish Alliance.

De Veuster studied a business degree at the Karel de Grote University of Applied Sciences and Arts in Antwerp where he was an active member of the Flemish nationalist and conservative Katholiek Vlaams Hoogstudentenverbond (KVHV) student group. Since 2016, he has been a municipal councilor in Schoten for the N-VA. In 2019, he was elected as a member of the Flemish Parliament.
