= Gedeon Barcza =

Hungarian chess grandmaster (1911–1986)

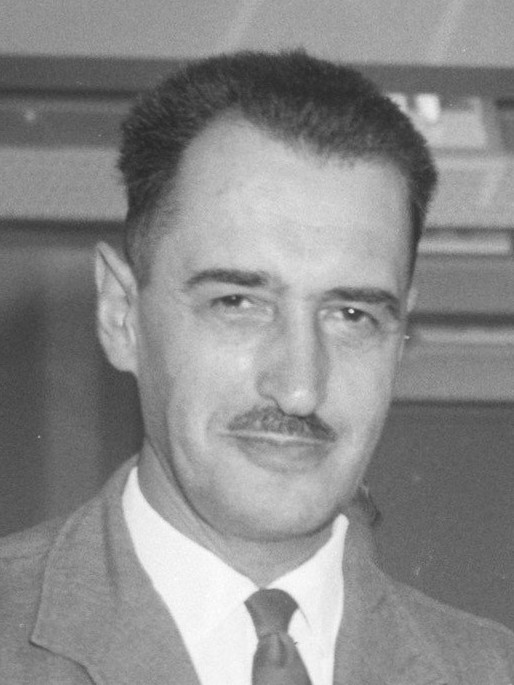
- Barcza in 1964

Personal information
- Born: August 21, 1911 Kisújszállás, Austria-Hungary
- Died: February 27, 1986 (aged 74) Budapest, Hungary

Chess career
- Country: Hungary
- Title: Grandmaster (1954); International Correspondence Chess Master (1966)
- Peak rating: 2490 (July 1971)
- Peak ranking: No. 83 (July 1971)

Gedeon Barcza (August 21, 1911 – February 27, 1986) was a Hungarian chess grandmaster. He won the Hungarian Chess Championship eight times and represented his country in seven Olympiads. The Barcza System is named after him.

== Chess career ==
In 1940, Barcza took third place, behind Max Euwe and Milan Vidmar, at Maróczy Jubiläum in Budapest. In September 1942, he took sixth place at the first European Championship in Munich; the event was won by Alexander Alekhine. In 1948, he took second place in Karlovy Vary; the event was won by Jan Foltys. In 1948, he tied for second/third place in Venice; the event was won by Miguel Najdorf. In 1950, he tied for second/fourth place in Szczawno Zdrój; the event was won by Paul Keres. In 1952, he took fifteenth place in Saltsjöbaden (interzonal). In 1957, he won in San Benedetto del Tronto. In 1961, he took third place in Vienna. In 1962, he tied for third/sixth place in Moscow. In 1962, he tied for fourteenth/fifteenth place in Stockholm (interzonal).

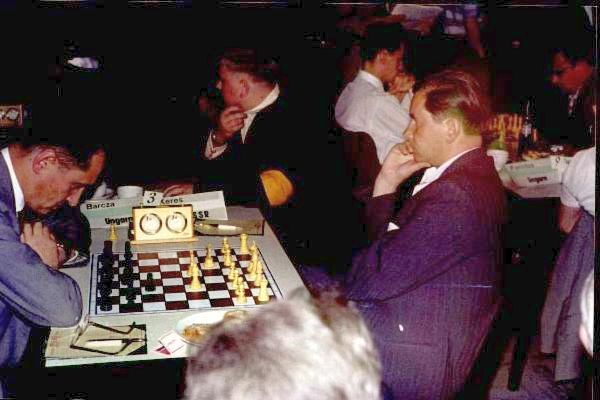
Barcza (left) vs. Paul Keres, 1961

Barcza won the Hungarian Chess Championship eight times (1942, 1943, 1947, 1950, 1951, 1955, 1957, and 1966). He played for the Hungarian team in seven Chess Olympiads (1952, 1954, 1956,1958, 1960, 1962, and 1968). Barcza was awarded the Grandmaster title in 1954.

== Legacy ==
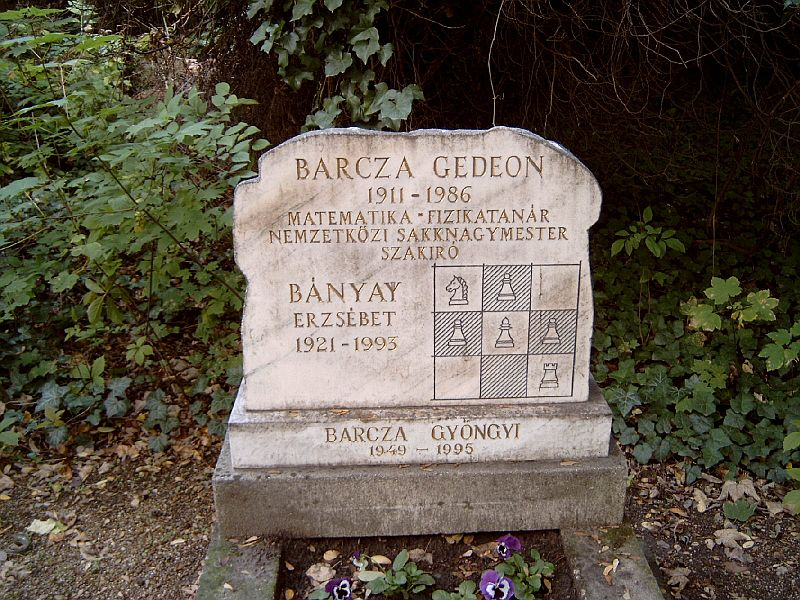
Barcza's gravestone

Barcza is remembered for the opening 1.Nf3 d5 2.g3, known as the Barcza System. Harry Golombek once said of Barcza, "He is a most versatile player in the openings. He plays g2–g3 sometimes on the first, sometimes on the second, sometimes on the third, and sometimes not until the fourth move."

== Notable games ==
- Gedeon Barcza vs. Harry Golombek, Sweden izt (18) 1952, Queen's Indian Defense: Spassky System (E14), 1–0.
- Gedeon Barcza vs. Lodewijk Prins, Sweden izt (14) 1952, Zukertort Opening: Queen Pawn Defense (A06), ½–½.
- Gedeon Barcza vs. Robert James Fischer, Zurich 1959, Formation: King's Indian Attack (A07), ½–½.

== See also ==
- King's Indian Attack
