= Peerdsbos =

Natural landscape in Belgium

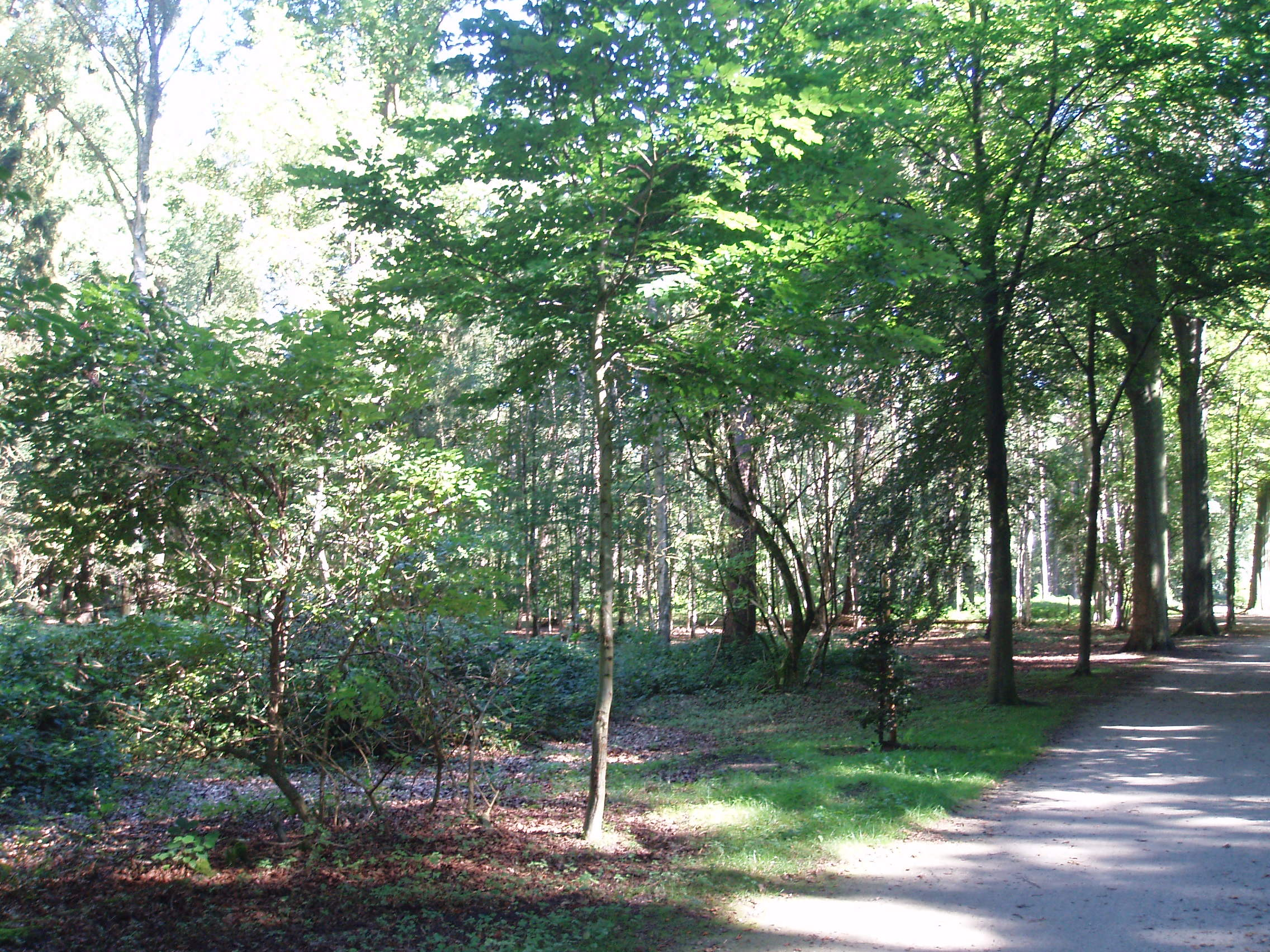

- Location within Belgium
- Interactive map of Peerdsbos

Geography
- Location: Schoten, Brasschaat; Antwerp province, Belgium
- Coordinates: 51°16′N 4°29′E
- Area: 1.48 km^{2} (0.57 sq mi)

Administration
- Authority: Agency for Nature and Forests

The Peerdsbos is a forest and nature domain situated in the Belgian municipalities of Brasschaat and Schoten, to the north of the city of Antwerp. The domain largely consists of forests and directly borders the Vordenstein domain in Schoten to the south-east, and the Brasschaat municipal park to the northwest.

== History ==
The Peerdsbos is the oldest known forest domain in the present-day province of Antwerp. Historically, the forest formed a part of the Bremdonk domain, which contained acres, meadows and forests used for logging and was donated to the Antwerp Sint-Elisabeth hospital by Isabella of Breda in 1280. During the following centuries the hospital used the rents earned by leasing the property to finance its operations. Until recently, the domain was still property of the Public Centre for Social Welfare.

In the course of time, large parts of the original domain were sold and parceled out. Also, Brasschaat mayors Van Havre and Reussens bought parts of the Peerdsbos domain in the 19th century to create the community park of Brasschaat. On 1 July 1936, the city of Antwerp leased the domain for the symbolic price of 1 Belgian franc per year, and for a duration of 99 years. As a counterprestation, the city was obliged to open the domain for the general public as a recreational place. The city became thus responsible for the maintenance and exploitation of the forest and all non sub-leased buildings.

In the 1950s, planning began for the construction of the European route E19 highway connecting Antwerp with Breda and Rotterdam in the Netherlands. In the original trajectory, the highway would be built straight through the middle of the Peerdsbos forest. Later however, alternatives where proposed where the forest was largely avoided. Eventually, it was decided to construct the highway at the southern border of the domain. The final opening took place in 1971.

In 2008, Flemish minister for the Environment and Nature Hilde Crevits signed, as a representative of the Flemish government, the purchasing act of the domain. The maintenance of the domain is now provided by the Agency for Nature and Forests.

Today the Peerdsbos domain consists of about 148 ha (1.48 km²) of dense forest, with a few open fields in between.

== Facilities ==
Several facilities can be found in or near the Peerdsbos, such as a sporting centre, an indoor swimming pool a centre of the Antwerp Community Schools, used for school trips and for special education. a minigolf, a playground and a brasserie.
