= Barcza System =

Position: a8 black rook, b8 black knight, c8 black bishop, d8 black queen, e8 black king, f8 black bishop, g8 black knight, h8 black rook, a7 black pawn, b7 black pawn, c7 black pawn, d7 black pawn, e7 black pawn, f7 black pawn, g7 black pawn, h7 black pawn, f3 white knight, g3 white pawn, a2 white pawn, b2 white pawn, c2 white pawn, d2 white pawn, e2 white pawn, f2 white pawn, g2 white bishop, h2 white pawn, a1 white rook, b1 white knight, c1 white bishop, d1 white queen, f1 white rook, g1 white king
- Moves: Nf3 g3 Bg2 0-0
- ECO: A07
- Named after: Gedeon Barcza

The Barcza System is a chess opening system played by White, comprising the moves Nf3, g3, Bg2 and 0-0, regarded as non-committal moves whilst Black exposes their intention. It is named after the Hungarian grandmaster Gedeon Barcza who employed the opening on many occasions throughout his career.

After playing the four moves outlined above White will usually choose to direct play into another opening system such as the Réti Opening (by playing c4), the King's Indian Attack (by playing d3, Nbd2 and e4), the Catalan (by playing d4 and c4), or the Hippopotamus (by playing b3 and Bb2). The Barcza System is thus essentially a transpositional tool where White delays committing to a specific structure until it is clear how Black intends to develop. The Barcza System only has independent significance on the rare occasions where play does not enter another opening complex.

The Barcza System has been suggested as a universal system ideal for club players by grandmasters such as Lajos Portisch, David Bronstein and Yasser Seirawan.
