= Shama Yisrael =

American chess player (born 2004)

Personal information
- Born: 2004 (age 21–22) Miami, Florida

Chess career
- Country: United States
- Peak rating: 2014 (September 2025)

Shama Yisrael is an American chess player.

== Chess career ==
She began playing chess in 2014 and developed her skills at a local library. She is coached by Otis Wilson and is a member of the 954 Chess Club, based in Coral Springs, Florida.

In March 2022, she was the No. 7 rated 18-year-old girl in the USCF rankings.

In April 2022, Yisrael (rated 1695 FIDE) scored a win against Makaio Krienke (who was rated 2131 FIDE) in a game that lasted 32 moves at the Space Coast Open Chess Festival in Melbourne, Florida.

In June 2024, she held grandmaster Aleksa Striković to a draw in the 11th Summer Solstice Open held in Boca Raton, Florida.

In July 2024, she became the first African-American woman to achieve the rank of National Master after surpassing a USCF rating of 2200 by defeating Frank Castillo in the Pinecrest Independence Open. She was followed in this achievement one month later by Jessica Hyatt.
