= Sergei Beshukov =

Chess Grandmaster and FIDE arbiter (1971–2024)

Personal information
- Full name: Sergei Aslanovich Beshukov
- Born: 1 April 1971
- Died: 9 June 2024 (aged 53)

Chess career
- Country: Russia
- Title: Grandmaster (1994)
- FIDE rating: 2432 (July 2026)
- Peak rating: 2517 (April 2003)

Sergei Aslanovich Beshukov (Russian: Сергей Асланович Бешуков; 1 April 1971 – 8 June 2024) was a Russian chess player. He won the International Master (IM) title in 1992 and grandmaster (GM) title in 1994, and was a FIDE Arbiter (2018) and International Organizer (2019).

Born on 1 April 1971, he died after a long illness on 8 June 2024, at the age of 53.

== Notable tournaments ==
Tournament Name	Year	ELO	Points
Russian Winter op (Moscow)	1991	2355	5.0
Helsinki Open Tournament	1992	2500	5.0
Novgorod Open Tournament	1999	2511	6.0
White Nights Tournament	2001	2463	6.0
54th Russian Chess Championship	2001	2463	4.5
9th Dolomiti Open 2018	2018	2402	6.0
