= Zhao Chenxi =

Chinese chess grandmaster (born 2002)

Personal information
- Born: January 2002 (age 24) Shenzhen, Guangdong

Chess career
- Country: China
- Title: Grandmaster (2025)
- FIDE rating: 2515 (November 2026)
- Peak rating: 2515 (September 2026)

Zhao Chenxi (Chinese: 赵晨曦) is a Chinese chess grandmaster.

== Chess career ==
In December 2022, he played for the Chinese team (alongside Huang Renjie, Yan Tianqi, and Chu Ruotong) in the China vs. Caribbean chess match, in which they emerged as the victors.

In November 2025, he finished in second place behind grandmaster Lê Tuấn Minh and ahead of grandmaster Tin Jingyao in the blitz chess category of the Asian Mind Sports Conference & Festival.

He achieved the Grandmaster title in 2025 after earning his norms at the:

- Chinese Chess Championship in May 2024
- Belt and Road China International Open in August 2025; in which he earned two norms
