= Brasschaat =

- Municipality
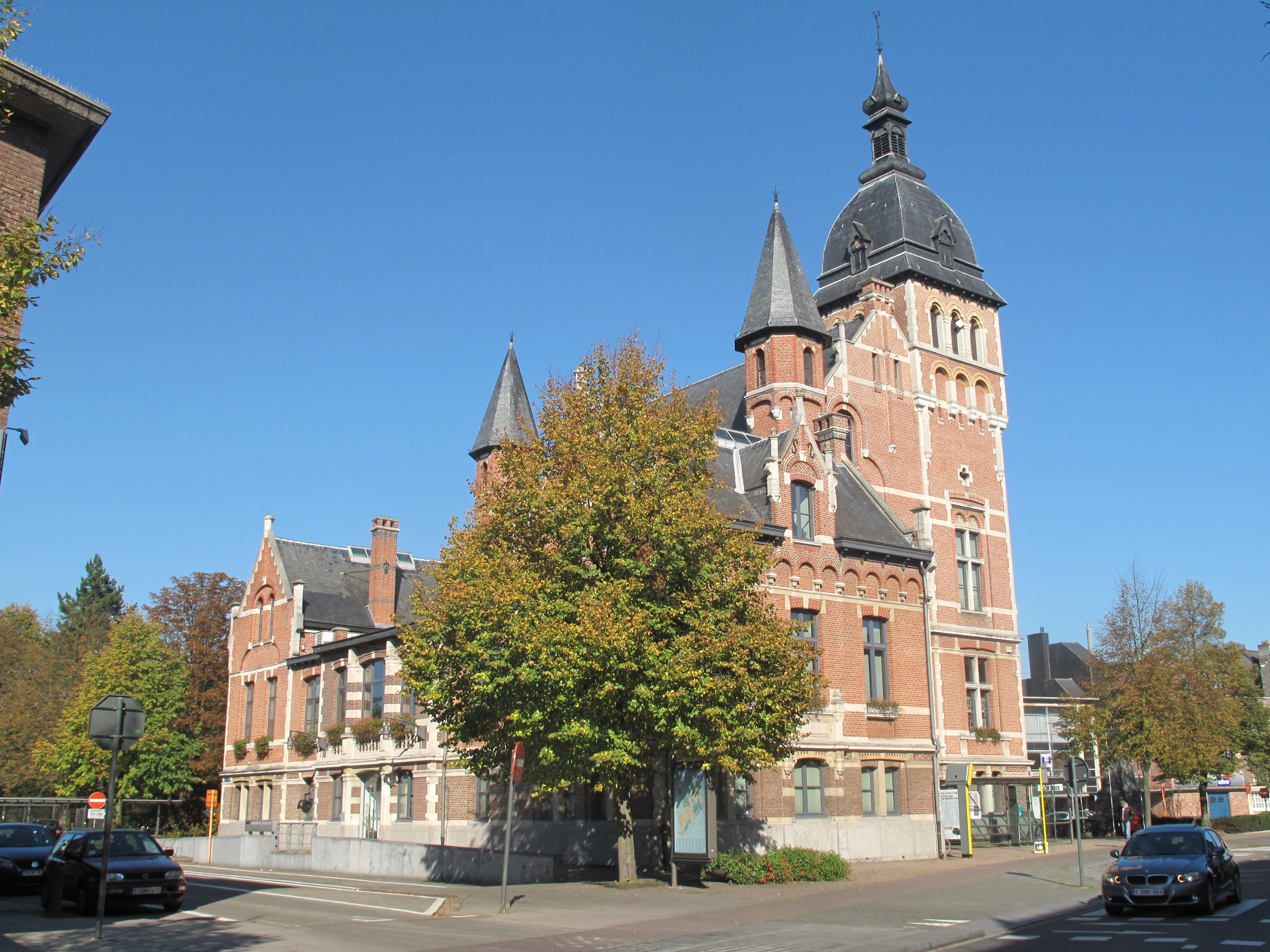

- Flag Coat of arms

- Location of Brasschaat in the province of Antwerp
- Interactive map of Brasschaat
- Location in Belgium
- Coordinates: 51°18′N 04°30′E
- Country: Belgium
- Community: Flemish Community
- Region: Flemish Region
- Province: Antwerp
- Arrondissement: Antwerp

Government
  - Mayor: Jan Jambon (N-VA)
  - Governing parties: N-VA, Open VLD

Area
  - Total: 38.58 km^{2} (14.90 sq mi)

Population (2020-01-01)
  - Total: 38,223
  - Density: 990.7/km^{2} (2,566/sq mi)
- Postal codes: 2930
- NIS code: 11008
- Area codes: 03
- Website: www.brasschaat.be

Brasschaat (Dutch pronunciation: [brɑˈsxaːt]) is a municipality located in Flanders, one of the three regions of Belgium, and in the Flemish province of Antwerp. The municipality only comprises the town of Brasschaat proper. In November 2006, Brasschaat won the LivCom-Award 2006 for the most livable municipality in the world.

== History ==
=== Origins ===
The history of Brasschaat started with Celtic settlements. The Gallic tribe of the Belgae displaced them and were in turn conquered by the Romans, who built a major road in the area. After the Germanic invasions in the 3rd and 4th century, the whole region was Christianized. In the Middle Ages the little river Laar, flowing through the woods of the municipality, served as a natural bordermark between the Bishopric of Liège and the Bishopric of Cambrai.

=== Middle Ages ===
The first mention of Breesgata, sometimes also spelt Brexgata, dates from 1269. In 1482, a convent of nuns was founded here, traces of which can still be seen today. The village of Brasschaat belonged geographically to the Campine region, but politically and ecclesiastically was part of the Bishopric of Liège until 1569. At that time, the village had about 4,500 inhabitants and 383 horses. The end of the 16th century was particularly hard on the population. In the span of 25 years, the wars between Catholics and Protestants greatly reduced the population to 420 people and 59 horses. At the end of the plague pandemic that struck the community in 1610, only 26 families were left. The guild of Sint-Antonius, currently still the oldest local association, was founded in 1667.

=== Modern times ===
In 1823, Brasschaat became theoretically a municipality of its own, separate from Ekeren. It named its own mayor and municipal council the following year. Its independence would, however, be recognized only in 1830.

Because of its strategic position in the defence of the port of Antwerp, Brasschaat became an important military outpost during World War I. The Brasschaat fort, still visible today, was built in 1912. Between 1937 and 1939 the fortifications were expanded with additional bunkers and a large antitank ditch. Many of these old military buildings nowadays host colonies of bats.

In 1945, a school in Brasschaat run by Averbode Abbey was hit by a V-1 flying bomb, killing a monk and three priests.

The ancient Brexgata name is found in the designation of an international university association seated in Strasbourg (France). The name was chosen in homage to the municipality of Brasschaat; the organisation's historical research project was initiated in this town in 1999.

== Folklore ==
- The yearly Dorpsdag ("village day") takes place on the first Sunday in September and features a procession commemorating the consecration of the main chapel in 1753.

== Sights ==
- Brasschaat is known as a park town (gemeente der parken). This includes various woods and former shooting ranges. One of the best-known nature preservations around Brasschaat is De Inslag, which includes 149 ha of woods and pastures as well as the antitank ditch mentioned above.
- The De Mik castle, complete with drawbridge, is surrounded by English gardens and an arboretum.
- The Brasschaat area also houses a petting farm and an artillery museum.
- Brasschaat is also known for the "Peerdsbos". This is a nature and recreation area.
- Brasschaat is renowned in Belgium for its long high street lined with various shops, cafes and bars. The highly affluent reputation of Brasschaat is reflected in the street's selection of expensive jewellers, designer clothing stores and fashionable bars and cafes.
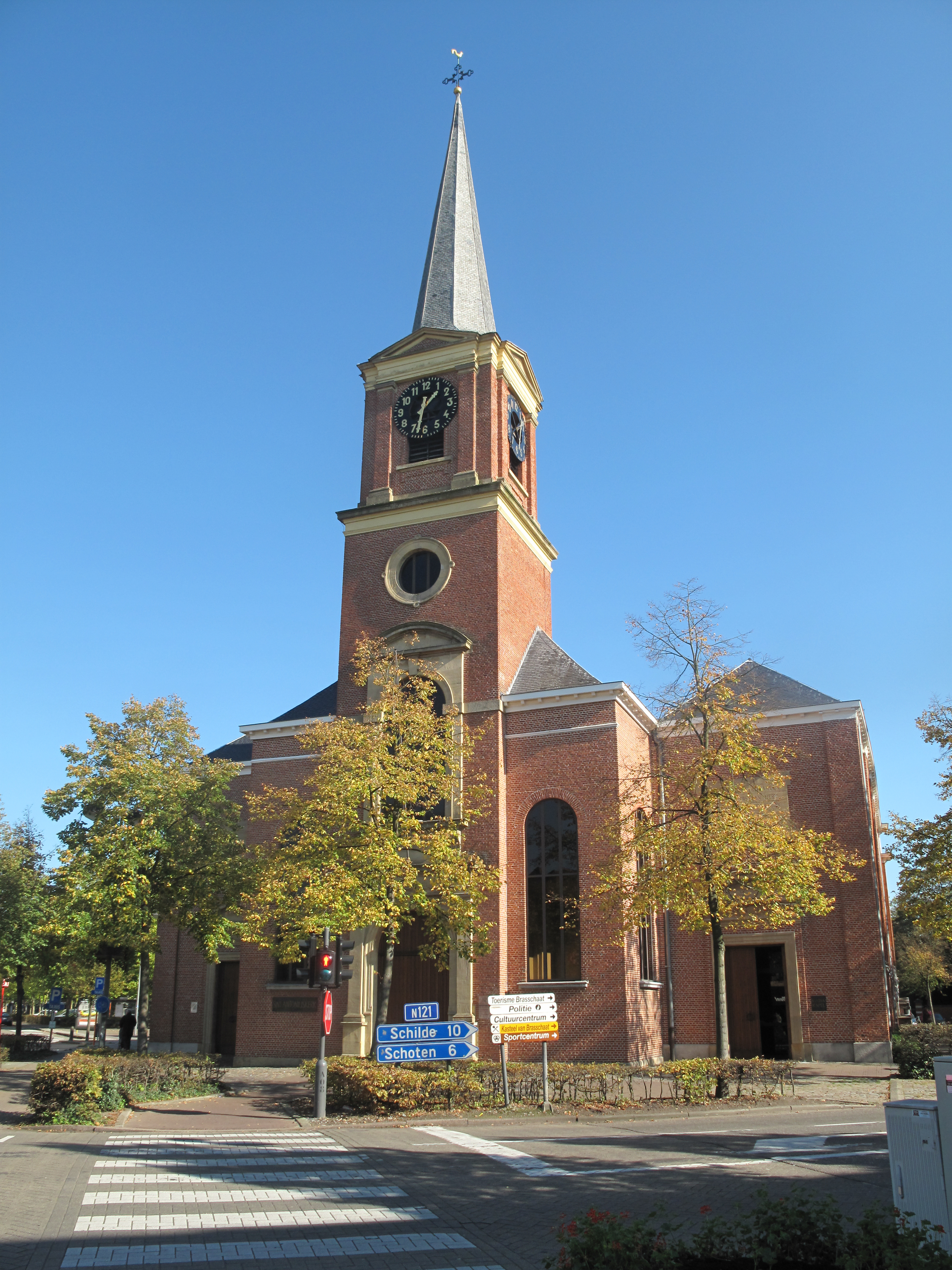
Brasschaat church

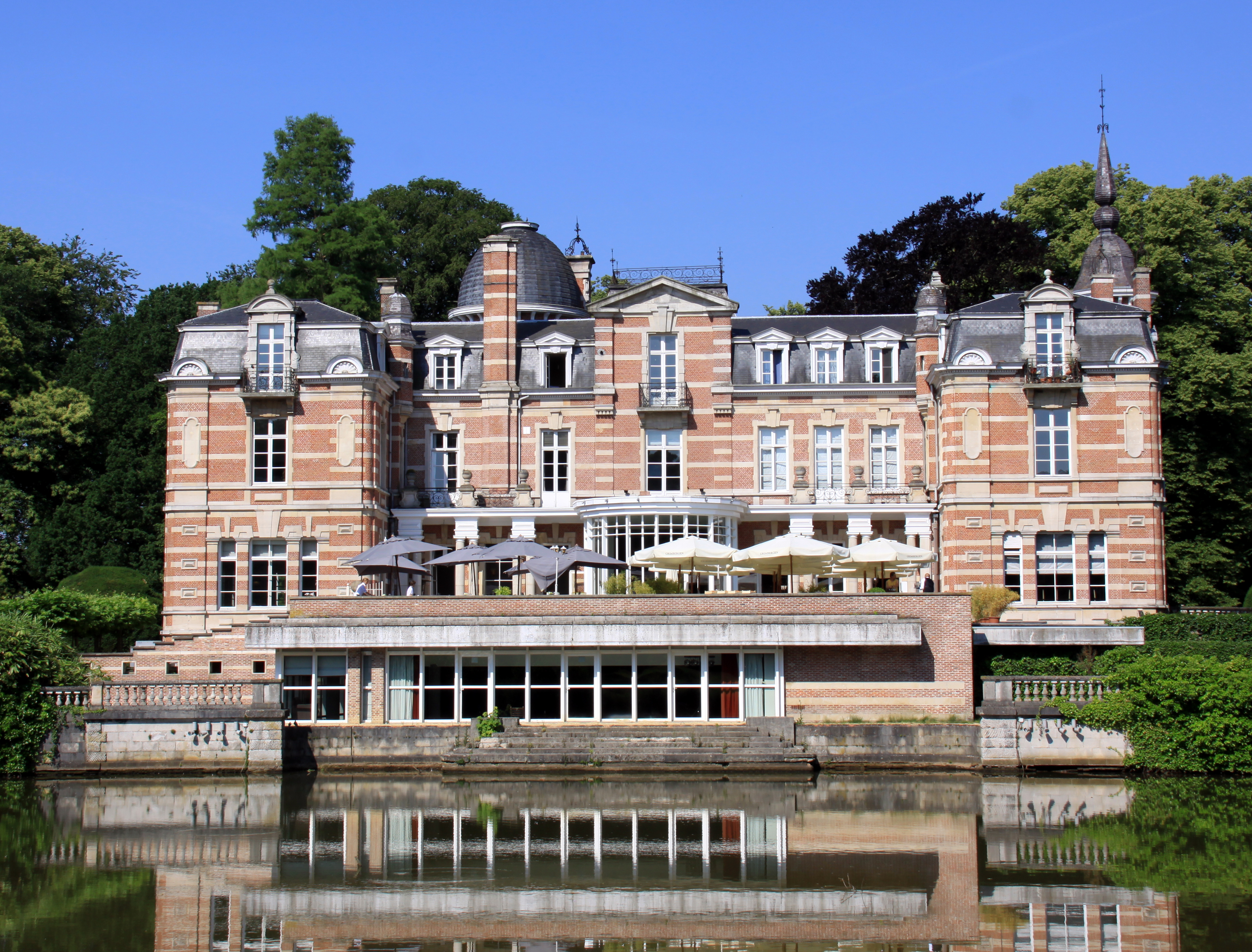
Castle of Brasschaat, 19th century

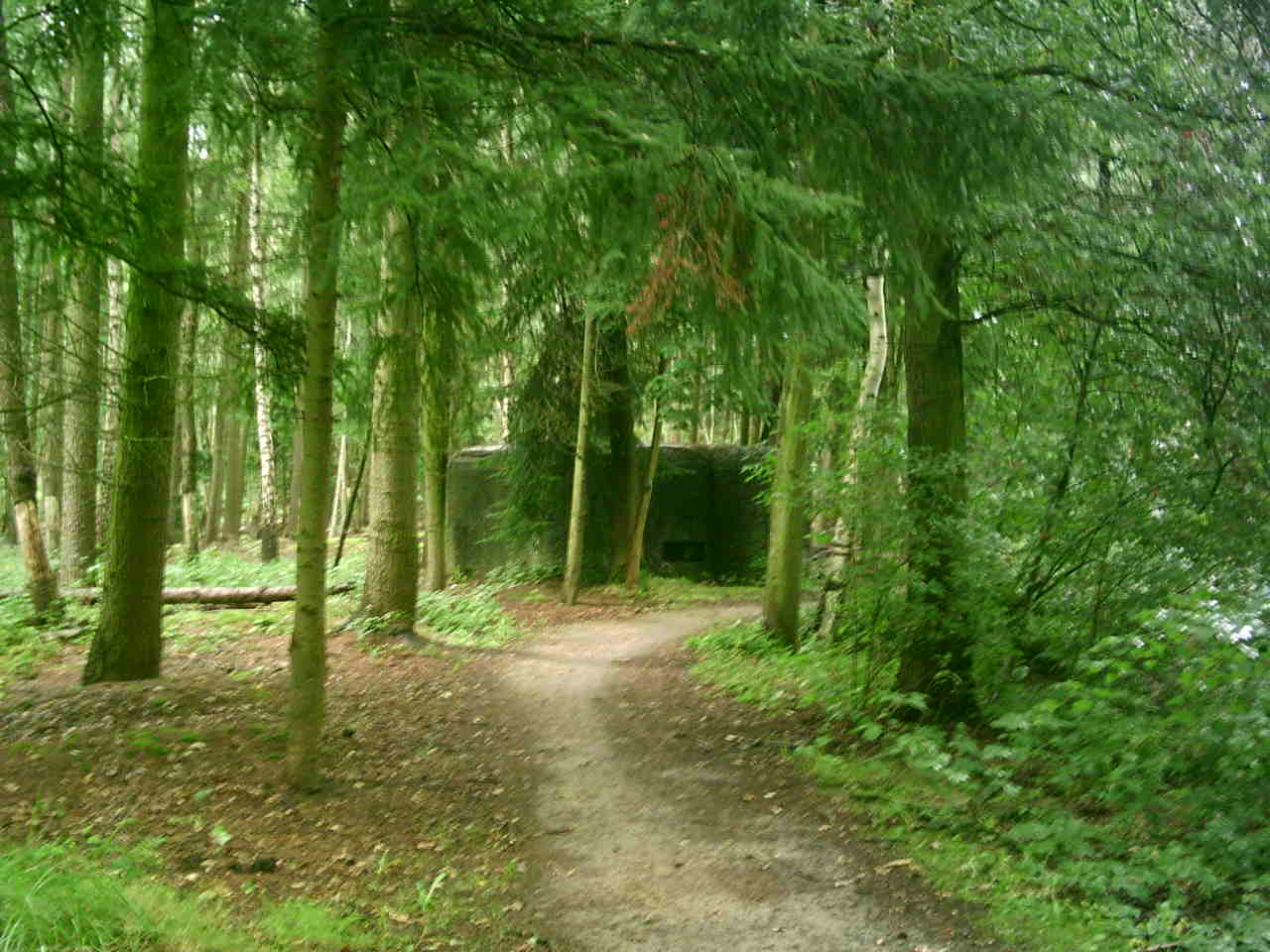
Bunker and antitank ditch in De Inslag

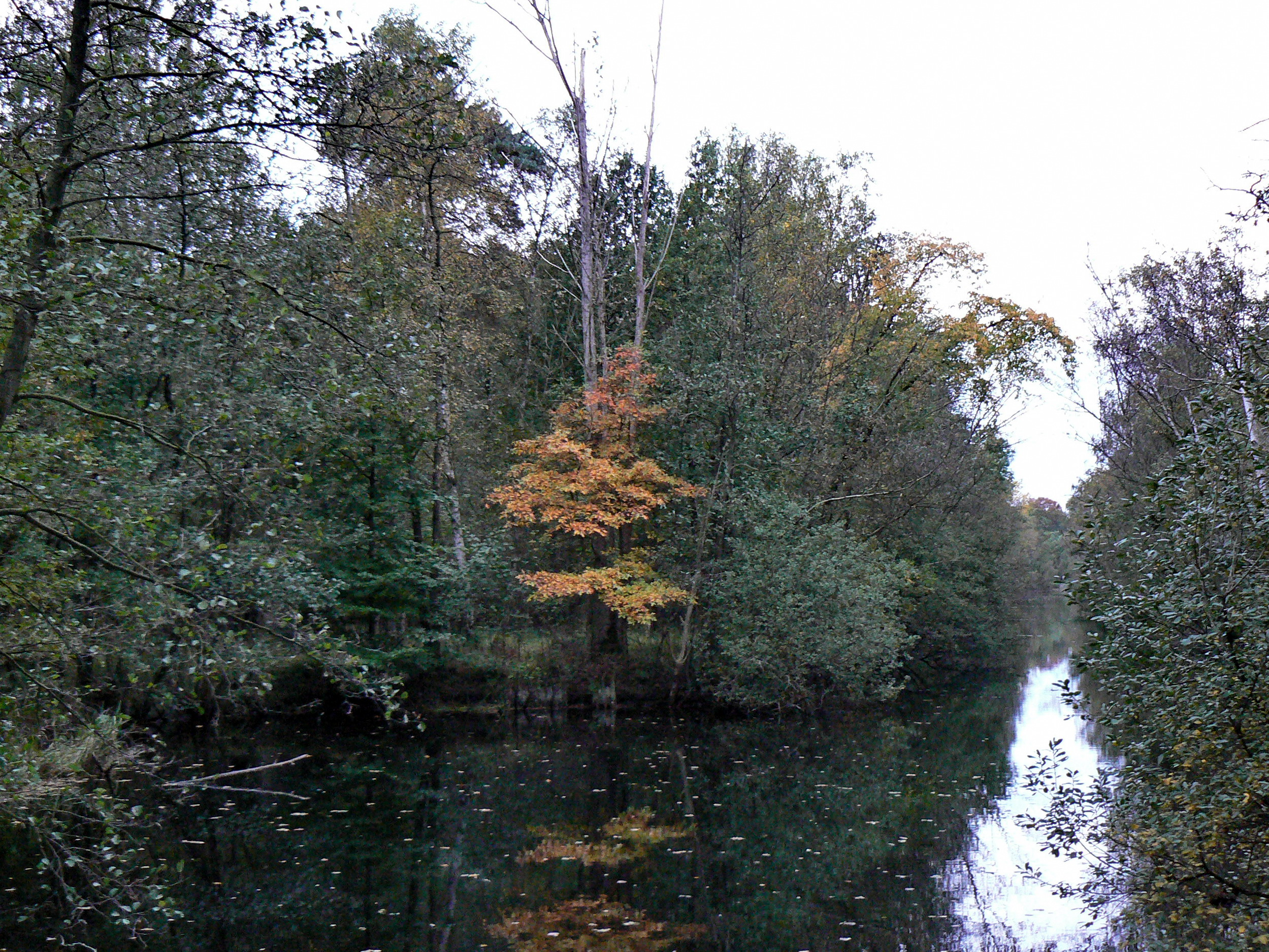
Nature preservation area De Inslag

== Notable inhabitants ==
- Gerolf Annemans (born 1958), politician
- Jozef De Beenhouwer (born 1948), musician
- Jean-Marie Pfaff, football goalkeeper
- Maxim Van Gils, professional cyclist
- Andy Van Vliet (born 1995), basketball player for Bnei Herzliya Basket in the Israeli Basketball Premier League

== Sports ==
The town hosts a couple of famous sports events, the biggest one being the yearly Premium European Cup triathlon. Its Hoogboom Military Camp hosted the Olympic trap and 100-metre running deer shooting events for the 1920 Summer Olympics in neighboring Antwerp.

== Twin cities ==
- Germany: Bad Neuenahr-Ahrweiler
- Bolivia: Tarija

== Climate ==
Climate data for Brasschaat (1991−2020 normals)
Month	Jan	Feb	Mar	Apr	May	Jun	Jul	Aug	Sep	Oct	Nov	Dec	Year
Mean daily maximum °C (°F)	6.7 (44.1)	7.6 (45.7)	11.1 (52.0)	15.4 (59.7)	18.9 (66.0)	21.5 (70.7)	23.5 (74.3)	23.4 (74.1)	19.9 (67.8)	15.3 (59.5)	10.3 (50.5)	7.0 (44.6)	15.1 (59.2)
Daily mean °C (°F)	3.8 (38.8)	4.2 (39.6)	6.9 (44.4)	10.1 (50.2)	13.8 (56.8)	16.6 (61.9)	18.7 (65.7)	18.4 (65.1)	15.2 (59.4)	11.3 (52.3)	7.2 (45.0)	4.4 (39.9)	10.9 (51.6)
Mean daily minimum °C (°F)	1.0 (33.8)	0.9 (33.6)	2.6 (36.7)	4.8 (40.6)	8.7 (47.7)	11.8 (53.2)	13.8 (56.8)	13.3 (55.9)	10.4 (50.7)	7.3 (45.1)	4.1 (39.4)	1.7 (35.1)	6.7 (44.1)
Average precipitation mm (inches)	77.4 (3.05)	70.4 (2.77)	62.4 (2.46)	47.0 (1.85)	65.8 (2.59)	81.6 (3.21)	89.1 (3.51)	90.6 (3.57)	82.3 (3.24)	80.3 (3.16)	90.6 (3.57)	100.2 (3.94)	937.8 (36.92)
Average precipitation days (≥ 1.0 mm)	13.8	12.3	11.4	9.1	10.2	10.8	10.7	11.2	10.6	11.7	14.0	15.2	140.8
Mean monthly sunshine hours	60	76	132	188	218	215	221	208	161	114	65	50	1,709
Source: Royal Meteorological Institute
