= Jessica Hyatt =

American chess player (born 2005)

Personal information
- Born: 2005 (age 20–21) Brooklyn, New York

Chess career
- Country: United States
- Peak rating: 2010 (September 2026)

Jessica Hyatt (born 2005) is an American chess player who is one of the highest rated African-American females in history. Hyatt beat two grandmaster chess players in 2021 and 2022, being among the few African-American female players to have done it.

== Chess career ==
In 2019, Hyatt won the New York State Scholastic Championships and was the 2023 KCF All-Girls Nationals Champion. Hyatt is a 5x National USA Youth Team member.

In 2021, she defeated Grandmaster Michael Rohde and in 2022 Grandmaster Abhimanyu Mishra in blitz exhibitions, becoming one of a few African-American female players to have beaten a grandmaster.

In November 2023, she caused an upset at the World Youth Chess Championship, where she (rated 1818) drew with Liya Kurmangaliyeva (rated 2236).

In June 2024, she held a simultaneous exhibition at the Detroit Institute of Arts, where she won all of her games.

In August 2024, Hyatt became the youngest African-American woman to achieve the National Master title, and the second in the world, only one month after Shama Yisrael became the first.

== Personal life ==
She attended the Success Academy High School of the Liberal Arts in Manhattan.
