= Schoten =

Municipality in Antwerp Province, Belgium

- Municipality
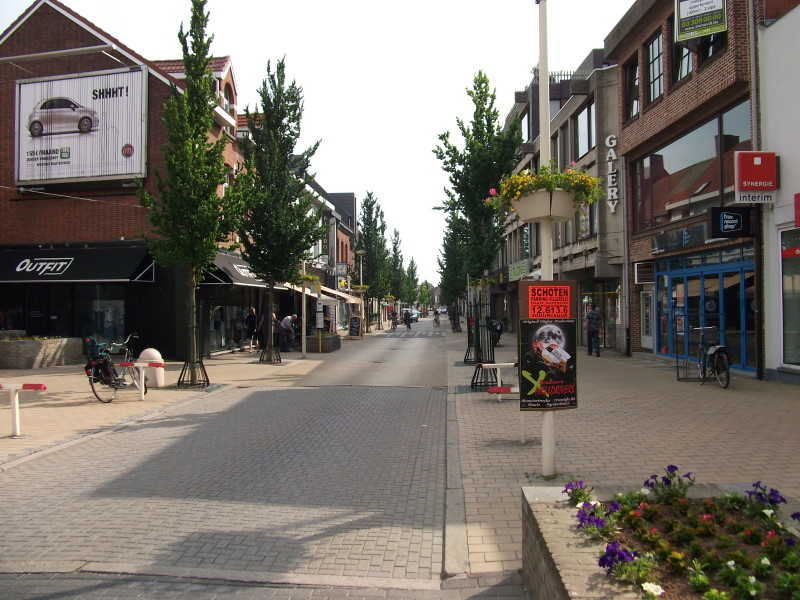

- Flag Coat of arms

- Location of Schoten in Antwerp Province
- Interactive map of Schoten
- Location in Belgium
- Coordinates: 51°15′N 04°30′E
- Country: Belgium
- Community: Flemish Community
- Region: Flemish Region
- Province: Antwerp
- Arrondissement: Antwerp

Government
  - Mayor: Maarten De Veuster (N-VA)
  - Governing parties: N-VA and CD&V

Area
  - Total: 29.51 km^{2} (11.39 sq mi)

Population (2025-01-01)
  - Total: 34,926
  - Density: 1,184/km^{2} (3,065/sq mi)
- Postal codes: 2900
- NIS code: 11040
- Area codes: 03
- Website: www.schoten.be

Schoten (Dutch pronunciation: [ˈsxoːtə(n)]) is a municipality located in Antwerp Province, Belgium. The municipality only comprises the town of Schoten proper. As of 1 January 2020 Schoten has a total population of 34,311. The total area is 29.55 km^{2} (11.41 sq mi) which gives a population density of 1,122/km^{2} (2,910/sq mi). Schoten borders the Antwerp districts Merksem to the west and Deurne to the south west. Neighboring municipalities include Brasschaat to the north, Brecht to the north east, Schilde to the east, and Wijnegem to the south.

== History ==
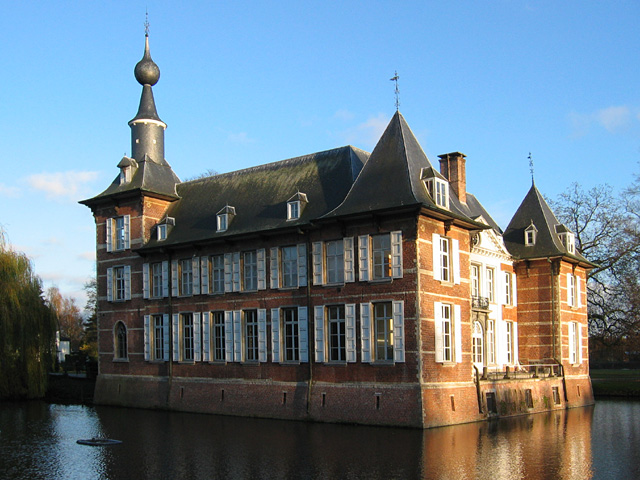
Schoten castle

=== Early Middle Ages ===
The history and usage of the name Schoten may have come from the name given to the wooden dividing walls (schot in Dutch) that were driven in the ground to separate private property. The Christianization of the area dates from the end of the 7th century, under the influence of Abbot Ursmarus, of Lobbes Abbey, which owned property here.

In the 12th century, the territory was under the political authority of the lords of Breda, then of the lords of Bergen-op-Zoom. Religiously, it was administered by the Villers Abbey.

=== 16th century until today ===
Already by the beginning of the 16th century, well-off burghers and merchants from neighboring Antwerp built castles in Schoten as secondary residences. The local community succeeded, however, in maintaining its rural Campine character until well into the 19th century. Industry first developed on the border with Merksem, later along the Albert Canal. Much of the rest of the town's territory was kept green and was again used by neighboring Antwerp residents for building extensive villas such as Koningshof and Schotenhof. Today about 30% of Schoten's territory still consists of forested areas, a great achievement given its location only 10 km (6 mi) away from the center of Antwerp.

== Main sights ==
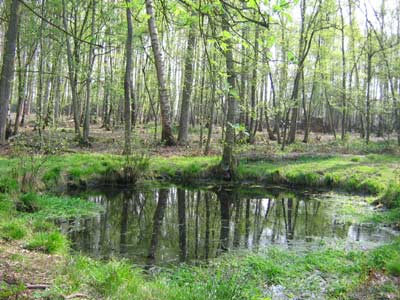
’t Asbroek nature reservation in Schoten

- The water-encircled Schoten castle started as a farm in the 13th century, and is now converted into a local cultural centre.
- The main square is lined with a Gothic Revival city hall and adorned with a Till Eulenspiegel fountain.
- The Villers castle also dates from the 13th century, while the Gothic-style church of St-Cordula dates from the 15th century.
- Schoten also has a number of nature reservations and wooded areas, such as the Peerdsbos, the Vordensteyn domain, 't Asbroek, Wijtschot or the municipal park.
- Schotenhof is an area of Schoten located in the north-east of the municipality. It was created in the beginning of the 20th century, a time when in several wood-rich municipalities around Antwerp the local castles were divided into lots to allow for the building of residential houses and vacation cottages.

== Events and Sports ==
- The World Festival of Folklore Schoten, a folk dance festivity founded in 1959, takes place annually in the summer.
- The Scheldeprijs, an annual cycling race taking place in April, starts in Antwerp and finishes in Schoten.
- The local football club is the KFC Schoten SK.

== Politics ==
=== Municipal council ===
The municipal council, per the outcome of the 2018 local elections, is a coalition of NV-A (16 seats) and Open-VLD (1 seat), a total of 17 out of 31 seats.

=== Council of Mayor and Aldermen ===
Since 2018, the Council of Mayor and Aldermen, the municipal executive board, consists of:

Council of Mayor and Aldermen (2018-now)
Mayor	Maarten De Veuster (N-VA)
Alderman	1. Iefke Hendrickx (N-VA); 2. Wouter Rombouts (N-VA); 3. Charlotte Klima (N-VA); 4. Paul Valkeniers (Open VLD); 5. Paul De Swaef (N-VA); 6. Walter Brat (N-VA); 7. Veronique d’Exelle (N-VA)

== Infrastructure ==
170 metres tall lattice tower at 51°17'33"N 4°32'24"E, which is an important site for FM- and TV-broadcasting for the Antwerp area.

== Economy ==
- Schoten was the place where the Belgian fast-food restaurant Quick established its first outlet in 1971.

== Notable citizens ==
- Bob Mendes, writer of thrillers and detective stories (b. 1928 d. 2021)
- Michel A. J. Georges, biologist and professor at the University of Liège (b. 1959)
- Marie-Rose Morel, politician (b. 1972 d. 2011)
- Véronique De Kock, Miss Belgium 1995 (b. 1977)
- Geert Steurs, professional road bicycle racer (b. 1981)
- Thor Salden, also known as Thor!, singer (b. 1997)
- Harrie Hendrickx, former mayor

== International relations ==
=== Twin towns – sister cities ===
Schoten is twinned with:

- Tarnów, Poland
- Voorschoten, Netherlands

== See also ==
- Deuzeld, a neighborhood of Schoten that is part of the Antwerp agglomeration.
