= Vordenstein park =

Vordenstein
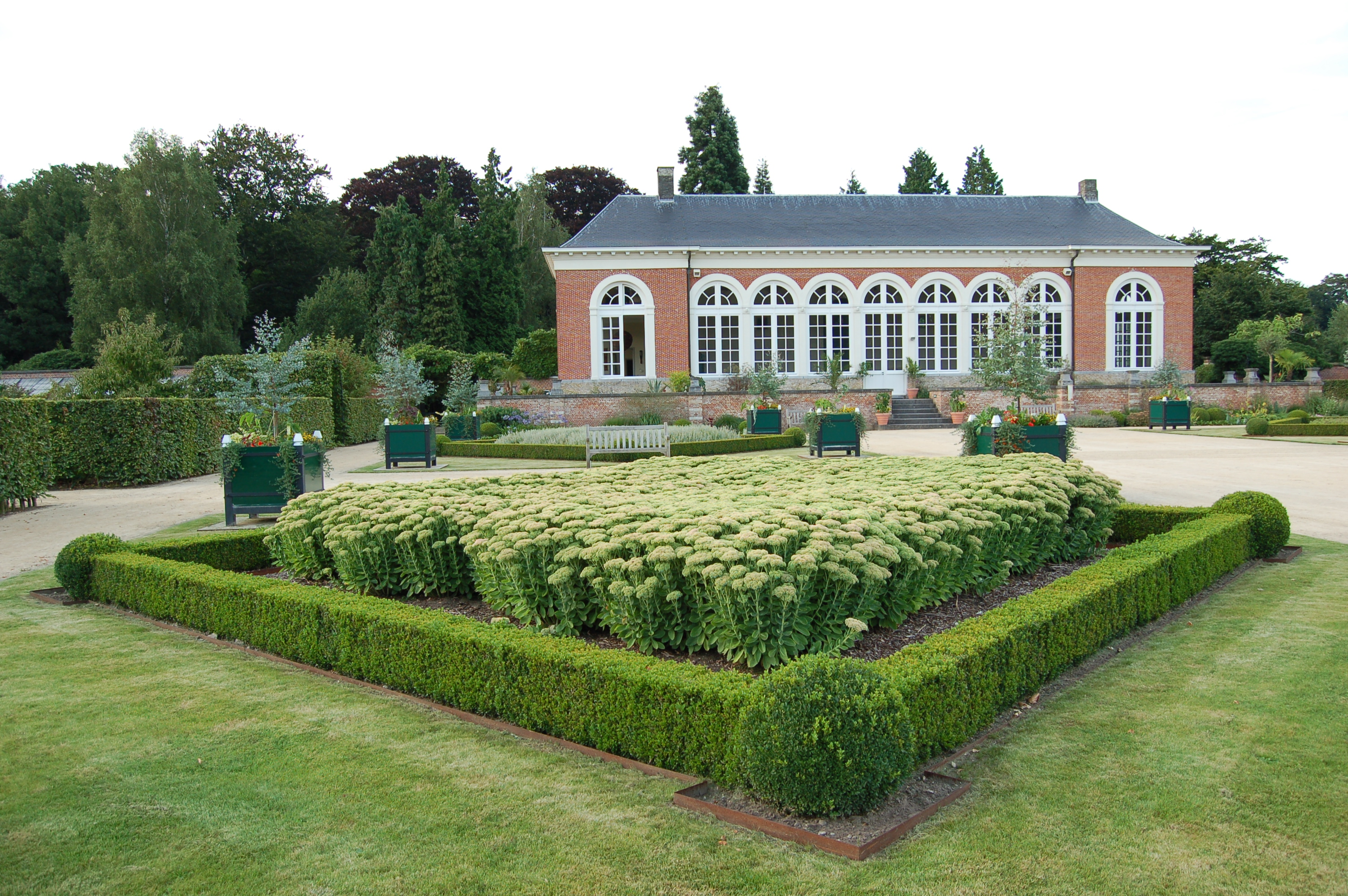
- The orangerie in neoclassical style
- Interactive map of Vordenstein
- Location: Schoten
- Nearest city: Antwerp
- Coordinates: 51°15′34″N 4°29′17″E
- Area: 110 ha (270 acres)
- Created: 14th century
- Operator: Agency for Nature and Forests

The Vordenstein domain is a park in the Belgian municipality of Schoten, northeast of Antwerp. It separated from the adjacent Peerdsbos forest by the E19 highway to the North.

== History ==
The Vordenstein domain was created in the 14th century out of the Hof ter Katen and the Hof van de Werve. At that time, the domain had a mainly agrarian function, with the feudal lord leasing patches of the land to various farmers. Starting in the 18th century, the domain gradually evolved into a recreational estate with a castle and an extensive pleasure garden, owned by a succession of wealthy families from Antwerp as a countryside retreat. In 1980 the majority of the park was eventually bought by the Belgian state, and subsequently opened to the public. A smaller part in the middle of the domain remains privately owned by the De Pret family that inherited the domain at the beginning of the 20th century.

== Layout ==
The majority of the present day layout stems from the 18th and 19th centuries. The oldest part of the park, the so-called Sterrenbos in the northeastern corner, was laid out in a baroque and geometrical fashion, inspired by the French gardens of Versailles. At the end of the 18th century, a forest in romantic style was planted in the middle of the park. The southwestern part of the domain was laid out in 1850 as an English landscape garden, with a pond, patches of trees and exotic plants. In the southeast lies the vegetable garden and the orangerie, which was built in the early 19th century, and is now used as a cafe. The forests in the northwest and the east were only planted at the end of the 19th century on what had been land used for farming.
