= Matthew Wadsworth (chess player) =

English chess grandmaster (born 2000)

Personal information
- Born: June 27, 2000 (age 26) Maidenhead, England

Chess career
- Country: England
- Title: Grandmaster (2025)
- FIDE rating: 2516 (July 2026)
- Peak rating: 2532 (April 2026)

Matthew J. Wadsworth is an English chess grandmaster.

== Career ==
Wadsworth began playing chess at the age of 5 after being introduced to the game by his father. He then began attending the Maidenhead Junior Chess Club run by Nigel Dennis.

In August 2024, he finished in third place at the British Chess Championship, during which he defeated rising prodigy Shreyas Royal.

In February 2025, he achieved his final GM norm at the Isle of Wight tournament, where he tied for first place with grandmasters Bobby Cheng, Sebastian Bogner, and Boris Chatalbashev. He was ranked in second place after tiebreaks.

In April 2025, he met all of the requirements for the Grandmaster title after surpassing the 2500 rating mark at the ChessOrg-Schachfestival A-Open tournament in Bad Wörishofen.

== Personal life ==
In 2022, Wadsworth graduated from Queens' College, Cambridge with a masters of science in economics.
