= Dyle (river) =

Dyle/Dijle
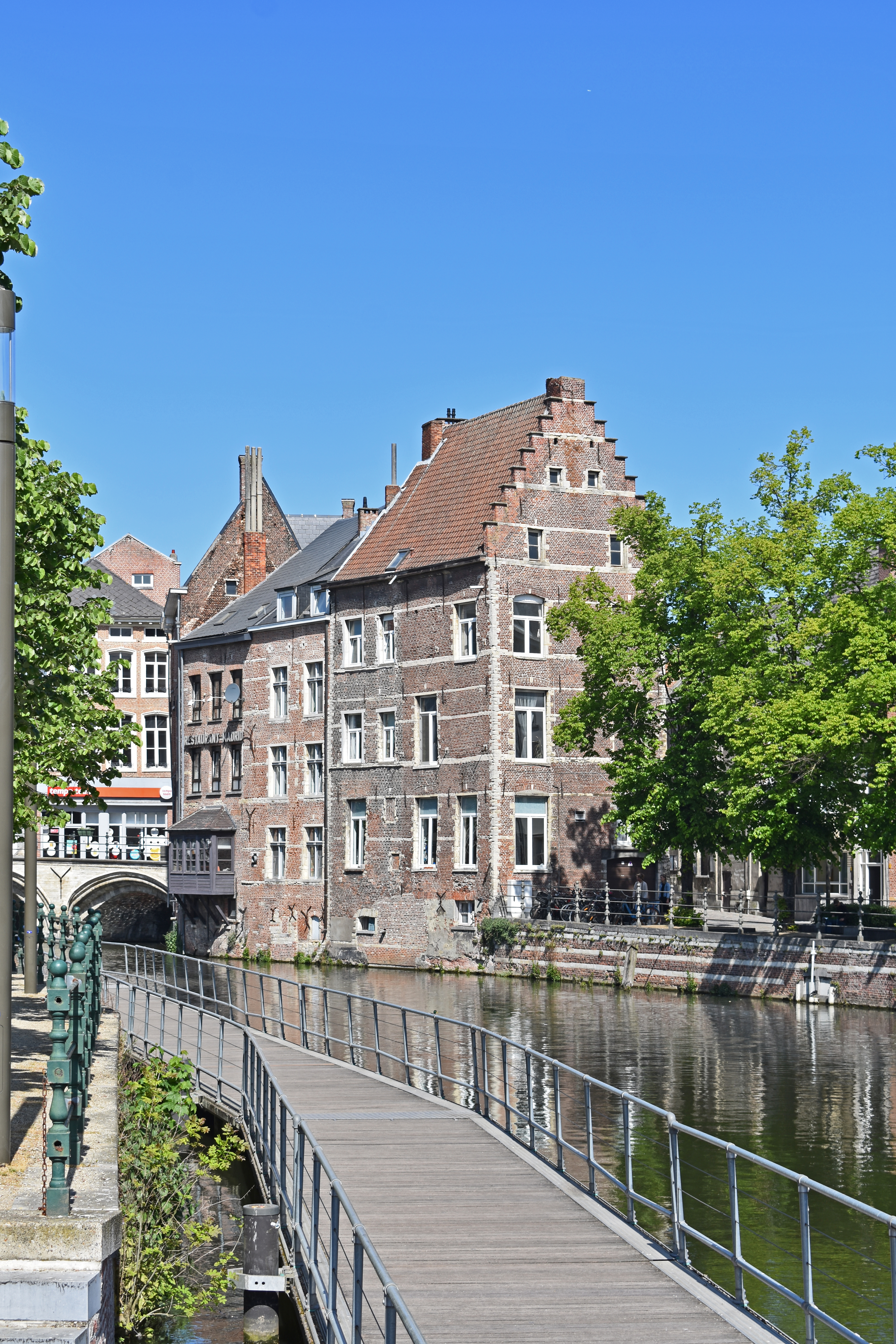
- The Dyle in Mechelen

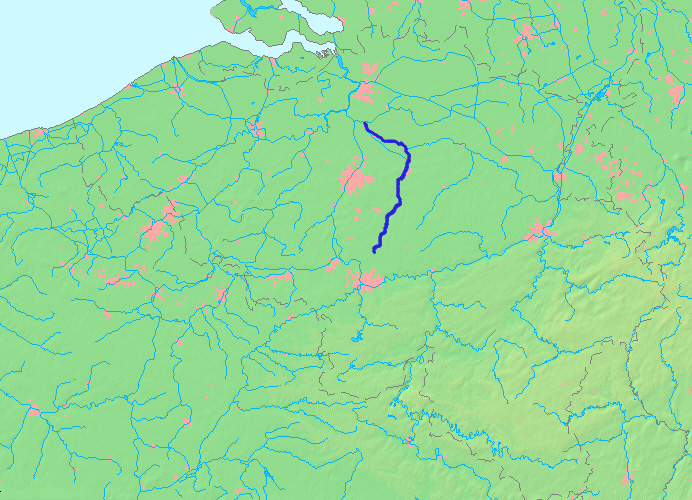
- Location of the Dyle

Location
- Country: Belgium

Physical characteristics
- Source
  - location: Walloon Brabant
- Mouth
  - location: Rupel
  - coordinates: 51.0735°N 4.4201°E
- Length: 86 kilometres (53 mi)

Basin features
- Progression: Rupel→ Scheldt→ North Sea

The Dyle (French: [dil]; Dutch: Dijle [ˈdɛilə]) is a river in central Belgium, left tributary of the Rupel. It is 86 kilometres (53 mi) long. It flows through the Belgian provinces of Walloon Brabant, Flemish Brabant and Antwerp. Its source is in Houtain-le-Val, near Nivelles in Walloon Brabant.

The most important cities along the Dyle are (starting from the source) Ottignies, Wavre, Leuven and Mechelen, the last of which is often called the 'Dijlestad' (Dyle City). The main tributaries of the Dyle are the rivers Demer (in Werchter, Rotselaar municipality), and the Zenne at the Zennegat, on the farthest outskirts of Mechelen, where the canal Leuven-Mechelen also connects. A few hundred metres downstream, the confluence of the Dyle and the Nete at Rumst forms the river Rupel, which 12 kilometres (7 mi) further comes into the Scheldt on which the Antwerp seaport is located.

The Dyle used to be navigable for small ships from Werchter on, although nowadays commercial and pleasure navigation is limited to Mechelen, the upper locks at Mechelen being closed for navigation.

== Tributaries ==
- Dyle
  - Zenne (Mechelen)
    - Maalbeek (Grimbergen)
    - Woluwe (Vilvoorde)
    - Maalbeek (Schaerbeek)
    - Molenbeek (Brussels-Laken)
    - Neerpedebeek (Anderlecht-Neerpede)
    - Zuun (Sint-Pieters-Leeuw-Zuun)
    - Geleytsbeek (Drogenbos)
    - Linkebeek (Drogenbos)
    - Molenbeek (Lot)
    - Senette (Tubize)
      - Hain (Tubize)
      - Samme (Braine-le-Comte-Ronquières)
        - Thines (Nivelles)
  - canal Leuven-Mechelen (Mechelen)
  - Vrouwvliet (Mechelen)
  - Demer (Rotselaar)
    - Velp (Halen)
    - Gete (Halen)
      - Herk (Herk-de-Stad)
      - Large Gete (Zoutleeuw)
      - Small Gete (Zoutleeuw)
  - Voer (Leuven)
  - (IJse) (Huldenberg)-(Overijse)
  - Nethen (Graven-Nethen)
  - Laan (Huldenberg-Terlanen-Sint-Agatha-Rode)
    - Zilverbeek (Rixensart-Genval)
  - Thyle (Ottignies-Louvain-la-Neuve)

== See also ==
The Dyle Plan was an unsuccessful Allied plan to stop the German advance through the flat, central plains of Belgium in 1940.

From 1795 until 1815, when Belgium, the Netherlands and parts of Germany were incorporated into France, there was a department named after the river Dyle, see Dyle (department).
