= Adolf Proost =

Belgian military (1853–1921)

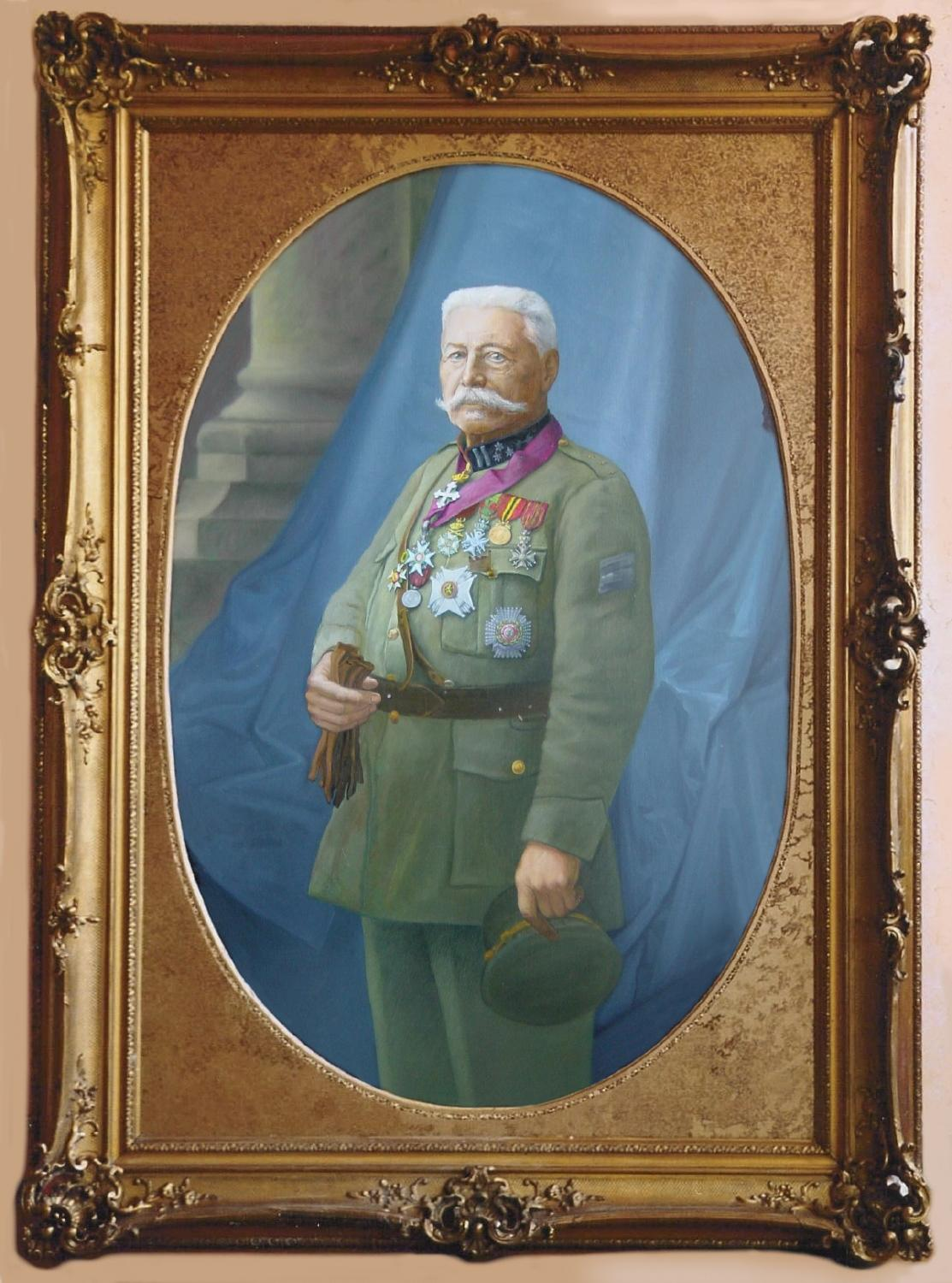
- Born: 12 February 1853; Heist-op-den-Berg, Belgium
- Died: 1 March 1921 (aged 68)
- Military career
- Allegiance: Belgium
- Branch: Belgian Armed Forces
- Rank: Lieutenant General
- Commands: 2e Cavalry Brigade (1914–1915); 1e Cavalry Division (1915–1918)
- Conflicts: World War I; Battle of Halen

Adolf Proost (1853–1921) was a Belgian lieutenant general. He played a part in the Battle of the Silver Helmets which was a battle between German and Belgian mounted army units at the start of World War I on 12 August 1914 near Halen.

== Battle of Halen ==
The confrontation has been called the last great cavalry charge with the white saber in Western Europe. Proost was commander of the 2nd Cavalry Brigade and, contrary to General De Witte's orders, decided not to deploy his lancers on the designated obscure area between the woods at Loksbergen and Halen. He chose because of the better view of the approaching Germans for another, more strategic location, at the Iron Mining farm, which became the central point of defense during the battle. The battle was a temporary success for the Belgian army, although 160 Belgians were killed against 140 Germans.

On January 5, 1915, Proost V.L.A. became commander of the 1st Cavalry Division. and on April 30, 1915 he was promoted to lieutenant general.

== Awards ==
- : Grand Officer with palm in the Order of Leopold (Belgium) (1917)
- : Croix de Guerre (Belgium)
