= Rotselaar =

Municipality in Flemish Brabant, Belgium

- Municipality
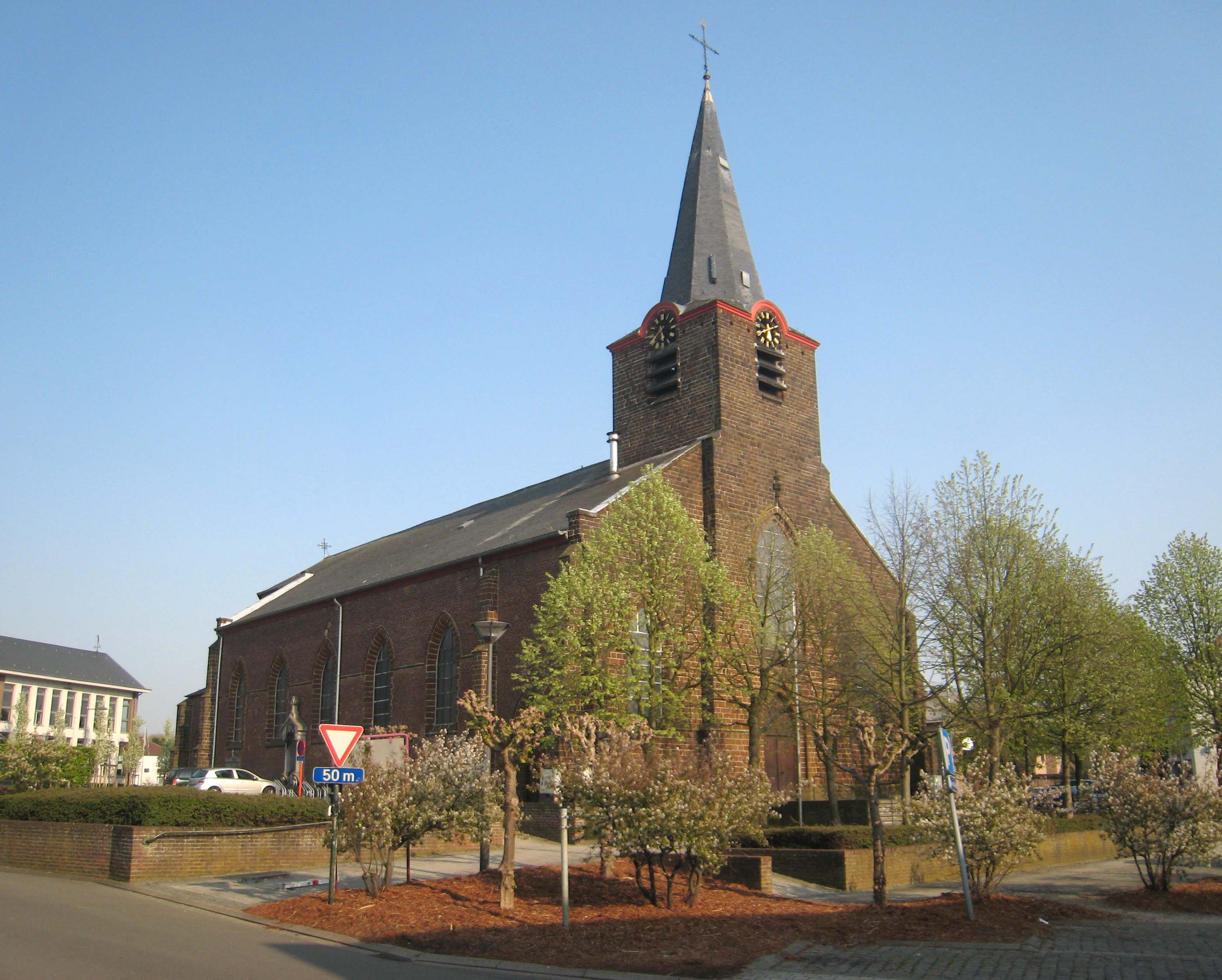
- Church in Rotselaar

- Flag Coat of arms

- Location of Rotselaar in Flemish Brabant
- Interactive map of Rotselaar
- Location in Belgium
- Coordinates: 50°57′N 04°43′E
- Country: Belgium
- Community: Flemish Community
- Region: Flemish Region
- Province: Flemish Brabant
- Arrondissement: Leuven

Government
  - Mayor: Jelle Wouters (CD&V)
  - Governing parties: CD&V, N-VA

Area
  - Total: 37.22 km^{2} (14.37 sq mi)

Population (2018-01-01)
  - Total: 16,678
  - Density: 448.1/km^{2} (1,161/sq mi)
- Postal codes: 3110, 3111, 3118
- NIS code: 24094
- Area codes: 016
- Website: rotselaar.be

Rotselaar (Dutch pronunciation: [ˈrɔtsəlaːr]) is a municipality located in the Belgian province of Flemish-Brabant, near the convergence of the Demer and the Dijle. Since 1 January 1977 the municipality comprises the towns of Rotselaar proper, Werchter and Wezemaal. On 1 January 2006 Rotselaar had a total population of 15,068. The total area is 37.57 km^{2} which gives a population density of 401 inhabitants per km^{2}.

== Geography ==
Rotselaar is located at the convergence of two rivers, the Demer and the Dijle, which in turn have the Winge and the Losting as tributaries, and the Laak River forms the border between Werchter and Tremelo to the north. It's also located at the junction of three geographical areas. In rough terms, Werchter to the north of the Demer is a part of the South Campine, Wezemaal and Rotselaar Heikant of the Hageland, whereas Rotselaar-Centre to the west of the Dijle is a part of Binnen-Vlaanderen (Inner Flanders), which is also known as Dijleland.

== History ==
Rotselaar and Wezemaal were first mentioned in written accounts in 1044. Only a century later, between 1138 and 1152, Werchter appears in historical documents.

Coat of John of Wesemaele, Marshall of Brabant

In the 12th century, Rotselaar and Wezemaal were ruled by the Duke of Brabant, whereas the Counts of Aarschot and the House of the Berthouts controlled Werchter. From about 1170, vassals of the Duke of Brabant settled at Wezemaal and Rotselaar. In the course of the 13th century, these vassals rose to the noble Hereditary Marshals of Brabant and started to "rule" the dominium of Rotselaar and Wezemaal as lords. In the 14th century, the Lords of Wezemaal and Rotselaar managed to detract Werchter (and Haacht) from the sphere of influence of the House of the Berthouts, thus uniting the three villages of Wezemaal, Werchter and Rotselaar for the first time in history, which from that moment on together formed the Land, or the Barony of Rotselaar. The Barony of Rotselaar passed into the hands of the powerful House of Croÿ in 1516, to be added to the Margraviate of Aarschot, which was later elevated to the Duchy of Aarschot in 1533.

Until deep in the 19th century, the inhabitants lived primarily of agriculture. From 1488 onwards, the population of Wezemaal, Werchter and Rotselaar was severely hit by periodically recurring wars (1488-1489, 1542, and a series of wars from 1570 up to 1750). From 1750, welfare began to increase again, first thanks to agricultural innovations and in the second half of the 19th century thanks to the effects of the Industrial Revolution.

An artillery duel was fought in Rotselaar in the First World War, known as the ‘Slag aan de Molen’ (English: Battle of the Mill). In that battle, 360 Belgian and German soldiers were killed. During the First World War, a total 67 houses were burned and 38 civilians were killed in Rotselaar.

== Etymology ==
=== Origin of the names Rotselaar, Wezemaal and Werchter ===
The origin of the placenames is unclear. Rotselaar is thought to mean "laar of Hrosda". A laar (plural form is laren) is an open spot or clearing in a forest suitable for living, laren were used quite intensively by man in the past, amongst others for grazing the cattle, and Hrosda is a male Germanic name. Wezemaal is believed to come from "Wis" and "male" (a depression), and Werchter is thought to be a watername, but the meaning of the name is unknown.

When the name of Rotselaar first appeared in written accounts, it was spelled "Rotslar". Over the centuries, this evolved into "Rotselaer", and eventually into "Rotselaar". In Middle Dutch, the "e" in "Rotselaer" was used to show that the vowel preceding it sounds longer, in modern spelling the vowel is doubled to achieve the same effect, which gives "Rotselaar".

=== Meanings of the name Rotselaar ===
The name "Rotselaar" can have four different meanings, and it is important to make a distinction between these meanings in order to avoid ambiguities. In a first meaning, "Rotselaar" refers to the whole of the municipality of Rotselaar as it exists since the merger of municipalities that came into effect on 1 January 1977 and reduced the number of autonomous municipalities in Belgium to 589. If used in this sense, the name "Rotselaar" includes Wezemaal and Werchter. The term "Groot-Rotselaar" (Greater Rotselaar) is also commonly used to refer to Rotselaar, Wezemaal and Werchter as a whole. In a second meaning, "Rotselaar" refers specifically to the town of Rotselaar proper as it existed before the merger with Wezemaal and Werchter in 1977. This is, especially within Groot-Rotselaar, the most common meaning of the name "Rotselaar". In a third meaning, "Rotselaar" refers to the historical Land of Rotselaar, which comprised not only modern-day Rotselaar, Wezemaal and Werchter, but also other villages, such as Haacht and Wakkerzeel. The name "Rotselaar" in this sense is rarely used.

Rotselaar can also have a fourth meaning, where it refers to Rotselaar-Centre, as opposed to Rotselaar Heikant, which is also referred to as simply "Heikant". Rotselaar proper (as it existed prior to 1977) consists of two parts: Rotselaar-Centre and Rotselaar Heikant. If used in this sense, the name "Rotselaar" refers only to Rotselaar-Centre and doesn't include Heikant. In most cases, the name "Rotselaar" includes Rotselaar Heikant, but the name "Heikant" is commonly used to distinguish between the two parts of Rotselaar.

== Local government ==
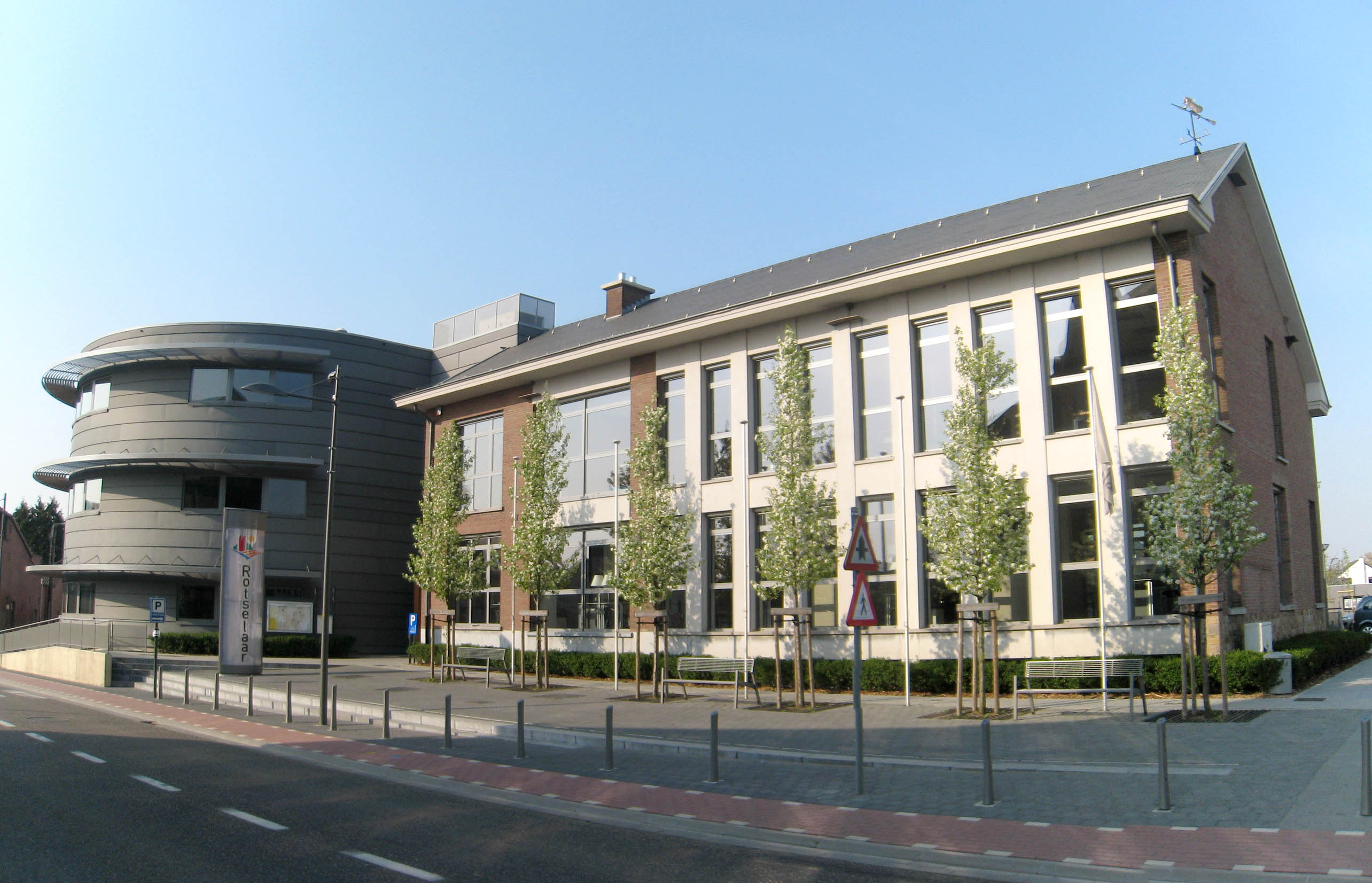
Rotselaar town hall

=== Municipal Council ===
The Municipal Council is a unicameral body composed of 25 councillors, including the mayor and aldermen. The councillors are elected directly by the voters in the municipality. The Municipal Council is renewed entirely every six years. The municipal elections of 8 October 2006 were the first municipal and provincial elections in Belgium since the transfer of the competence with regards to the municipalities and provinces from the Federal Government to the Regions on 13 June 2001.

The Municipal Council is responsible for everything that is of local interest. This organ draws up rules and ordinances, establishes municipal taxes, approves the budget and the accounts of the municipality, scrutinises the local services, and looks after the interests of its population in general (spatial planning, road building, security, health, youth, sport,...). The council also appoints the aldermen. The mayor is nominated by the majority and appointed by the Flemish Government. The council meets once per month.

Between 2007 and 2013, the majority consisted of the CD&V/N-VA combined list, with 14 out of 25 seats. VLD (5 seats), SP.A-Spirit (2 seats), Groen!Sociaal (2 seats) and Vlaams Belang (2 seats) were in the opposition in the Municipal Council, and together had 11 seats out of 25. The Presiding Officer of the Municipal Council was Werner Mertens (CD&V).

Between 2013 and 2018, the majority consisted of CD&V and OpenVLD, CD&V having attained 12 seats, and OpenVLD 3 seats, forming a majority. NV-A (5 seats), GroenSociaal (2 seats) and anders (a local party, 3 seats) were part of the opposition.

In the elections of October 2018, CD&V stayed the largest party with 10 seats, followed by N-VA (5 seats), Open VLD (3 seats), anders (3 seats), Groen (3 seats) and SP.A (1 seat). CD&V announced a coalition with the second party N-VA to form a majority for the legislative session of 2019 and beyond.

=== College of Mayor and Aldermen ===
The current mayor of Rotselaar is Jelle Wouters (CD&V). His primary responsibilities as mayor include, but are not limited to: security (police, fire service), personnel, communication, festivities, honorary and legal affairs. The mayor is assisted by a number of aldermen, who together form the College of Mayor and Aldermen. Rotselaar is entitled to five aldermen because it has between 10,000 and 19,999 inhabitants.

=== Coat of arms and logo ===
Coat of Arms

Logo

The official coat of arms of the municipality of Rotselaar was adopted by the municipal council in 1968 and ratified by Royal Decree in 1973. After the merger with the municipalities of Werchter and Wezemaal, the coat of arms was confirmed by the municipal council and 1981 and ratified in 1982. The coat of arms consists of three fleur-de-lis gules on a field of silver.

In line with many other municipalities adopting modern fashions, the municipal government decided in 2002 to introduce a new house style with a modern logo replacing the coat of arms in communication and on municipal documents.

This is the meaning of the logo: the keep "Ter Heide" is the symbol for the cultural heritage of Rotselaar, the field tracks symbolise the rural aspects of the municipality and the agriculture, the blue river is the symbol for the three rivers of Rotselaar, the Demer, the Dijle and the Winge, and the lake, the green represents the natural environment and nature reserves of Rotselaar, the plantations and the hills covered with forests, and last but not least, the sun gives Rotselaar blossoming vineyards and refers to the recreational facilities and activities in Rotselaar.

== Education ==
There are 7 primary schools in Rotselaar. There is also a secondary school in Rotselaar, the Montfortcollege, which has a good reputation in the field of education in the region. The Montfortcollege also offers boarding facilities. While many of Rotselaar's youths attend primary schools in Rotselaar itself, most go to secondary schools outside of Rotselaar because the waiting lists for the Montfortcollege are often very long, except for boarding school students. Of the youths who attend secondary schools outside of Rotselaar, most go to school in Leuven. The "Hagelandse Academie voor Beeldende Kunst" (Hageland Academy for Visual Arts) is also located in Rotselaar.

== Places of interest ==
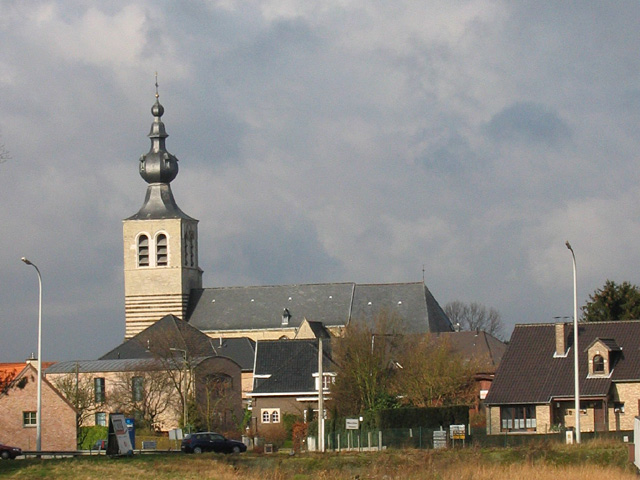
Saint John the Baptist's Church in Werchter

The keep Ter Heide is a unique tower based on a Greek cross floorplan. It was probably built around the year 1350 on order of Gerard vander Heyden, Drossard of Brabant, who rose to the nobility through marriage. The keep, and the moat surrounding it, was meant to stress his prestige. The keep has six floors that are connected by a spiral staircase. The basement floor and the entrance level are roofed with a barrel vault. The tower was built in brick on a whitestone base, which is directly in the water. The construction was embellished with sandstone and ironstone. The keep has been protected as a monument since 3 July 1942 and was thoroughly restored in 1948. The keep "Ter Heide" is no longer open to the public.

The watermill "Van Doren" was first mentioned in the 12th century and was repeatedly expanded and restored since the 16th century. All these phases were preserved, so the building offers and overview of its archaeological and industrial past. The water turbine (1902) has been restored in 1995, since then it generates electricity (70 kW) once more.

The Saint John the Baptist's Church (Sint-Jan-De-Doperkerk) is located in Werchter. It dates back to 1439.

The Saint Peter's Church (Sint-Pieterskerk) is a Neo-Gothic church in the centre of Rotselaar, which was rebuilt in 1846.

A landmark is the building of the former brewery Mena.

== Recreation ==
The Domain Ter Heide is the main recreational domain in Rotselaar. It is also called, in Dutch, "het meer van Rotselaar" or "de Plas van Rotselaar" (the lake of Rotselaar). It is popular among walkers, cyclists and bird-watchers. Fishing is allowed in the fishing zone domain from June 1 to April 15, between sunrise and sunset. But you have to have a public Flemish fishing permit, which is available in the post office.

A variety of other leisure activities are also possible, such as swimming or sunbathing. Outside of the swimming season, the domain's swimming zone is open daily from 08:30 to sunset, but during the swimming season it is open from 10:00 to 20:30. Access to the swimming zone is free for inhabitants of Rotselaar. Others have to pay for entry and swimming is only allowed when lifeguards are present and the green flag is out. The swimming season lasts roughly from the middle of May to the end of August, depending on the weather. The swimming zone is delimited by a ditch and a line of buoys, and swimming is prohibited outside of this zone, among other reasons because there is a surfing zone as well. For reasons of hygiene, dogs are not allowed during the swimming season in the entire domain, however, from September 1 dogs on a leash are allowed in the domain, but not in the swimming zone.

Windsurfing is allowed from the Easter holidays to October 15 in the surfing zone, which is separate from the swimming zone for reasons of safety. Ice skating on natural ice is possible as well, though rarely, but it is strictly forbidden to enter the ice unless the municipal government explicitly allows ice skating. If the municipal government allows ice skating, it will publish so in the local press, the "Dorpskrant" (a local newspaper published by the municipal government) and on the website of Rotselaar. There is also a nature zone in the domain, which is off-limits to the public. Other possible activities include, but are not limited to, squash and beach volleyball.

== Rock Werchter ==
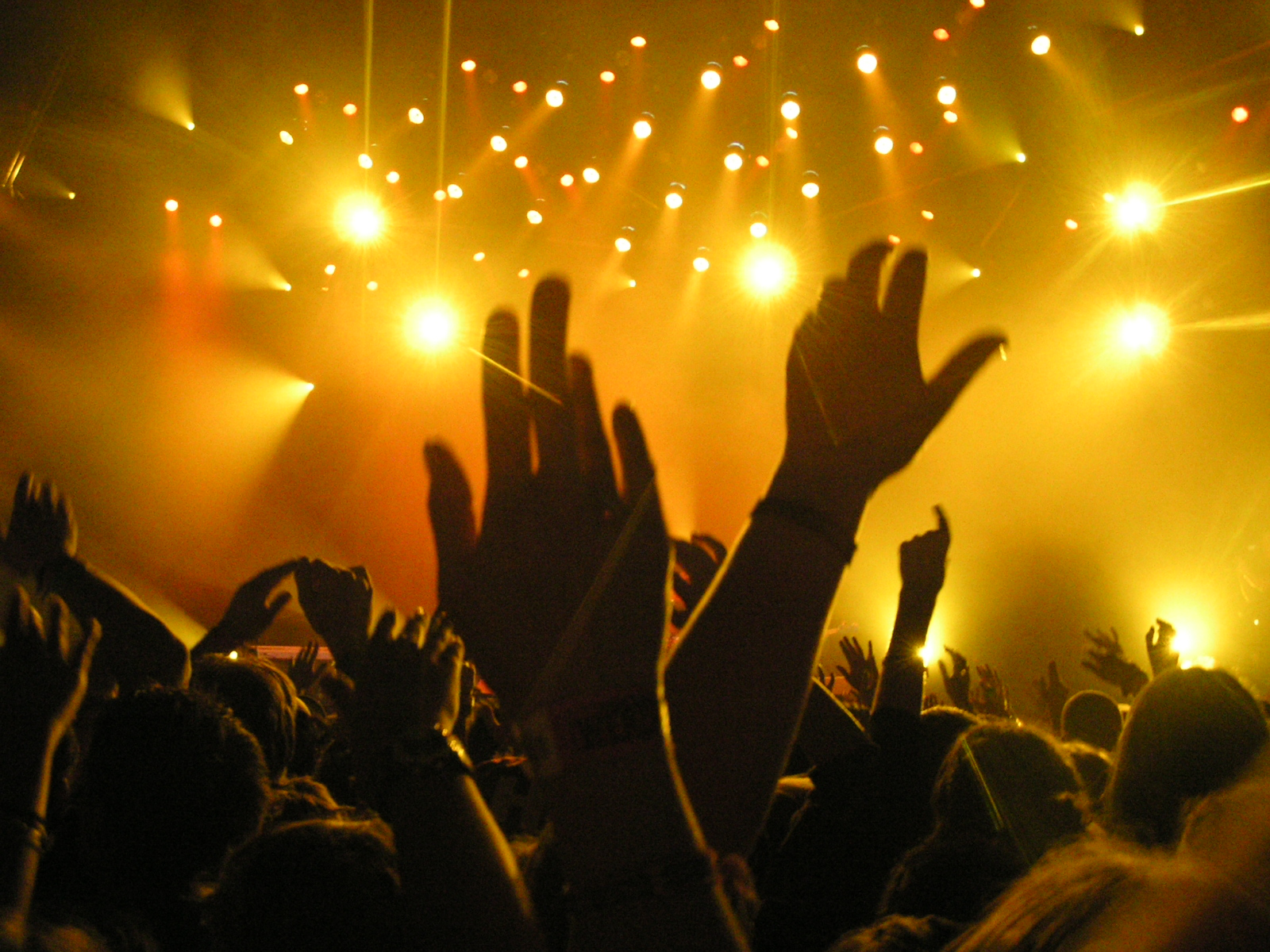
Picture of the Pyramid Marquee at Rock Werchter

Rock Werchter is a music festival held annually during the first weekend of the summer holidays in Werchter. It was first organised in 1974 and since 2003 the festival lasts four days, and the 2003 and 2005 editions won the Arthur award for the best festival in the world of the International Live Music Conference. It's the largest music festival in Belgium and one of the largest festivals in Europe. It's even famous over the Belgian borders. Each year, many renowned groups and artists perform at Rock Werchter, and over 320,000 people come to the festival. Originally it was a double-festival, called "Rock Torhout-Werchter", with two festival areas on different places in Belgium: one in Werchter and one in Torhout. There is also a "Rock Werchterroute", a cycling route, around Werchter and Leuven, which also organises an annual music festival which is among the most popular in Belgium, Marktrock.

== International friendship ==
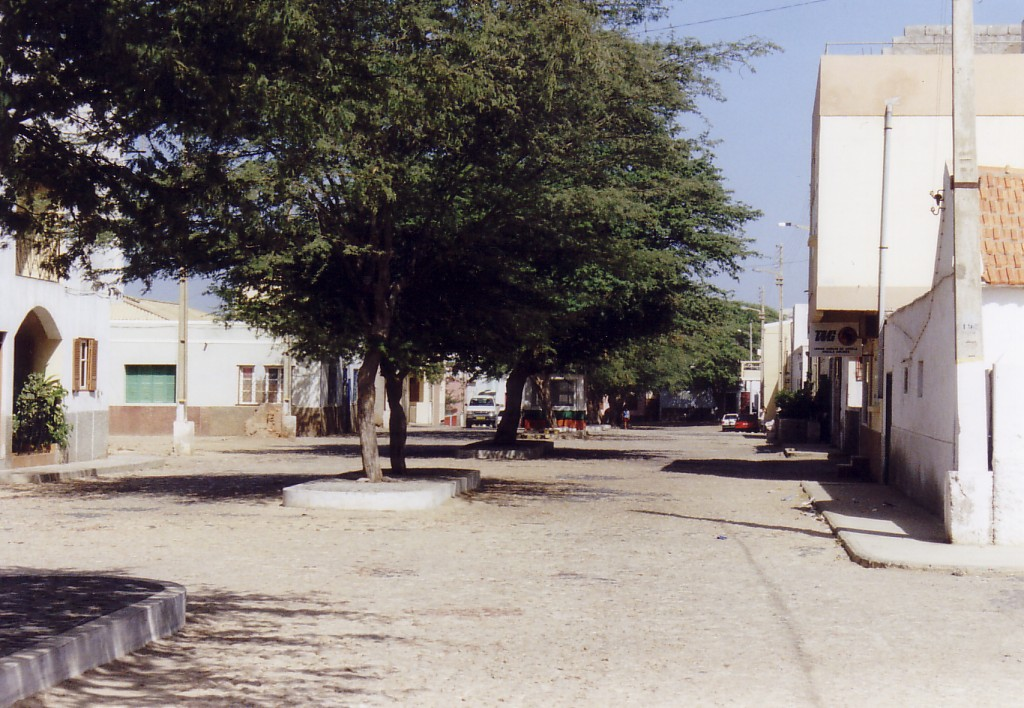
Main street Espargos

Rotselaar maintains sister city relationships with Bad Gandersheim, a city in southern Lower Saxony, Germany, located between Hannover and Kassel, since 1987. In 1990, a town twinning committee was created for the purpose of furthering the ties between Rotselaar and Bad Gandersheim through visits, exhibitions, language courses and other initiatives. An annual town twinning weekend is organised as well, alternately in Rotselaar and Bad Gandersheim.

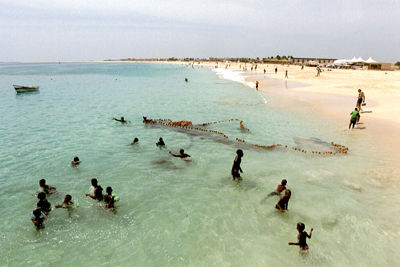
Santa Maria beach

There has been a cooperation project between Rotselaar and Sal, one of the islands in the archipelago of Cape Verde. The island is around 30 km long by 15 km wide, and has roughly the same number of inhabitants as Rotselaar. Sal has 4 habitational centres: Espargos with the main urban and administrative centre and the international airport of Cape Verde, Santa Maria, where tourism and hotels are situated, Pedra de Lume, once the site of salt collection (hence the name of the island, "sal" is Portuguese for "salt"), and Palmeira, a fishing village with a port.

The request for cooperation came from Sal itself. Basilio Ramos, then mayor of Sal, sought to establish a link with a municipality in the vicinity of Leuven. As a former student of the K.U.Leuven he wanted to strengthen the ties with Belgium. This form of cooperation is different from the others. The cooperation with Sal is a form of development cooperation where the accent is on exchange and partnership in the administrative and the professional fields, and in particular on the exchange of experiences in the fields of environment and youth work.

In 1989, the municipal government adopted the Romanian village of Vrânceni, which is a part of Căiuţi in the eastern county of Bacău, as part of the project "AdoptieDorpen Roemenië" (Adoption Villages Romania). The local action committee organises various activities throughout the year, of which the yields go to the adoption village. Among others, a school building was constructed in Vrânceni with the help of Rotselaar.

== Famous persons ==
Famous persons that were born, lived or died in Rotselaar, Wezemaal or Werchter include, but are not limited to:

- Paul Bouts
- Bert Longin
- Jef Scherens
- Hugo Vandenberghe
- Cornelius Van Leemputten

== See also ==
- Werchter
- Rock Werchter
