= Stellingwerff/Theunissen =

Gin distillery in Belgium

Since 1987 the former Stellingwerff/Theunissen Distillery in Witte Nonnenstraat, Hasselt has housed the city's Jenever Museum. The Stellingwerff/Theunissen distillery was located along the Nieuwe Demer, where most of Hasselt's distilleries were located in the 18th century. It bordered Hasselt's beguinage.

== History ==
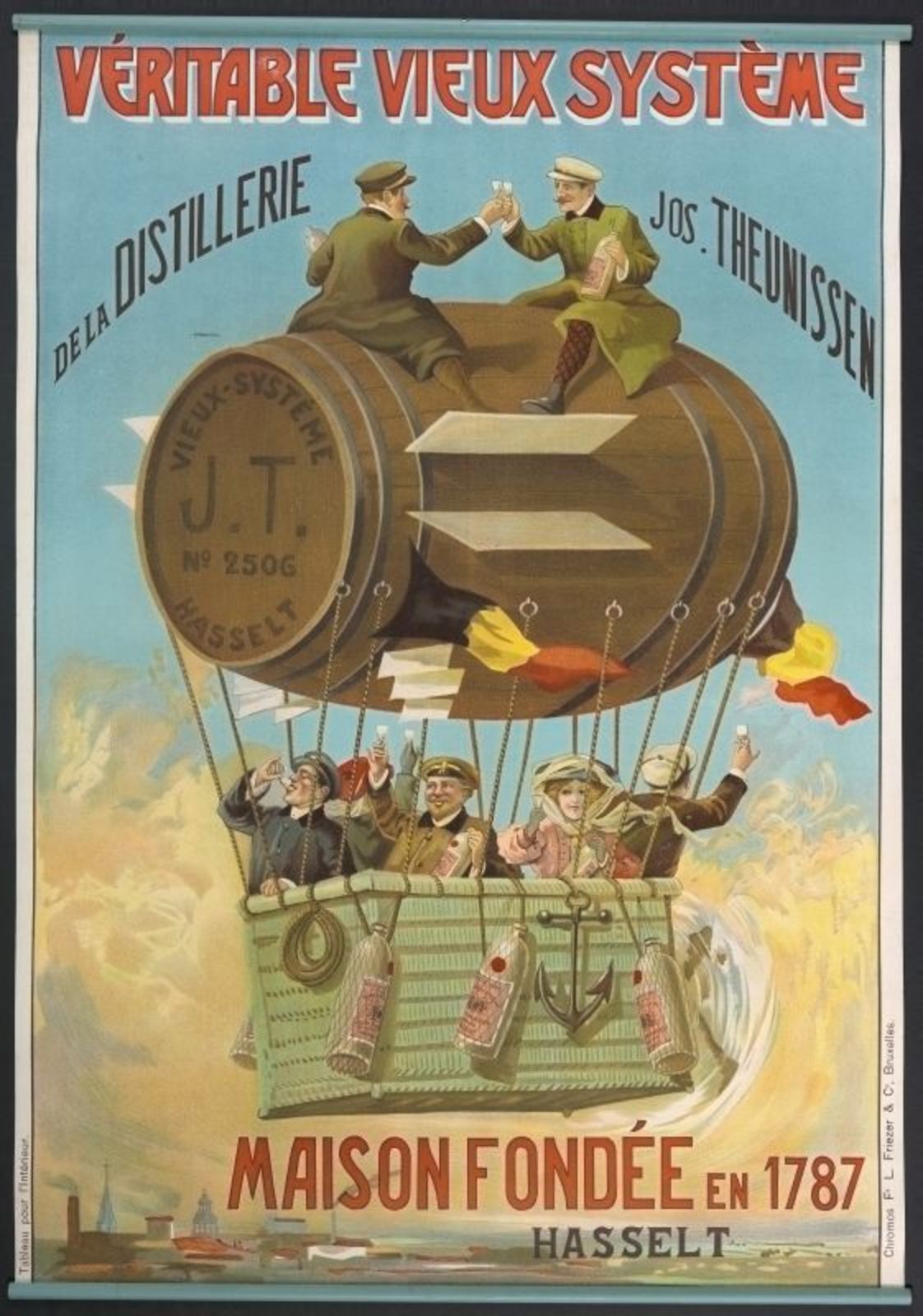
Poster for distillery Theunissen from 1910

Originally, the distillery was a convent farm run by the Sisters of St Francis of Penance – popularly known as the white nuns – whose convent Sint-Catharinadal was on the other side of the street.

=== Stellingwerff ===
During the French occupation, monastic properties were confiscated and sold. In 1803, Jean Antoine Séraphin Bamps (1776-1842) bought the convent farm and set up a jenever distillery. A few years later, in 1807, he sold the farm and its distillery to tobacco manufacturer and trader Leo Vaesen, who operated the distillery until his death in 1822.

When Leo Vaesen died, the distillery passed – via his sister Maria-Catherina Vaesen, widow of Guillaume Joseph Stellingwerff (1763-1814) – to the Stellingwerff family. Maria-Catherina lived there with her priest brother Nicolaas Gerard. They carried out a number of important renovation works: the distillery wing, for instance, was given an extra floor and an attic and converted into a house.

After Maria-Catherina's death in 1843, her son Adam Nicolaas Leon Stellingwerff (1798-1876) inherited the distillery. He ran it together with his brother Leon Joseph Victor (1805-1888). In 1850, the distillery was given its current appearance: a Neoclassical façade with a central gate.

Following Adam's death in 1876, Leon Joseph Victor continued the distillery, together with his cousins Victor Guillaume Gustave and Leon Hubert Joseph. When Leon Joseph Victor died in 1890, the two cousins sold the distillery to Godfried Vanrusselt and Paul Jozef Theunissen.

=== Theunissen ===
In 1891 Godfried Vanrusselt sold his shares to Jean Leonard Brauns, who partnered with Paul Jozef Theunissen until 1904, after which Theunissen continued alone. In 1912, one of the livestock sheds was converted into a liqueur factory. When Paul Jozef Theunissen died in 1927, he was succeeded by his sons Léon and Joseph Theunissen.

The distillery produced grain alcohol until World War II. After the war, until around 1965, it produced liqueurs on a limited scale. In the 1970s the buildings fell into an increasing state of disrepair.

== Jenever Museum ==
On 21 August, 1975 the buildings of the former Stellingwerff/Theunissen distillery were protected by royal decree as Flanders’ first industrial-archaeological monument. A few years later, in 1979, Hasselt city council bought them with the intention of housing a museum there. The restoration work – funded by European, provincial and government grants – started in the spring of 1983 and was completed in July 1987. The museum opened its doors on 16 September of that same year.
