= Hageland =

The Hageland is a landscape in the Flemish Region of Belgium, situated in the eastern part of the Province of Flemish Brabant. It is mainly comprised between the cities of Aarschot, Leuven, Tienen and Diest, and probably coincides to some extent with the twelfth-century County of Leuven. The French Government that controlled the area that later became Belgium in the last years of the 18th and early 19th century, had extended Limburg, which since then comprises the minor part of the Hageland at the city of Halen.

The name refers to land with dense (low) forest and/or undergrowth. Its earliest attestation (spelled as Hagelant) dates from 1528.

== Geography ==
The area is a series of east–west–directed ridges of ironstone hills. The ridge that includes the 106-metre-high Molenberg hill at the village of Pellenberg forms the southern border of the Hageland, and the Velp, a tributary of the Demer, limits its southeast.

Touristic publications of Hageland often erroneously include a landscape of Flemish Brabant that lies to the south-east of it, which geophysically rather belongs to the drylands (Tienen, Hoegaarden, Landen) and wetlands (Zoutleeuw) region of Hesbaye (in Dutch Haspengouw). This led to an informal name of South Hageland distinct from North Hageland (Hageland proper).

Another tributary, the Gete, is the eastern and the river Demer itself the northern border of Hageland.

== See also ==
- Schleswig-Holstein Uplands
- Hügelland
