= Saint Leonard's Church, Zoutleeuw =

Saint Leonard's Church
- Dutch: Sint-Leonarduskerk
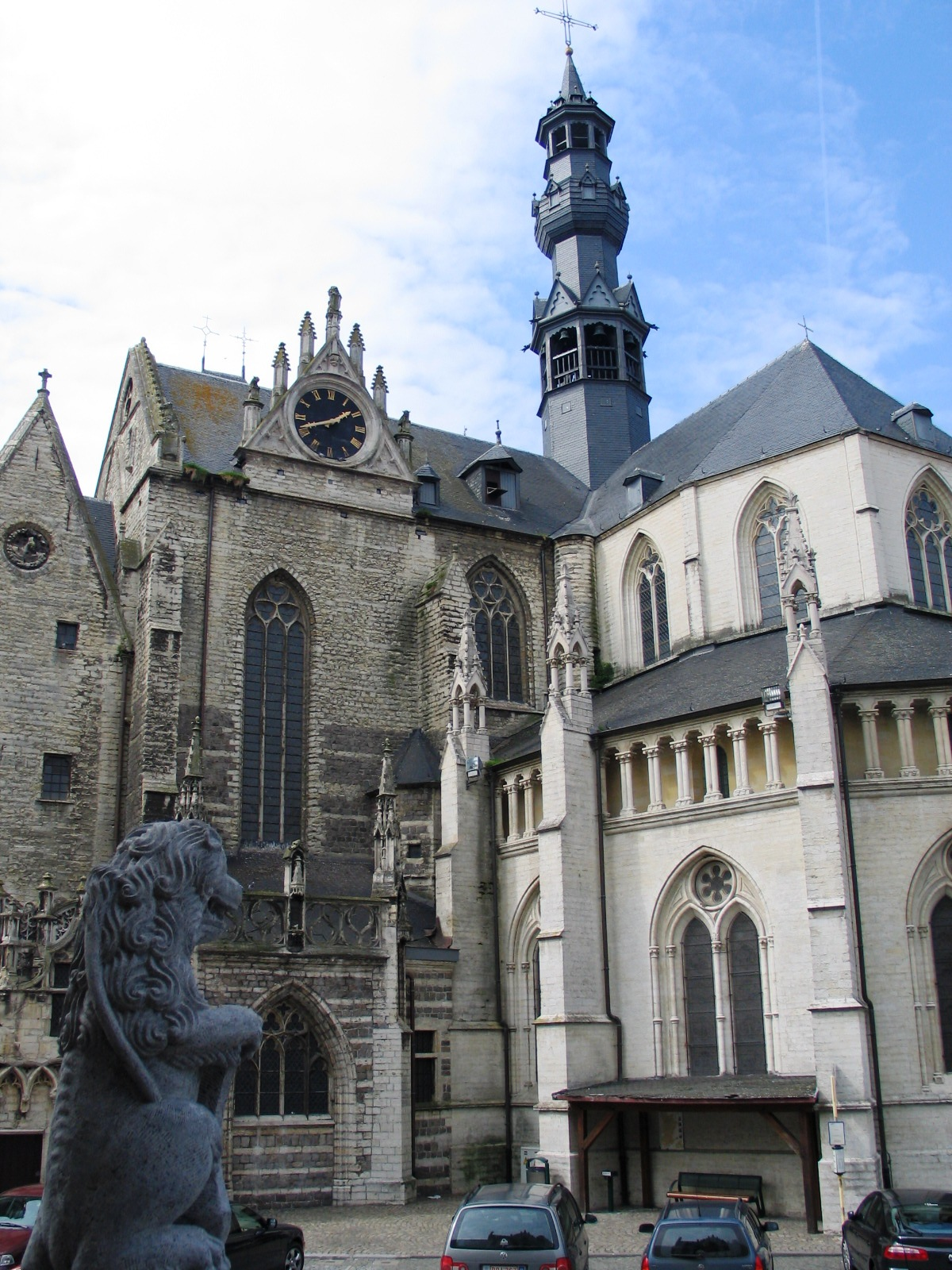
- Saint Leonard's Church
- Location: Zoutleeuw
- Country: Belgium
- Denomination: Roman Catholic

History
- Founded: 1125

Architecture
- Heritage designation: Monument
- Style: Gothic
- Location within Belgium

UNESCO World Heritage Site
- Official name: Sint-Leonarduskerk
- Part of: Belfries of Belgium and France
- Criteria: Cultural: (ii), (iv)
- Reference: 943bis-026
- Inscription: 1999 (23rd Session)
- Extensions: 2005
- Area: 0.2 ha (0.49 acres)
- Buffer zone: 35.25 ha (87.1 acres)
- Website: www.zoutleeuw.be/website/12-www/65-www/122-www.html
- Coordinates: 50°50′00″N 5°06′11″E

Saint Leonard's Church (Dutch: Sint-Leonarduskerk) is a Roman Catholic church in Zoutleeuw, Belgium. It stands on the former site of a Romanesque chapel erected in 1125 by Benedictines from Vlierbeek Abbey near Leuven. Construction of the present church began around 1231, and additions continued into the 16th century. Rendered mainly in the Gothic style, the building in its oldest parts shows traces of the Romanesque architectural style.

The two heavy square towers flanking the west facade are connected with each other by means of a gallery over the nave. The slender central tower, octagonal in cross-section, contains a carillon with 24 bells. In 1999, UNESCO included the towers and church as part of the World Heritage Site Belfries of Belgium and France.

Few, if any other medieval churches in Belgium remain in such an excellent state of preservation as Saint Leonard's, which stayed clear of the widespread iconoclasm during the Protestant Reformation. It also survived the French Revolution intact, because three canons took an oath of allegiance to the French regime. The interior thus offers an authentic glimpse of how the churches of Brabant were furnished centuries ago.

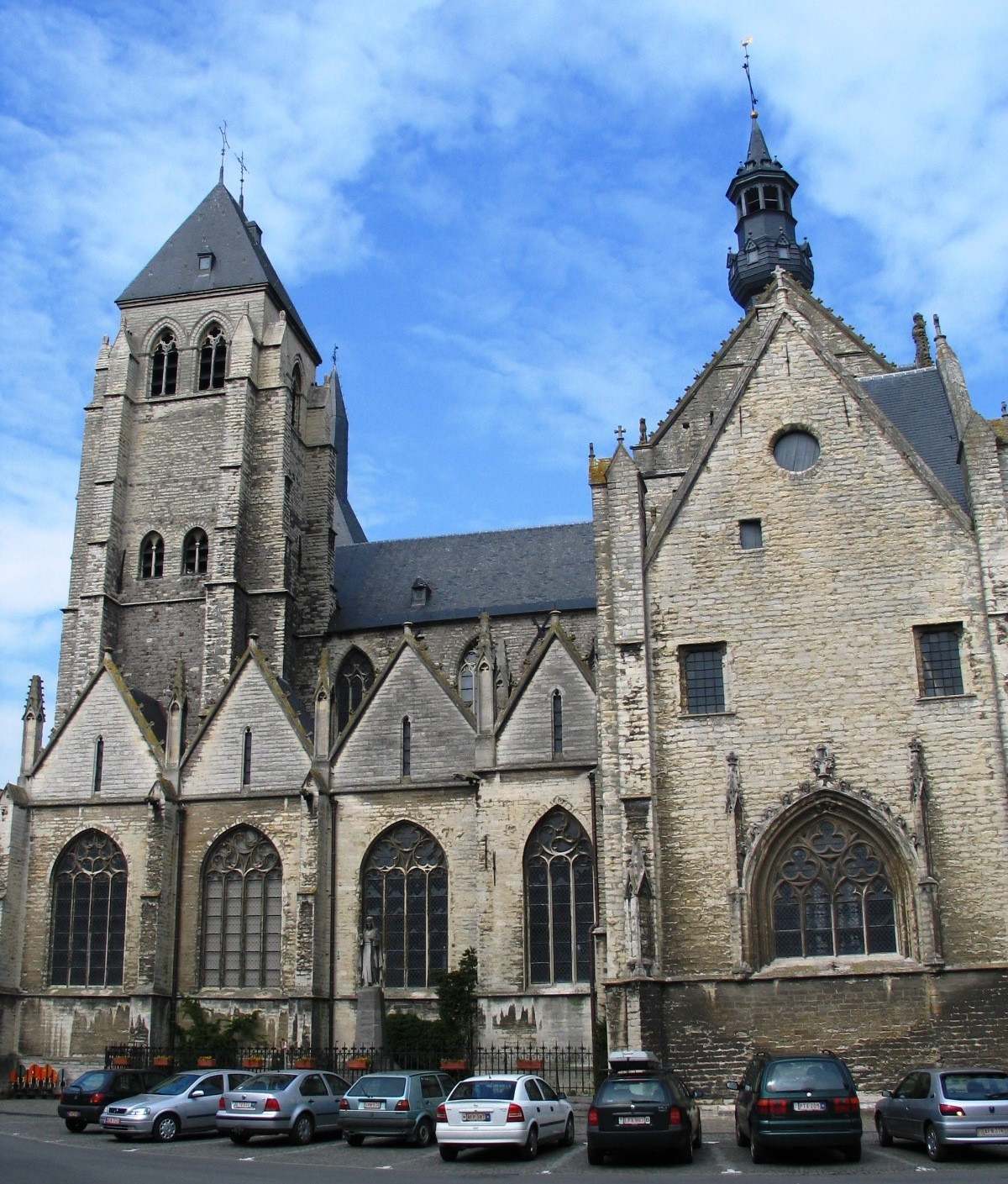
Lateral view

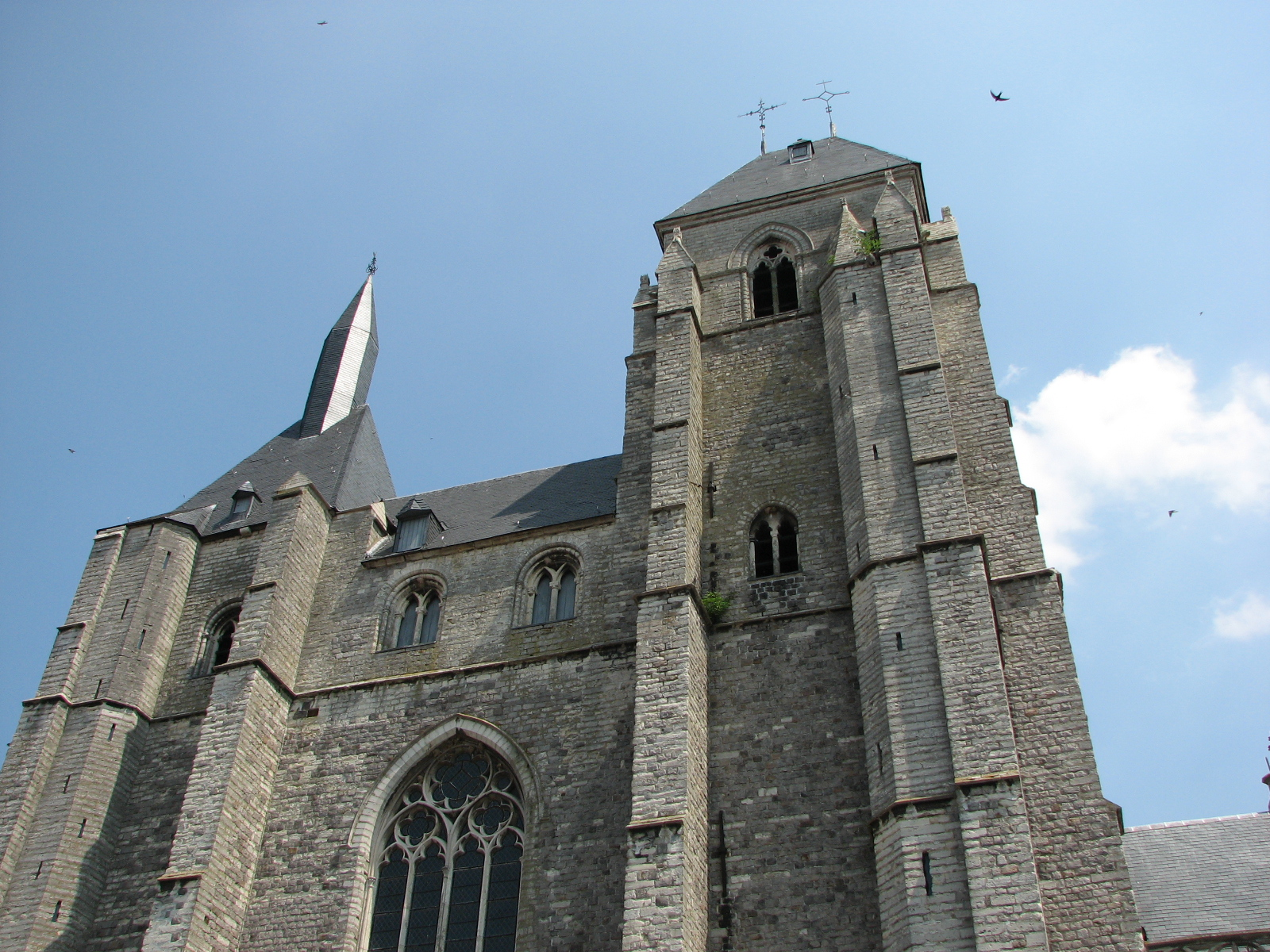
West front

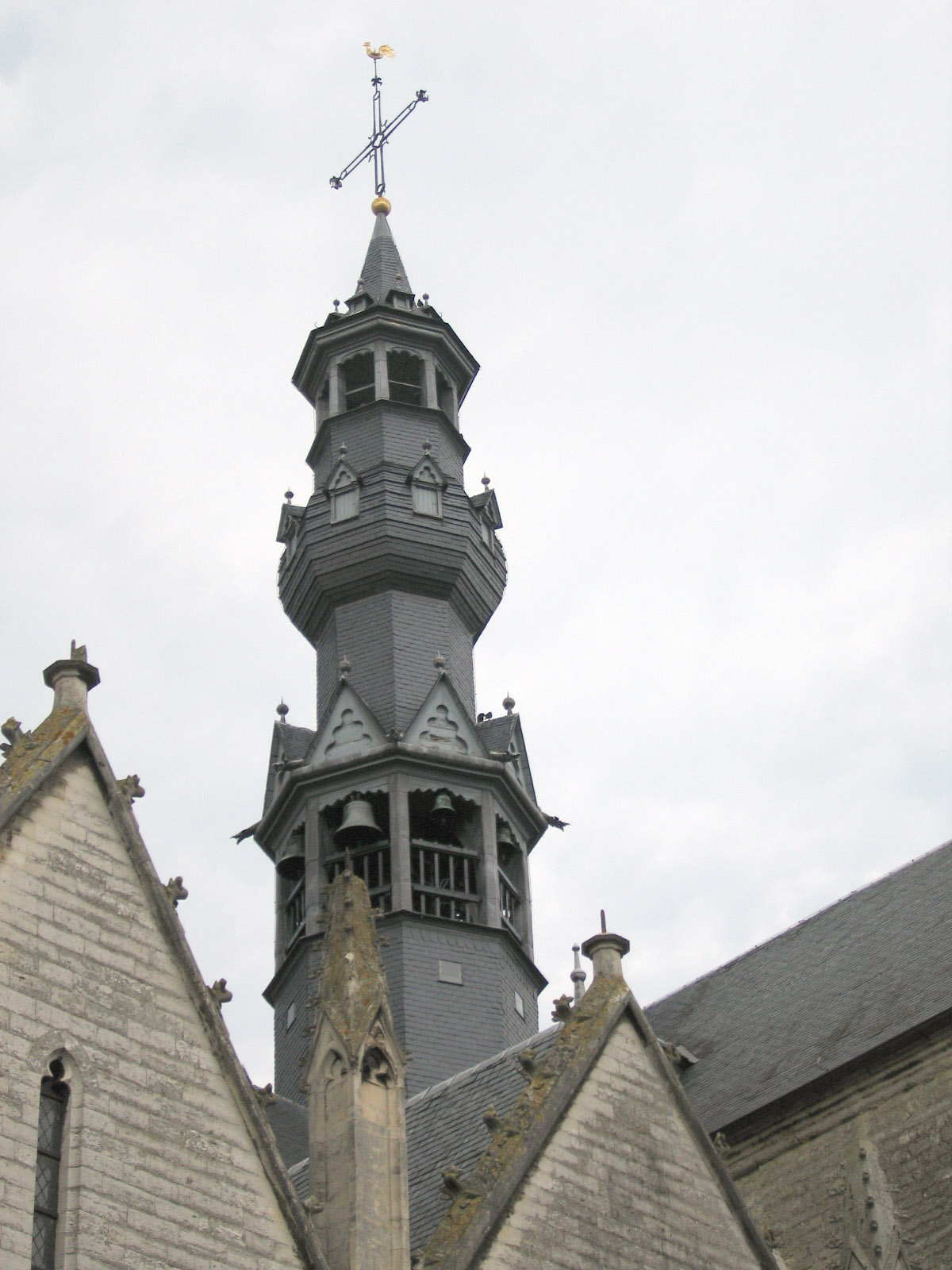
Central tower

== Art relics ==
- a tabernacle in the form of an 18-meter-high, nine-level tower, built in 1552 by Cornelis Floris de Vriendt. This tower of white Avesnes stone was shipped to the church in components, from de Vriendt's workshop in Antwerp. A copy of this tabernacle is kept in the Victoria and Albert Museum in London.
- the Marianum, a painted double-sided sculpture of the Virgin Mary, from the 16th century.
- a Virgin Mary icon from 1250.
- a six-meter-high brass candelabra from 1483.
- icons of Saint Leonard of Noblac (the church's eponymous patron saint) from 1300 and 1505.
- the St. Leonard retable from 1478.
- a wooden pietà from the 15th century.
- a Romanesque crucifix from the 11th century.
- a brass lectern with eagle sculpture.
- a Renaissance retable of Saint Anne, from the 16th century.

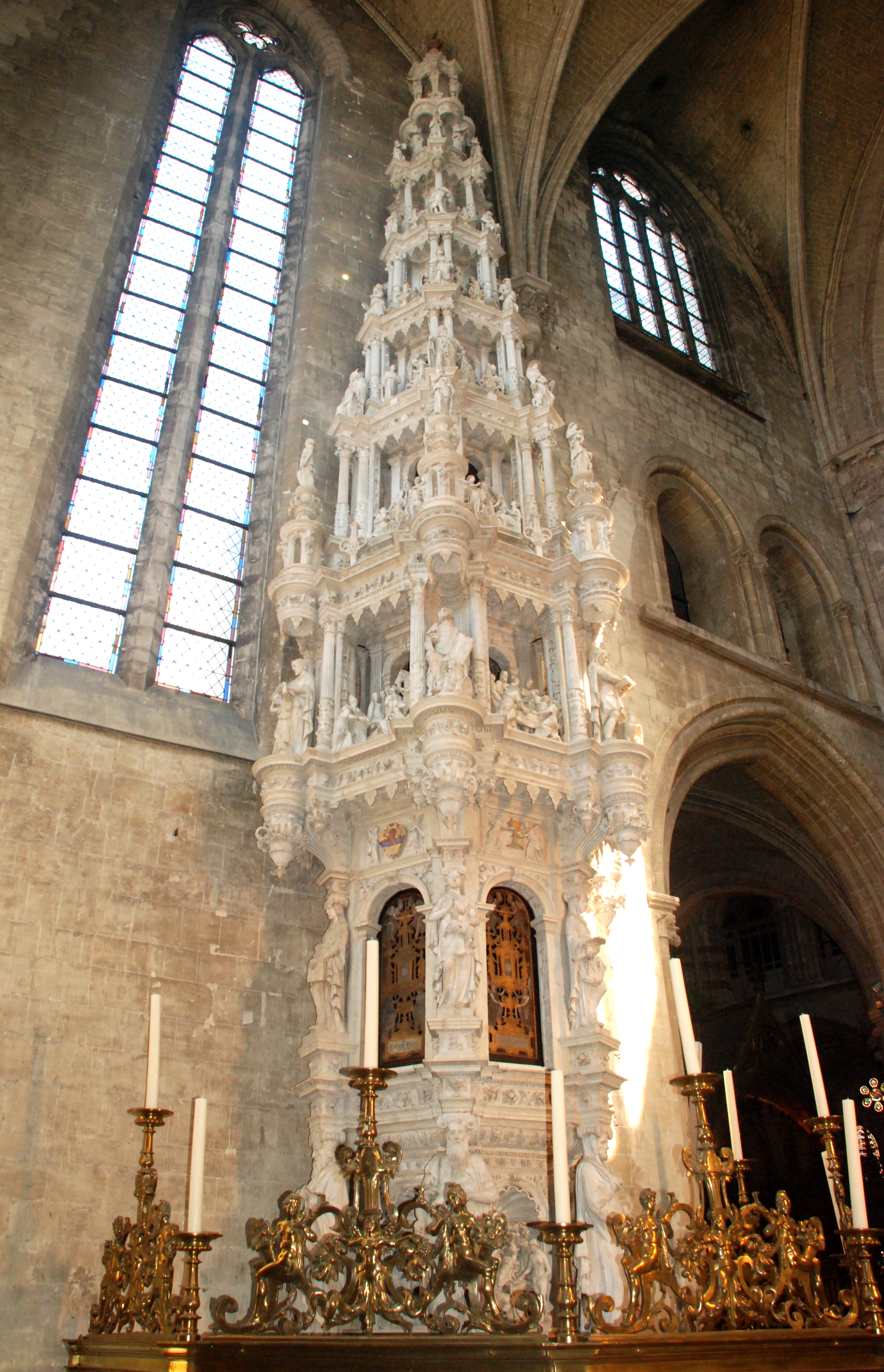
Tabernacle

== See also ==
- List of carillons in Belgium
