= Halle-Booienhoven =

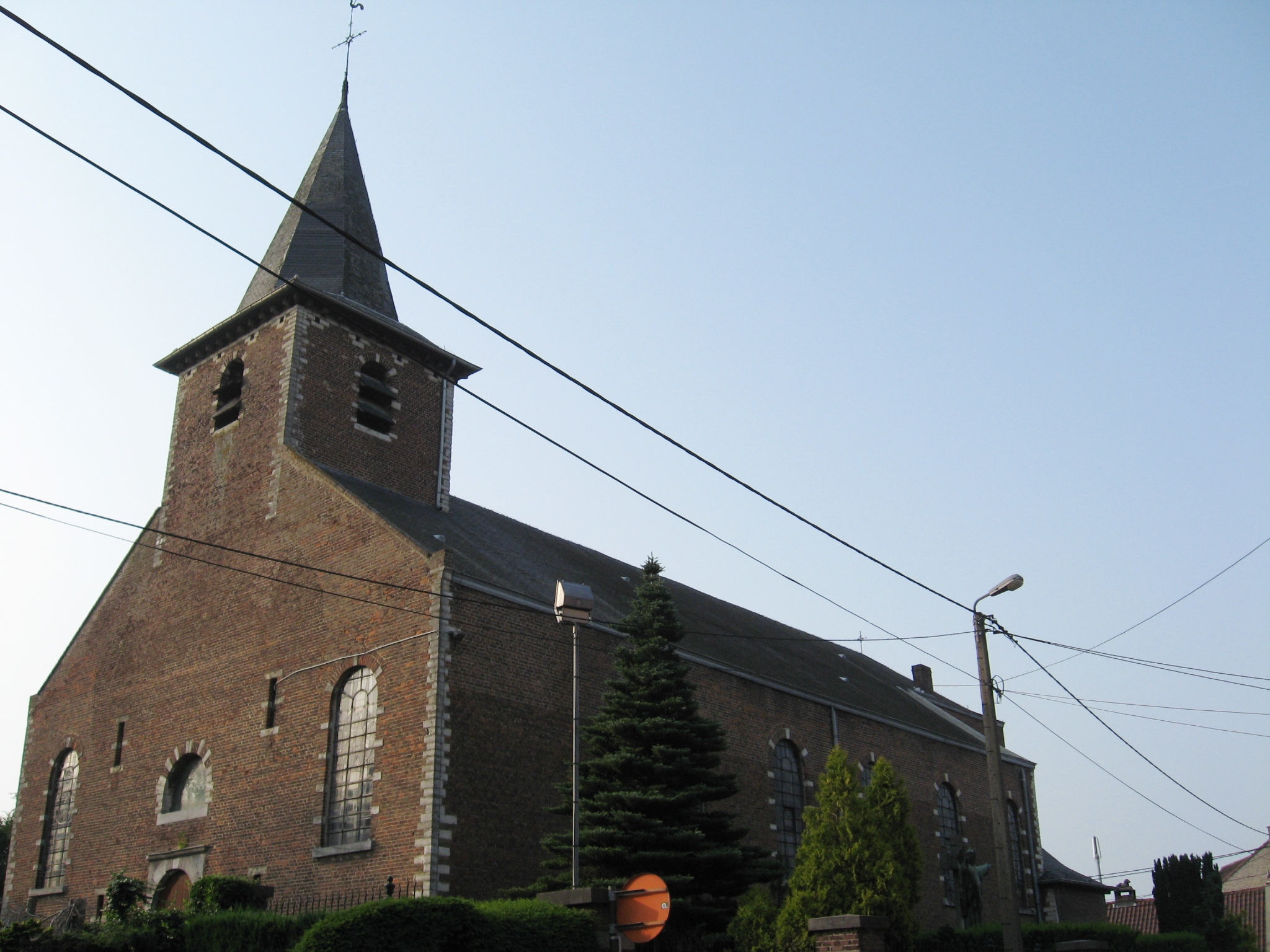
- Church of Saint Bartholomew in Halle

- Location in Belgium
- Country: Belgium
- Region: Flanders
- Community: Flemish Community
- Province: Flemish Brabant
- Arrondissement: Leuven
- Municipality: Zoutleeuw
- Postal codes: 3440
- Area codes: 011

Halle-Booienhoven is a section of the municipality of Zoutleeuw, in the province of Flemish Brabant, Belgium. It was a municipality in its own right before the merger of the municipalities in 1977.

== Etymology ==
- Halle – Old forms: circa 1050 Hala, 1107 Halle, 1139 Hallo. It comes from the Germanic word halha, which means "bend in the highland". A series of hilltops are lined up from Velm to Halle-Bisjeshoven. Between the peaks with a height of 83.75 and 80 meters is an outcrop, after which Halle was named.
- Booienhoven – Old forms: 1235 boedenhoeven, 1350 boedenhouen (read: -hoven), 1357 in bodenhouen (read: -hoven), etc. and with expulsion of d Boijenhouen in 1645. Booihoven, like Goetshoven and Gussenhoven, belongs to a younger layer of settlement names that originated between 600 and 700 AD. The type consists of a person's name in the Romanesque genitive singular + curtem, meaning "court, farm" of the named person. Following this the type was created: personal name in the Germanic genitive singular + hofum, singular of hofa, which means "farm". We can thus reconstruct Booihoven as Germanic *Budon hofum, meaning "Budo's farm".
