= Winter brook (Beringen) =

Winter brook in Belgium

Winter brook Genemeerbeek, Kleine beek, Grote beek, Zwart Water, Hulpe
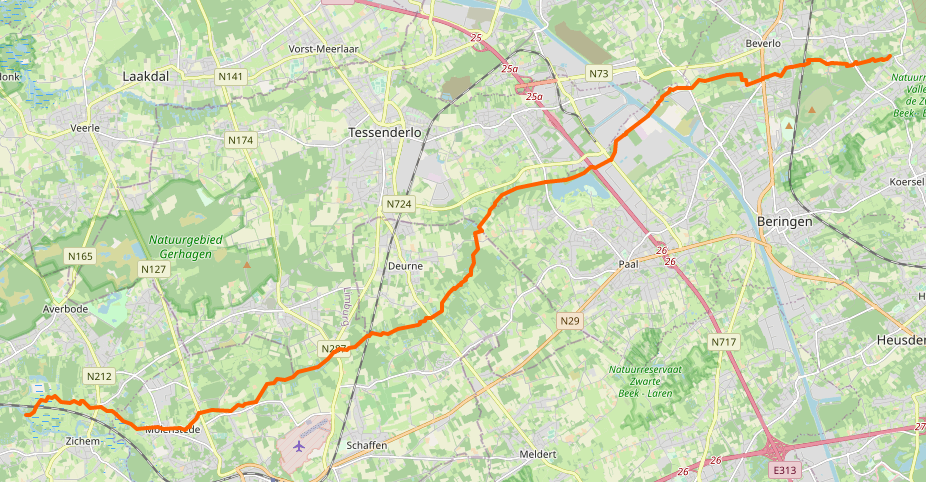

Location
- Country: Belgium

Physical characteristics
- Source: Beringen (Limburg)
  - location: Beringen, Belgium
  - elevation: 57.5m
- Mouth: Demer (river)
  - location: Scherpenheuvel-Zichem, Belgium
  - coordinates: 51°5′15.06″N 5°15′51.28″E
  - elevation: 17 m (56 ft)
- Length: 35 km (22 mi)
- Basin size: 85,44 km²
- Discharge
  - maximum: 0,896 m³/s

The Winter brook (Dutch: Winterbeek) is the mainstream in a network of partially excavated stream beds in Belgium in the Southern Campine region. The Winter brook originates in Beverlo (a district of Beringen), and, after a course of 32 km, it flows into the Demer River in Scherpenheuvel-Zichem. Along this course, the stream changes names multiple times.

It is a tributary of the Demer River. The basin spans over 85 km^{2}, and the stream is over 32 kilometers long. The Winter brook flows through the natural area Vallei van de Drie Beken south of the village Deurne. The source area is on the Campine region, at 57.5 m elevation. The confluence with the Demer River is at 17 m elevation.

It should not be confused with the Winter brook in Beverst or the slightly more southerly flowing Winter brook in Koersel and Beringen Center, which flows into the Zwarte Beek to the west of Beringen.

== Watercourse with various names ==
The naming system of the streams that form the stream system is complex. The Winter brook is the general name of the main watercourse. Near its source, it was referred to as the Genemeer brooks(Dutch: Genemeerbeek), and also Small brook(Dutch: Kleine Beek). From Paal, it is named Winter brook. Once across the provincial border in Flemish Brabant, it is called Big brook (Dutch: Grote Beek) until the side stream Small brook enters that Big brook; at that point, the name changes to Black Water (Dutch:Zwart Water). When the side stream Hulpe joins it, it takes on the name of that stream and continues as the Hulpe until it flows into the Demer River.

== Watershed ==
The watershed of what is just called the Winter brook encompasses entirely the watershed of the Winter brook, Big brook, Black Water, and Hulpe. The source area of the Winter brook is in Korspel, a hamlet of Beringen. In the downstream direction to the west, three streams combine to contribute to the flow of the Winter brook, among them the Genemeer brook. As a result of mine subsidence, the water management in this source area was disturbed, leading to the reversal of the flow direction of the Genemeer brook, which ceased to join the Winter brook. As a result, a new connection was established from the source area of this stream to Winter brook. Between the villages of Beverlo and Beringen Mine, the brook flows westward, guided through a siphon under the Albert Canal. It now continues southwestward, passing to the north of the Paalse Lake and southeast of Tessenderlo and Deurne. Until this stage, it falls within the classification as a second-class non-navigable watercourse. Near the Paalse Lake, it becomes a watercourse of the first category due to high pollution. Further downstream, Small brook and Middle brook (Dutch:Middelbeek) run parallel to the Winter brook, and the name changes to Big brook. The valley with these parallel running streams is known as the Valley of the Three Brooks. The brook flows south of Deurne, along the area of Asdonk. When the Small brook merges into the Big brook, the name changes to Black Water. This name is given to the dark color that the water acquires due to the presence of peat soil. Beyond Molenstede, there is another name change, and the brook becomes the Hulpe, named after a significant side stream that joins it. Under the name Hulpe, it flows through the Demer Marshes before finally joining the Demer River.

In the western part of the watershed, the valley is flanked by escarpments composed of iron sandstone. These escarpments are up to 30 meters higher than their surroundings.

== Pollution ==
The Winter brook is one of the most polluted rivers in Flanders. For decades, the Tessenderlo Chemie company in Ham discharged water with a high concentration of chloride into the Big ditch (Dutch: Grote Laak), tributary of the Grote Nete and the Winter brook.

It had been known since at least the 1970s that Tessenderlo Chemie was discharging wastewater into the Big ditch and the Winter brook. To dispose of the high-salinity wastewater from Tessenderlo Chemie, the Limburg-Antwerp smear pipe was built in the 1970s. The discharge into the Big ditch and Winter brook had turned those streams into brackish water rivers. However, the discharge pipe was never used for wastewater, and the discharges continued for a long time. In the 1990s, efforts were made to limit releases so that they fell below standards. However, this did not happen: however, "optimal" treatment of the discharge water would not be economically viable and the discharges continued until 2014. A 2003 report by the Flemish Environmental Administration reported chloride concentrations up to nearly 6000 mg/l, where the standard for surface water was 200 mg chlorides per liter. Historical contamination with heavy metals such as arsenic, barium, cadmium, and radium was also found in the water bottom and banks. Consequently, people declared the stream "biologically dead": "Neither fauna nor flora is found in the watercourse."

The owners of polluted plots were exempted by the public Flemish Waste Society (Dutch: Openbare Vlaamse Afvalstoffenmaatschappij) (OVAM) from the obligation to clean up since this was historical pollution from Tessenderlo Chemie. Since Tessenderlo Chemie continued to discharge, starting a soil cleanup did not make sense. For a long time, it was also unclear whether the company would be required to pay for remediation costs. In principle, it would, but this would "not be feasible," according to the then-mayor of Laakdal.

Since 2014, Tessenderlo Chemie has been working with OVAM to remediate the Winter Brook. In March 2017, Tessenderlo Chemie, OVAM, and the Flemish Environmental Society (Dutch: Vlaamse Milieumaatschappij) (VMM) started the remediation work; the aim was to have it completed by 2021. By 2023, the time had come, and a strong reduction of most of the pollutants in soil and water could be observed after the remediation. Positive ecological effects could not yet be found everywhere in the stream in that year.

== Publications ==
- Haskoning Belgium: The Winter Brook Computer modeling as method, flood management as goal; Aminal 2002
- Winter Brook towards ecological restoration of watercourse and valley, Ministry of the Flemish Community: Department of Water, 2003
- A new future for Winter Brook; Flemish Environmental Society / OVAM, 2016
