= Zoutleeuw =

- City and municipality
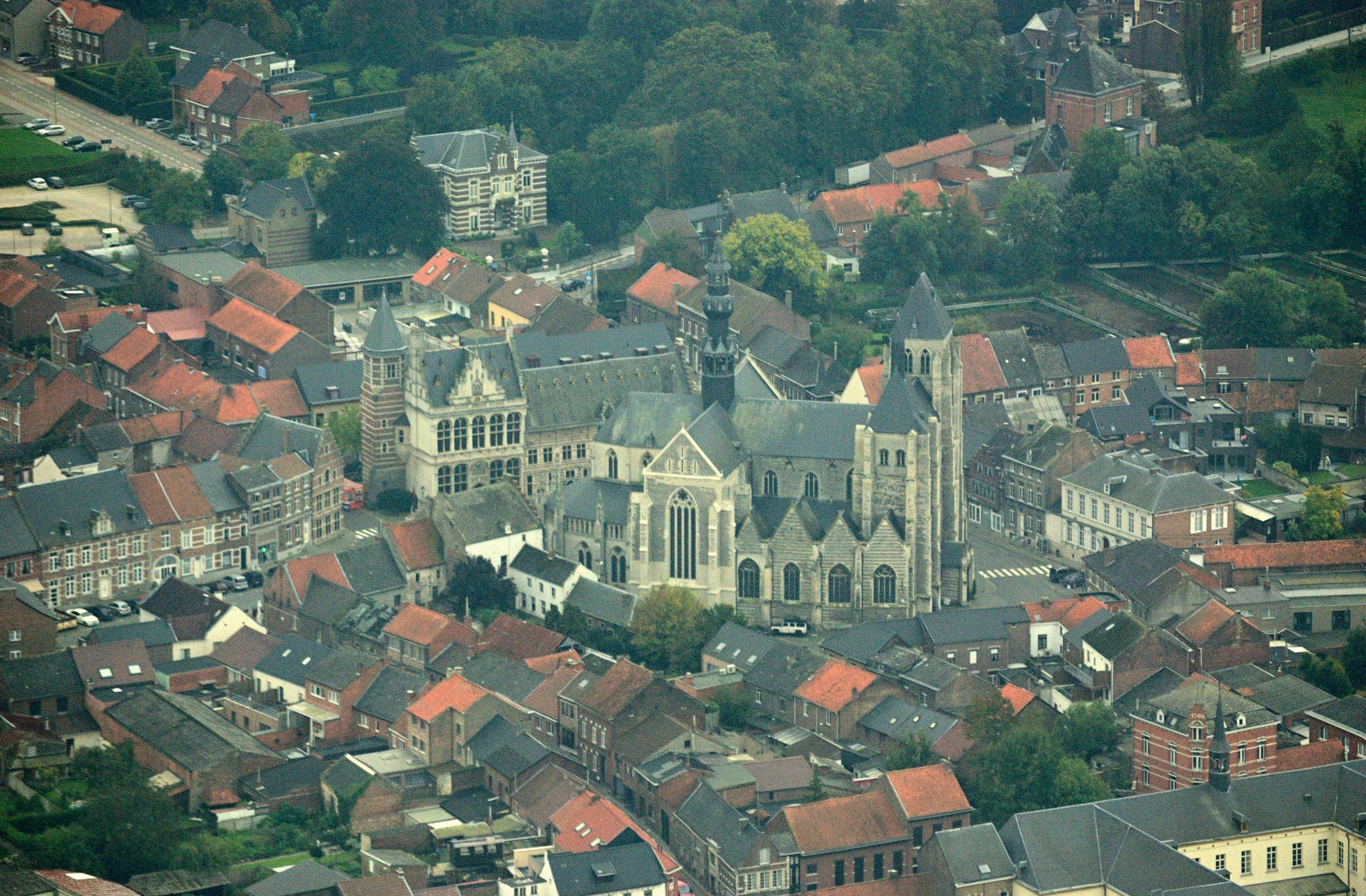

- Flag Coat of arms

- Location of Zoutleeuw in Flemish Brabant
- Interactive map of Zoutleeuw
- Location in Belgium
- Coordinates: 50°50′N 05°06′E
- Country: Belgium
- Community: Flemish Community
- Region: Flemish Region
- Province: Flemish Brabant
- Arrondissement: Leuven

Government
  - Mayor: Boudewijn Herbots (CD&V)
  - Governing party: CD&V

Area
  - Total: 46.85 km^{2} (18.09 sq mi)

Population (2018-01-01)
  - Total: 8,498
  - Density: 181.4/km^{2} (469.8/sq mi)
- Postal codes: 3440
- NIS code: 24130
- Area codes: 011
- Website: www.zoutleeuw.be

Zoutleeuw (Dutch: [zʌutˈleːu]; French: Léau [leo]) is a municipality and city in the Hageland, in the extreme east of the Belgian province of Flemish Brabant. On 1 January 2018 the municipality had 8,498 inhabitants. The total area is 46.73 km^{2}, giving a population density of 182 inhabitants per km^{2}.

The name Leeuw means "lion", to which Zout ("salt") was added from the 16th century in recognition of the town's right to levy a salt tax.

In 1999, UNESCO included the historical St. Leonard's Church as part of the World Heritage Site Belfries of Belgium and France.

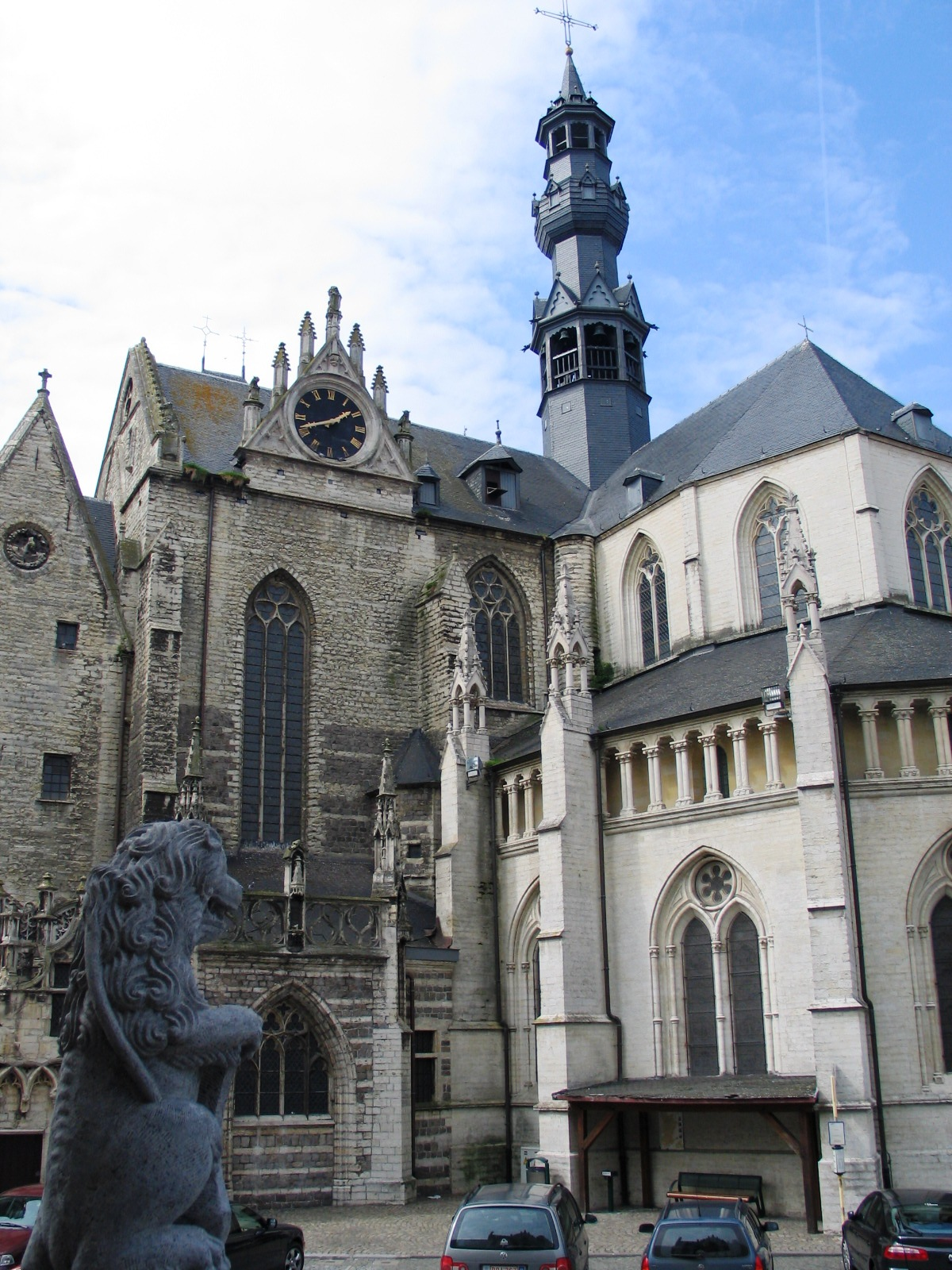
St. Leonard's Church, Zoutleeuw

== Other centres ==
As well as Zoutleeuw proper, the municipality also comprises the sub-municipalities of:

- Budingen
- Dormaal
- Halle-Booienhoven
- Helen-Bos
- Ossenweg
