= Léon de Witte de Haelen =

Belgian Army general (1857–1933)

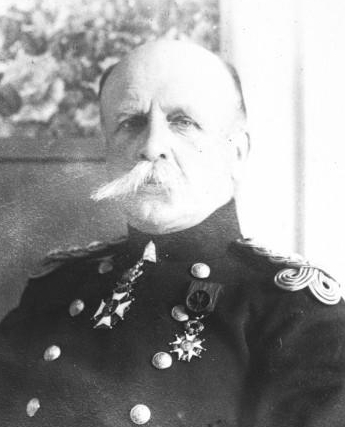
- Léon de Witte in 1915.
- Born: January 12, 1857; Ixelles, Brussels, Belgium
- Died: July 15, 1933 (aged 76); Meer, Belgium
- Military career
- Allegiance: Belgium
- Branch: Cavalry
- Conflicts: World War I; Battle of Haelen

Baron Léon Alphonse Ernest Bruno de Witte de Haelen, born Léon de Witte (12 January 1857 – 15 July 1933) was a Belgian army officer and general who served during World War I. He is particularly known for commanding the Belgian Cavalry Division at the Battle of Haelen in 1914.

== Military career ==
De Witte entered the Royal Military Academy in 1874. He was promoted to sous-lieutenant in 1878. In 1880, he requested a transfer to the cavalry and was posted to the 2nd Chasseurs à Cheval. He received his Brevet d'état-major (BEM) in 1887, and between 1906 and 1910 served as commander of the 1st Guides Regiment.

He held command of the 2nd Cavalry Brigade between 1910 and 1913 and was in command of the newly created cavalry division when Belgium was invaded by Germany in 1914. He was promoted to lieutenant-general in August 1914, just 6 days before commanding his division at the Battle of Haelen. The Belgian victory at the battle, nicknamed the "Battle of the Silver Helmets" after the cavalry helmets left on the battlefield after the fighting, was an important incident of the campaign.

In 1915, he was named inspector-general of the cavalry, which he held until 1919.

== Honours ==
- Belgium: Grand Cordon Order of Leopold, RD 1924.
- Belgium: Grand Officer Order of the Crown
- Belgium: War Cross
- Royal Order of the Sword, Sweden
- Croix de guerre 1914–1918 (France)
- Grand officer Military Order of the Bath, UK
- Jubilee medal HM George V
