= Gete =

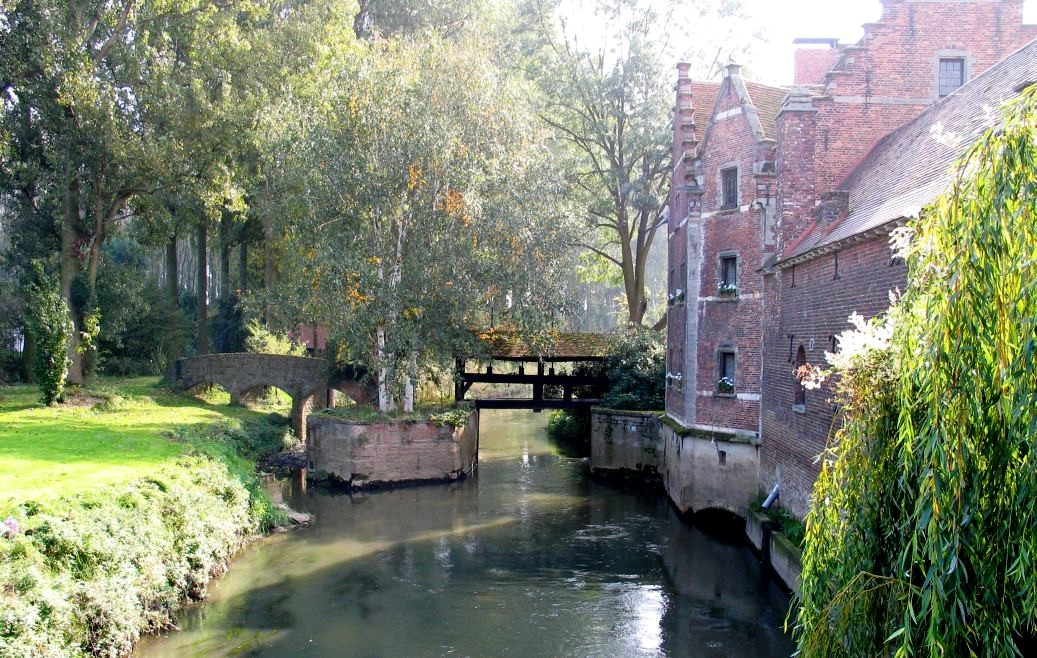
- The Gete in Halen

Location
- Country: Belgium

Physical characteristics
- Mouth: Demer
  - coordinates: 50°57′31″N 5°06′50″E
- Length: 12 km

Basin features
- Progression: Demer→ Dyle→ Rupel→ Scheldt→ North Sea

The Gete (Dutch pronunciation: [ˈɣeːtə]; French: Gette) is a river in Belgium which flows south to north. It is a left tributary of the Demer.

The Gete is formed by the confluence of the rivers Grote Gete ("Large Gete") and Kleine Gete ("Small Gete") near Budingen. From Budingen the river continues for 12 kilometres (7.5 mi) to the city of Halen, where it flows into the Demer. The river was the historical border between the Prince-Bishopric of Liège and the Duchy of Brabant.

The source of the Grote Gete is situated in the village of Perwez. The length of the river to Budingen is 51 kilometres (32 mi). The river flows through Jodoigne, Hoegaarden and Tienen.

The source of the Kleine Gete is in the village of Ramillies. It flows through Orp-Jauche, Hélécine and Zoutleeuw.
