= Demer =

River in eastern Belgium

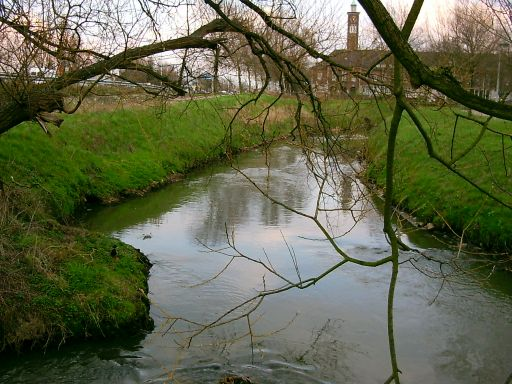
- The Demer in Hasselt

Location
- Country: Belgium

Physical characteristics
- Source
  - location: Limburg, Belgium
- Mouth
  - location: Dyle
  - coordinates: 50.9686°N 4.6927°E
- Length: 85 km (53 mi)

Basin features
- Progression: Dyle→ Rupel→ Scheldt→ North Sea

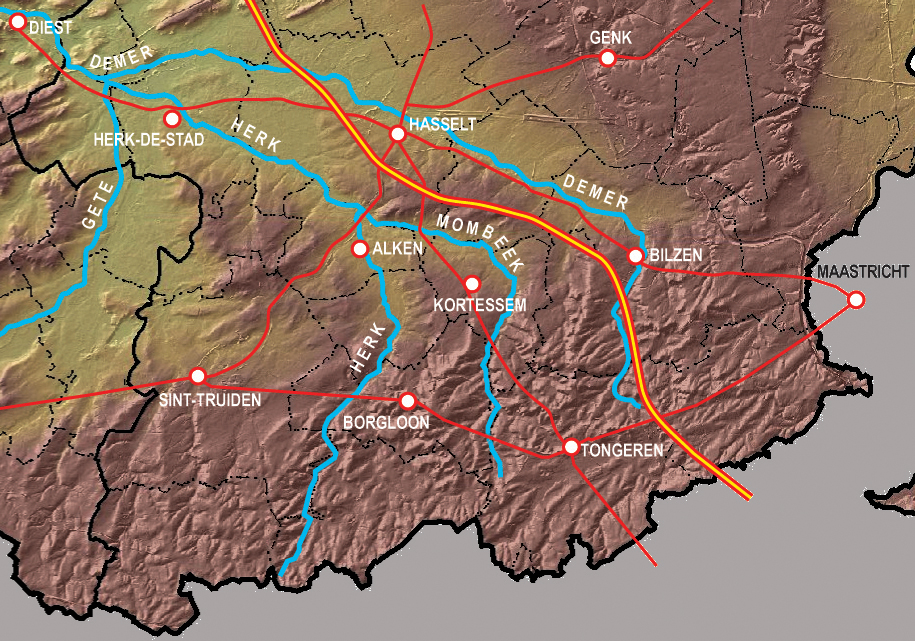
The Demer and its tributaries in the south of the province of Limburg

The Demer is an 85-kilometre (53 mi) long river in the eastern Flanders region of Belgium,and a right tributary of the Dijle. It flows through the Belgian provinces Limburg and Flemish Brabant. Its source is near Tongeren. It flows into the river Dijle in Werchter, Rotselaar municipality.

The most important towns along the Demer are (starting from the source) Bilzen, Hasselt, Diest and Aarschot. Tributaries of the Demer are the rivers Herk, Gete and Velp (all three in Halen).

The name "Demer" comes from the Celtic language words "tam" (dark coloured) and "ara" (water) giving rise to a name meaning "dark coloured river". The Winter brook (Beringen) is a tributary of the Demer River.
