= Halen =

- City and municipality
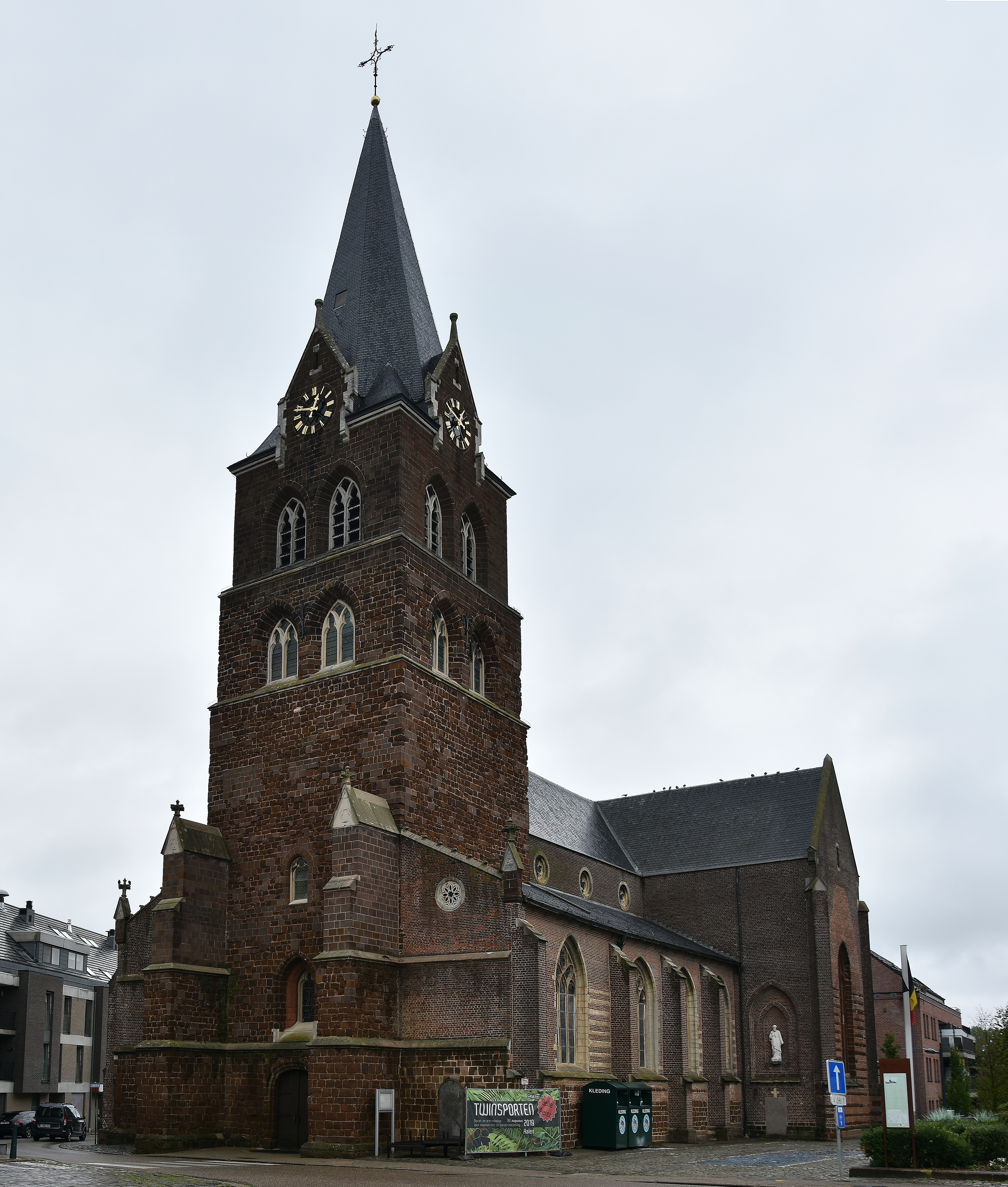

- Flag Coat of arms

- Location of Halen in Limburg
- Interactive map of Halen
- Location in Belgium
- Coordinates: 50°56′53″N 05°06′52″E
- Country: Belgium
- Community: Flemish Community
- Region: Flemish Region
- Province: Limburg
- Arrondissement: Hasselt

Government
  - Mayor: Erik Van Roelen (CD&V)
  - Governing party: CD&V

Area
  - Total: 36.6 km^{2} (14.1 sq mi)

Population (2018-01-01)
  - Total: 9,461
  - Density: 258/km^{2} (670/sq mi)
- Postal codes: 3545
- NIS code: 71020
- Area codes: 013
- Website: www.halen.be

Halen (Dutch pronunciation: [ˈɦaːlə(n)]), formerly Haelen (Limburgish: Hôle), is a municipality and city located in the Belgian province of Limburg, to the west of Hasselt. On January 1, 2018, Halen had a total population of 9,461. The total area is 36.29 km^{2} which gives a population density of 261 inhabitants per km^{2}.

The municipality consists of the following sub-municipalities: Halen proper, Loksbergen, and Zelem.

During the First World War, on August 12, 1914, the Battle of Halen took place here near the river crossing of the Gete.
