= Nete (river) =

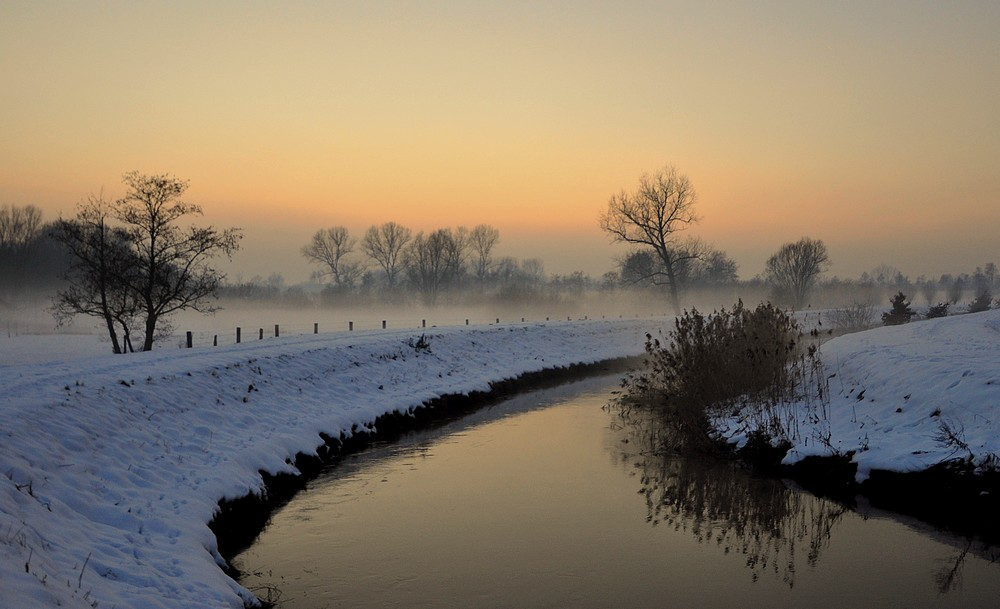
- The Grote Nete

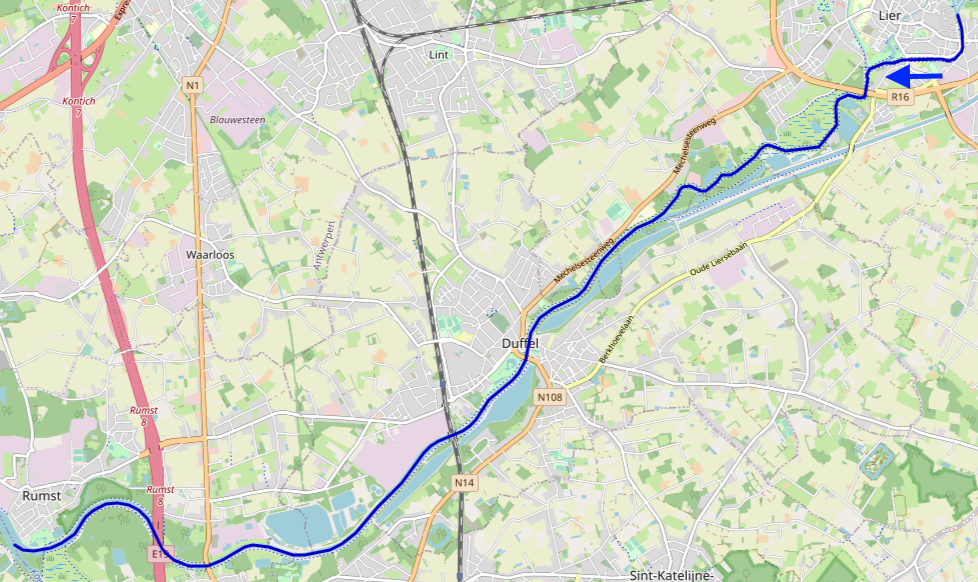

Location
- Country: Belgium

Physical characteristics
- Source
  - location: Lier
  - coordinates: 51.1315°N 4.5813°E
- Mouth
  - location: Rupel
  - coordinates: 51.0735°N 4.4201°E
- Length: 98 km (61 mi) (Nete 13 km, Grote Nete 85 km)
- Basin size: 1,673 km^{2} (646 sq mi)

Basin features
- Progression: Rupel→ Scheldt→ North Sea

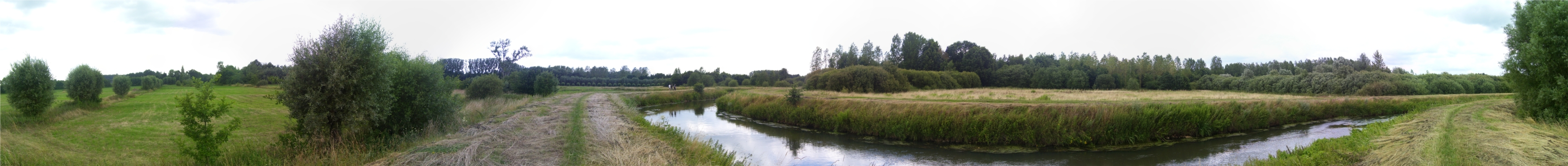
The Grote Nete near Heist-op-den-Berg

The Nete (Dutch pronunciation: [ˈneːtə]; French: Nèthe, French pronunciation: [nɛt]) is a river in northern Belgium, right tributary of the Rupel. It flows through the Belgian province of Antwerp. It is formed in Lier, at the confluence of the rivers Grote Nete and Kleine Nete. It flows through Duffel and joins the river Dijle in Rumst to form the river Rupel. It drains nearly 60% of Antwerp province.

== Grote Nete ==
The Grote Nete (Big Nete) river is about 85 km long and has its source near Hechtel in the Belgian province of Limburg. It flows in a western direction along the towns Geel, Westerlo and Heist-op-den-Berg before joining the Kleine Nete in Lier. Its main tributaries are the Molse Nete near Geel, the Grote Laak near Westerlo, and the Wimp near Herenthout.

== Kleine Nete ==
The Kleine Nete (Small Nete) river is about 50 km long and has its source near Retie in the Belgian province of Antwerp. North of the Grote Nete flows in south-western direction along the towns Herentals and Nijlen before joining the Grote Nete in Lier. Tributaries, all coming from the North, include the Wamp near Kasterlee, the Aa near Grobbendonk, and the Molenbeek-Bollaak near Nijlen.

== History ==
During the French occupation of the Southern Netherlands (1792–1815) there was a département named after the river Nete, see Deux-Nèthes.

== Natural landscapes ==
In the valley of the Grote Nete lies the Scheps natural landscape, between Olmen and Scheps.
