= Scheps (landscape) =

Coordinates: 51°09′04″N 5°10′35″E

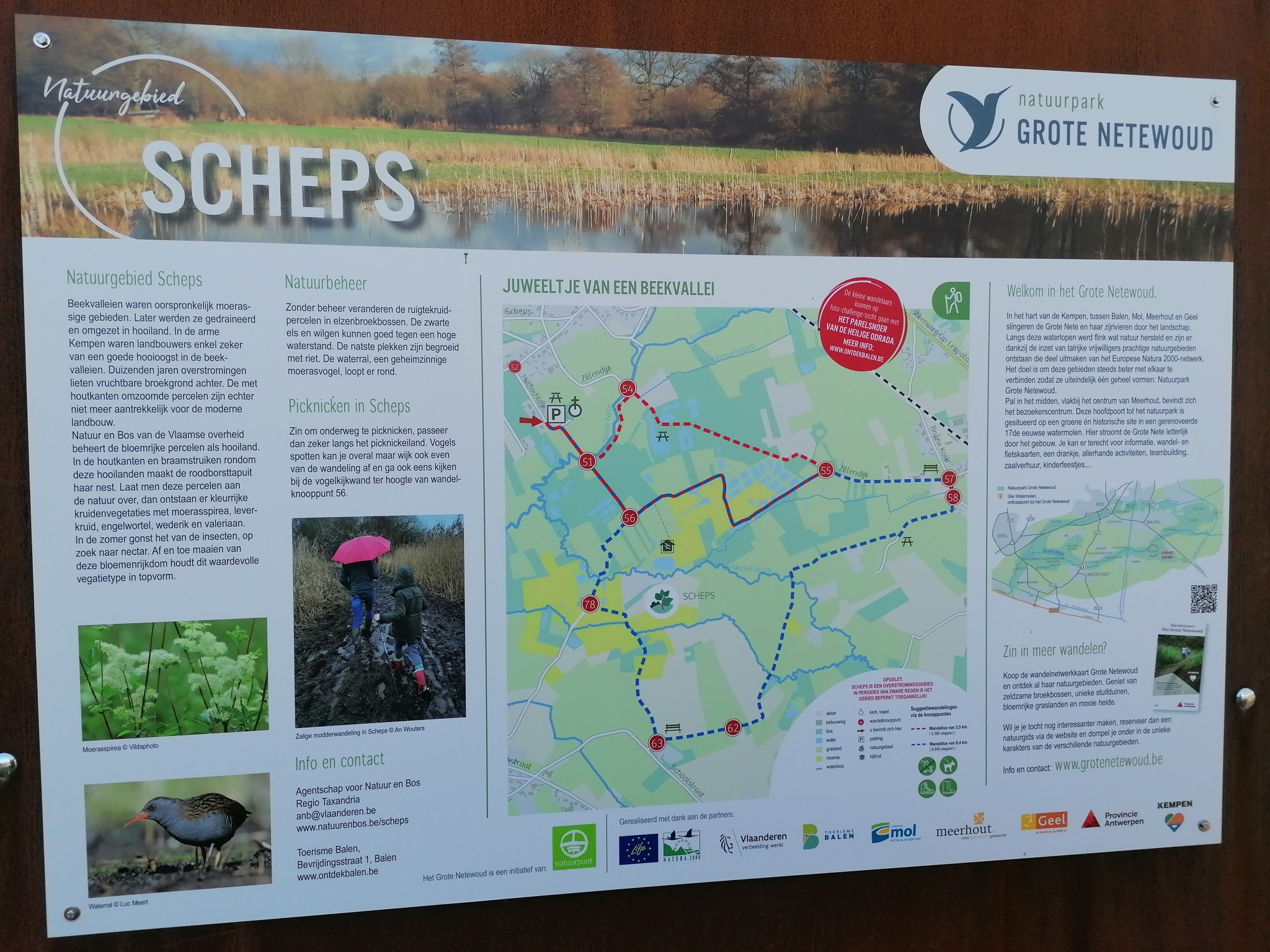

Scheps is a natural landscape in the municipality of Balen, Antwerp Province, Belgium.

Located in the valley of the Grote Nete, between Olmen and Scheps, several plants, such as the marsh cinquefoil and the calla, and birds like the common kingfisher, the European stonechat and the bluethroat can be found in this territory.
