= La Esterella =

Belgian singer (1919–2011)

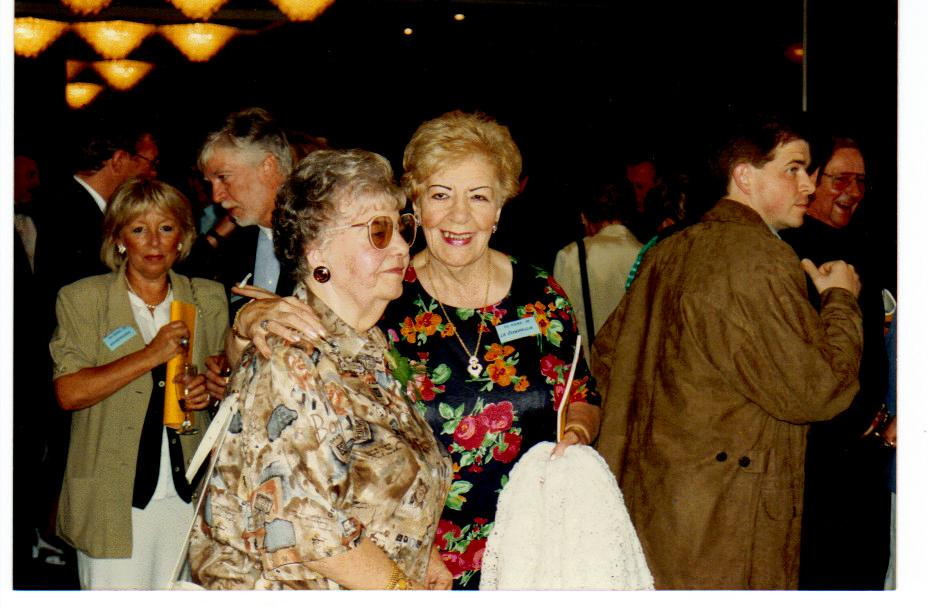
- Ke Riema & Esterella (1995)

Background information
- Also known as: La Esterella
- Born: Ester Lambrechts; 7 May 1919; Antwerp, Belgium
- Died: 11 April 2011 (aged 91) Antwerp, Belgium
- Occupation: Singer
- Years active: 1940–1962, 1982–2011
- Website: laesterella.be

La Esterella, born Ester Lambrechts (7 May 1919 – 11 April 2011) was a Belgian schlager singer. She was best known for her classic "Oh Lieve Vrouwetoren". She had a typical deep voice, causing her to be called sometimes the Belgian Zarah Leander. La Esterella was the first Flemish artist who achieved international success. She was born and died in Antwerp

== Biography ==
Lambrechts began working as a seamstress before becoming a professional singer. She occasionally sang at parties and was thus noticed by the conductor Jacques Kluger. But, when asked, she refused to sing in his band because she didn't have parental permission. In 1940 she began participating in song contests in the music hall Oud-België in Antwerp. There she was discovered by her future husband and manager Charly Schleimovitz. She began her career as a singer of popular light classical and romantic songs in several languages. Her voice could span three and a half octaves. She had an immediate success with the public. Her husband didn't just arrange the business agreements but also taught her how to become a professional singer, turning her into a perfectionist.

During World War II, she was forced to perform in Germany where she was called "die Kanone". After the war, she became a success with the general public and performed every year during six months from 1948–54 in British seaside resorts. In 1948, she sang on the BBC. In 1948 she sang in other European countries such as France, Norway and Czechoslovakia, where she always sung at least one song in the local language.

In 1953 she was offered a recording contract with Philips Records. From then on, the record company advised her to sing in her native Dutch language. In that year, her song "Oh Lieve Vrouwetoren" became an immediate hit. She continued to score hits, until 1959. In that year her husband became gravely ill and she decided to perform to a lesser degree. When her husband died in 1962, she stopped performing completely.

She accepted a job as secretary and remarried in 1970. Her second husband Victor Van Buel died in 1980. After her retirement in 1982, she agreed somewhat surprisingly to the radio presenter Jos Baudewijn to act in his show "Vragen staat vrij." (Open questions). There she sang Frank Sinatra's song Ol' Man River. She got such good responses that she decided to resume her career. She rose in this second career to become a celebrated singer, cherished by the public at large. In 1988, she recorded her last album "Liedjes die ik graag zing" ("My favourite songs"). In later years she sporadically recorded some songs, including in 1995 with Coco Jr. In 2000 she finally recorded the soundtrack of the film Shades with Alex Callier of Hooverphonic and Regi Penxten of Milk Inc.

In 2001 she received the achievement award of Radio 2: Voor een Leven Vol Muziek (For a Life filled with Music) and was admitted to the Hall of Fame of the Flemish Song. She was also appointed to the rank of Officer in the Order of Leopold II.

In 2004 she presented together with the first Antwerp City poet (Tom Lanoye), the poem "De kathedraal antwoordt" (The cathedral replies). Although she began to have problems walking at her old age, she continued performing. Occasionally she was back on major stages and did some TV appearances. On 5 January 2007 she sang a duet with Paul Michiels in the TV show "Gala Gaston 80", honouring the Flemish comedian Gaston Berghmans at his 80th birthday.

In 2008, she continued to struggle with health problems and had to spend three months in a hospital. She had then to retire to a nursing home, where the aged Flemish actress Yvonne Verbeeck also stayed.

== Death ==
On 11 April 2011, Esterella died in a hospital in Antwerp, aged 91. On 16 April, her funeral was attended by a large crowd. On 18 April, she was interred in Schoonselhof cemetery in Antwerp.

== Discography ==
=== Singles (incomplete) ===
- Und wieder geht ein schöner Tag zu Ende (1942–1943)
- Alleen door jou (1952)
- Oh! Lieve Vrouwe toren (1953)
- Voor een kusje van jou (1953)
- Het lied van mijn hart (1953)
- Eeuwig (1953)
- Dank (1953)
- Alle moeders (1954)
- In je hart (1954)
- Kom bij mij (1954)
- 't Is zo goed (1954)
- Ave Maria (1955)
- Goedenacht... tot morgen (1955)
- Zachtjes, zachtjes (1955)
- Mandolino (1955)
- Heden en verleden (1955)
- Weldra komt de dag (1955)
- Zonneschijn voor iedereen (1955)
- Arrivederci Roma (1956)
- La luna (1956)
- Refrein (1956)
- Ga hand in hand (1956)
- Bij het open vuur (1956)
- Het lied van Lima (1957)
- Klimrozen bloeiden (1957)
- Verliefde ogen (1957)
- Steeds denk ik aan jou (1958)
- Maria's kind (1958)
- Rozen vallen uit de hemel (1959)
- Liefdesvreugd, liefdesleed (1959)
- Het liedje zonder woorden (1959)
- De dag dat ons kindje komt (1959)
- Mexicaans liefdeslied (1959)
- Zeg de waarheid (1960)
- Vieni, vieni, qui (1960)
- Carnaval in Madrid (1962)
- Heimwee (1984)
- Do you know what it means (1999)

=== Albums ===
- De gouden stem van La Esterella (1, 2 en 3) (1969, 1970 en 1971)
- Het beste van La Esterella (1974)
- Liedjes die ik steeds graag zong (1988)
- De levende legende (1989)
- Het beste van La Esterella (1997)
- Oh Lieve Vrouwe toren (2002)
