= Pakawi Park =

Coordinates: 51.1276°N 5.1468°E

Pakawi Park (formerly: Olmen Zoo)
- Interactive map of Pakawi Park (formerly: Olmen Zoo)
- Date opened: 1976
- Location: Olmen, Belgium
- Website: https://www.pakawipark.be (in Dutch)

Pakawi Park is a zoo in the Belgian village Olmen, which is part of the town of Balen. Until 22 June 2019 it was named "Olmense Zoo".

The zoo was opened in 1976 by Louis Roothooft, a former captain. He used to live near Antwerp where he had a private collection of foreign animals. He bought some land in Olmen and moved his animals to the new location. The Olmen Zoo was founded. As Roothooft loved the circus, a big circus tent was soon placed. Each day the animal carers did performance acts with the animals. Roothooft died mid 1990s and the park was sold to the Verheyen family in 1995.

The new owners had their own private collection of animals which were now transported to Olmen. The park was in a poor state, due to mismanagement of Roothooft, cages were not adapted to the animal needs and the number of customers was too low to make sufficient profits. That's why the park was renovated. The investments did succeed: the number of visitors raised from 9,000 to 200,000 in the first year. The circus tent was removed and no more acts were given.

On 11 October 2017, the zoo lost its license and was closed, due to animal welfare violations. The zoo reopened 18 November 2017 with a new license, after fixing most problems and making a new masterplan.

The zoo is specialized in felidae: African lions, white tigers, black leopards, Eurasian lynx, Servals, and cougars. The zoo has more than 200 different birds such as parrots, owls, eagles, flamingos, gruiformes and threskiornithidae. The zoo has of course other animals such as simian, rodents, small mammals, deer, snakes and bears.
