= Jef Geys =

Belgian artist

- Born: 29 May 1934; Leopoldsburg, Belgium
- Died: 12 February 2018 (aged 83); Genk, Belgium
- Education: photography, painting, experimental education, print
- Website: www.jef-geys.com

Jef Geys (29 May 1934 – 12 February 2018) was a Belgian artist born in Leopoldsburg, Belgium. Geys is known for his photography, painting, sculpture, films, installation art, publishing activities, and experimentation in art education.

Geys grew up in Faytlaan, Leopoldsburg and attended school at the Brothers of Love. He studied in the Academy of Antwerp under Piet Serneels, Maclot, Dolphyn and Strebelle, then gained a teaching diploma from the state school of Hasselt before starting work teaching in Woluwe-Saint-Lambert. In 1960, Geys was an appointed Teacher of Positive Aesthetics at a children's school in Balen until he left the position in 1989. The school focused on the educational experimentation in the arts, and included a studio and exhibition space, and arts laboratory.

== Work ==
Geys is known for the strong social and political motives of his work. He is perhaps best known for his proposal to blow up the Koninklijk Museum voor Schone Kunsten (KMSKA) in Antwerp in 1971 at the end of his solo exhibition held there.

In a letter to the Minister of Culture from November 1970, which was published later in the catalog Ooidonk 78, Geys described his plans about the explosion of the KMSKA as follows: "Departing from the idea that every society, authority, institution, organization, person, etc. includes the seeds of its own destruction, the first and most important task of every society, authority, etc. in my opinion is to recognize, isolate and neutralize these seeds. The most efficient way to achieve all this then seems to me to systematically, scientifically and deliberately set about the problem. […] So I would like to start a project, which, if executed, would result in the destruction of the Museum voor Schone Kunsten."

== Kempens Informatieblad ==
In 1971, Geys took on the freely-distributed newspaper Kempens Informatieblad which was a local publication in Kempen, Belgium, which is also called Campine (French). Geys prints and distributes Kempens house-to-house, and often produces them in line with his exhibitions. Geys is also known for having created a meticulous archive of his own work and Kempens since 1958, though the archive has been made inaccessible to all but the artist himself.

== Exhibitions ==
- C’est aujourd'hui dimanche, tiens ma jolie Maman voilà des roses blanches, toi qui les aimes tant!, Cneai, Chatou, France, 2014
- Lumière et Architecture, Cneai, Chatou, France, 2014
- KOME, Cneai, Chatou, France (2012)
- 'As Sombras de Lisboa '(The Shadows of Lisbon), Culturgest, Lisbon (photography exhibition) (2012)
- 'KOME', KMSK, Brussels, Koninklijk Museum voor Schone Kunsten (Royal Museums of Modern Art) (2012)
- "Geys: All the black and white photos to 1998" 'Martin Douven – Leopoldsburg – Jef Geys', M HKA, Antwerp (2011)
- “Woodward Avenue”, Contemporary Art Detroit (MOCAD), (2011)
- 'Quadra Medicinale', Biënnale van Venetië (2009)
- “Archive Fever“, ICP, New York, USA (2008)
- “Retrospective-Introspectie” Galerie Erna Hecey, Brussels (2007–2008)
- “Deep Comedy“, Marfa Gallery, Texas (2007)
- Orchard Gallery, New York, NY, USA (2007)
- IAC, Villeurbanne, France (2007)
- Pori Art Museum, Pori, Finland (2005)
- Kunsthalle Lophem, Loppem (2005)
- Van Abbemuseum, Retrospectieve, Eindhoven, The Netherlands (2004)
- Documenta 11, Kassel, Germany (2002)
- Galerie Meert-Rihoux, Brussels (2002)
- Kunstverein München, Germany, Solotentoonstelling (2001)
- Middelheim, Antwerp, Solo Exhibition (1999)
- Skulptur Projekte, Münster (1997)
- Frac, Champagne-Ardenne, France (1995)
- Witte de With, Rotterdam, The Netherlands (1993)
- Palais des Beaux-Arts, Brussels, Belgium (Paleis voor Schone Kunsten) (1992)
- São Paulo Biennial, Brazil (Biënnale van São Paulo) (1991)
- Galerie Meert-Rihoux (1990)
- Chambre d’Amis, Gent (1986)
