= Rumst =

- Municipality
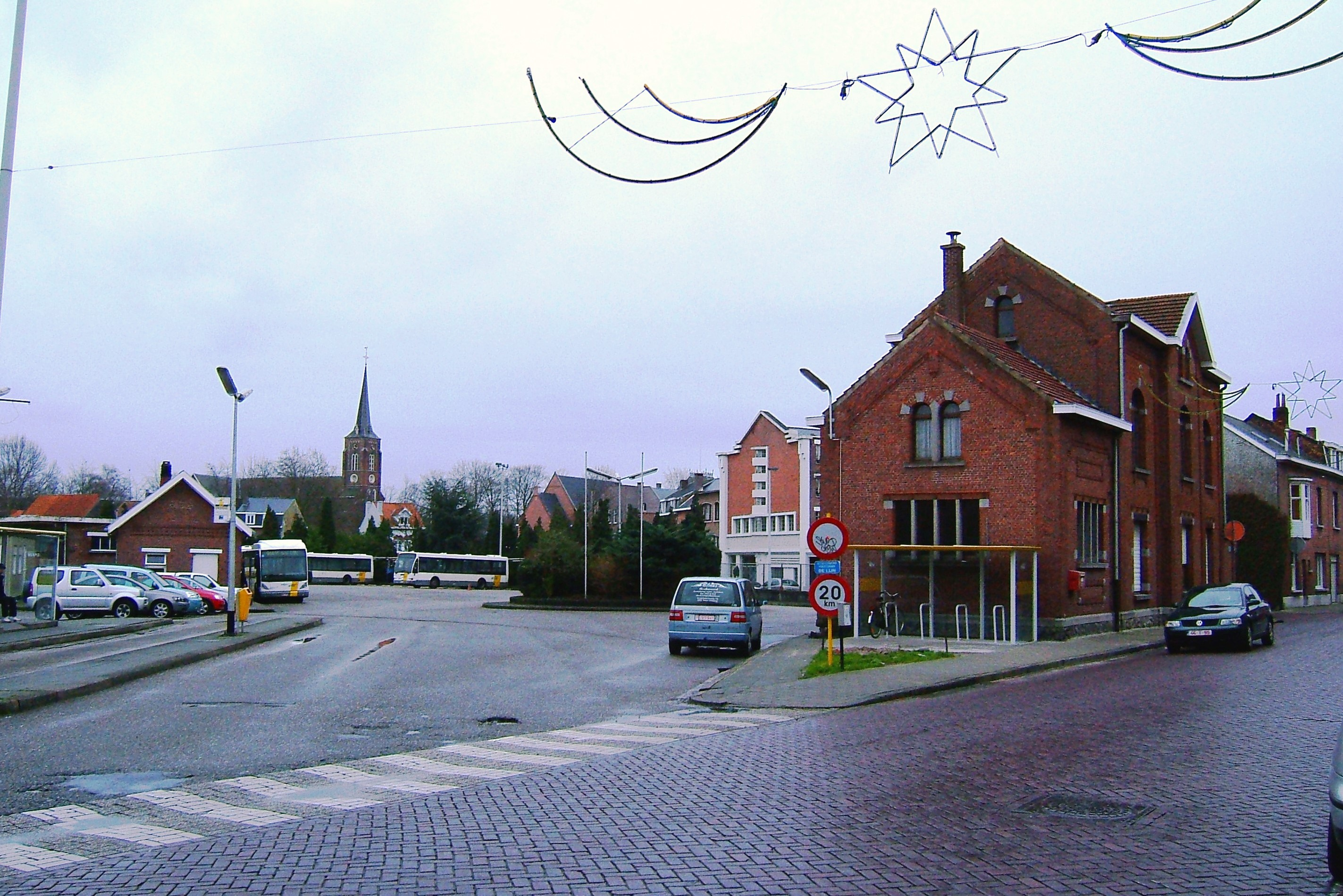

- Flag Coat of arms

- Location of Rumst in the province of Antwerp
- Interactive map of Rumst
- Location in Belgium
- Coordinates: 51°05′N 04°25′E
- Country: Belgium
- Community: Flemish Community
- Region: Flemish Region
- Province: Antwerp
- Arrondissement: Antwerp

Government
  - Mayor: Jurgen Callaerts (N-VA)
  - Governing parties: N-VA, CD&V -3D

Area
  - Total: 20.15 km^{2} (7.78 sq mi)

Population (2018-01-01)
  - Total: 15,114
  - Density: 750.1/km^{2} (1,943/sq mi)
- Postal codes: 2840
- NIS code: 11037
- Area codes: 03, 015
- Website: www.rumst.be

Rumst (Dutch pronunciation: [rʏmst], old spelling: Rumpst) is a municipality located in the Belgian province of Antwerp. Since 1976 the municipality has not only comprised Rumst proper but also the towns of Reet (old spelling: Reeth) and Terhagen, which had been independent municipalities before that year.

Industry in Rumst, like Boom, was heavily focused around the production of clay products like bricks. This industry has largely disappeared since 1970.

In Rumst, the river Rupel starts as a combination of the Dijle and Nete (river) rivers.

In 2021, Rumst had a total population of 15,146. The total area is 19.90 km^{2} (7.68 sq mi).

== Notable residents ==
- Kristof Calvo, Belgian politician, was born in Rumst
- Lotte Kopecky, Belgian cyclist, was born in Rumst
- Yvonne Verbeeck, actress
