= Niel, Belgium =

Niel
- Municipality
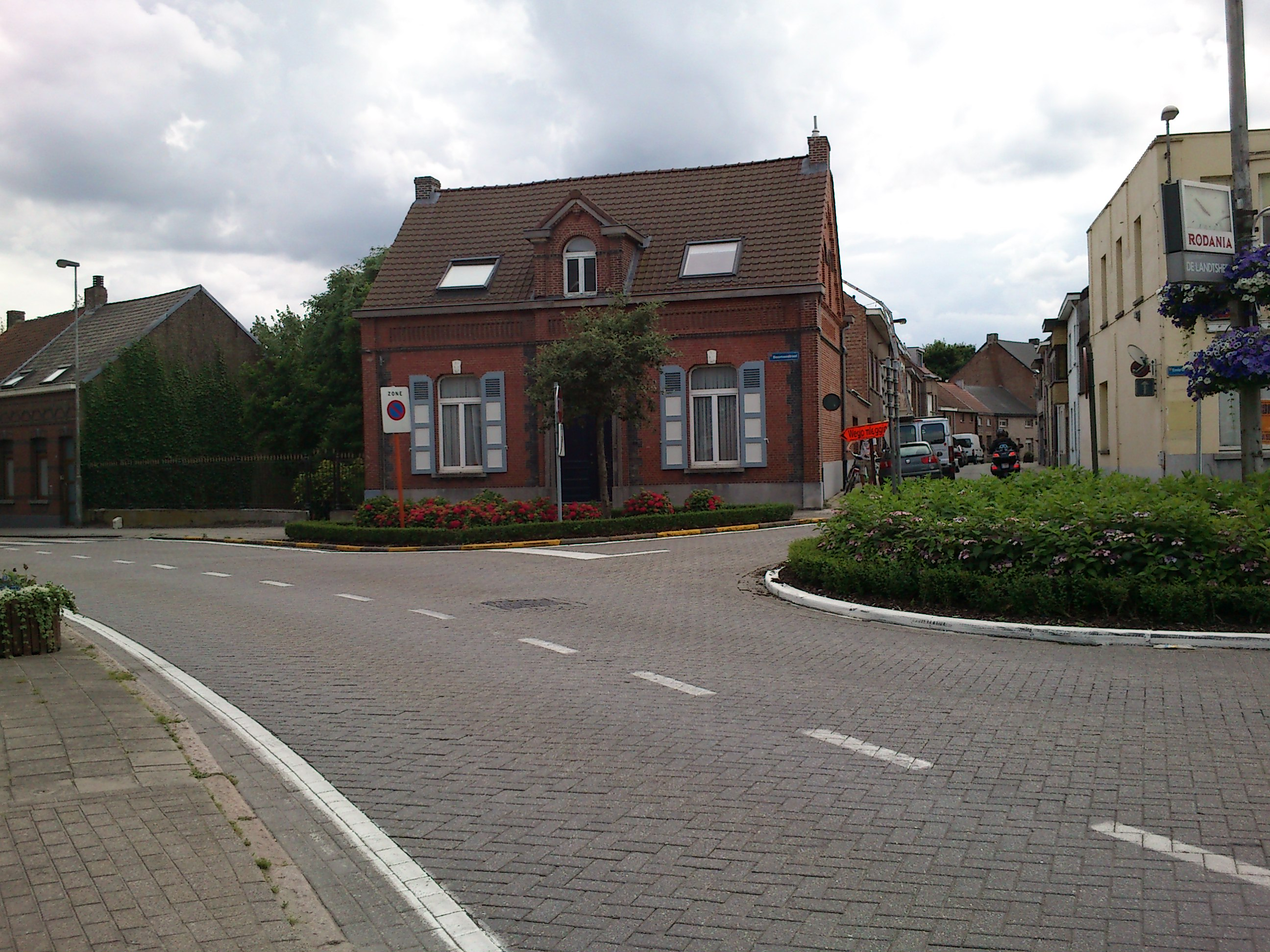

- Flag Coat of arms

- Location of Niel in the province of Antwerp
- Interactive map of Niel
- Location in Belgium
- Coordinates: 51°07′N 04°20′E
- Country: Belgium
- Community: Flemish Community
- Region: Flemish Region
- Province: Antwerp
- Arrondissement: Antwerp

Government
  - Mayor: Ellen Brits (Open VLD)
  - Governing parties: N-VA, Open Vld

Area
  - Total: 5.35 km^{2} (2.07 sq mi)

Population (2020-01-01)
  - Total: 10,546
  - Density: 1,970/km^{2} (5,110/sq mi)
- Postal codes: 2845
- NIS code: 11030
- Area codes: 03
- Website: www.niel.be

Niel (Dutch pronunciation: [nil]) is a municipality located in the Belgian province of Antwerp. The municipality only comprises the town of Niel proper. In 2021, Niel had a total population of 10,493. The total area is 5.27 km^{2}.

== History ==
Niel used to belong to the Lordship of Mechelen. In 1462, it became part of the Duchy of Brabant. Niel became an independent parish in the 14th century. During most of its history, it was an agricultural community along the Rupel river. In the 19th century, Niel became an industrial town with brickworks, cement factories and shoe factories.

== Sports ==
Niel is home to the Niel Jaarmarkt Cyclo-cross, a cyclo-cross race held in and around the town. The race forms part of the X²O Badkamers Trophy.

== Notable people ==
- Jan Decleir, actor, leading actor in the Academy Award-winning film Karakter, born in Niel

== Gallery ==
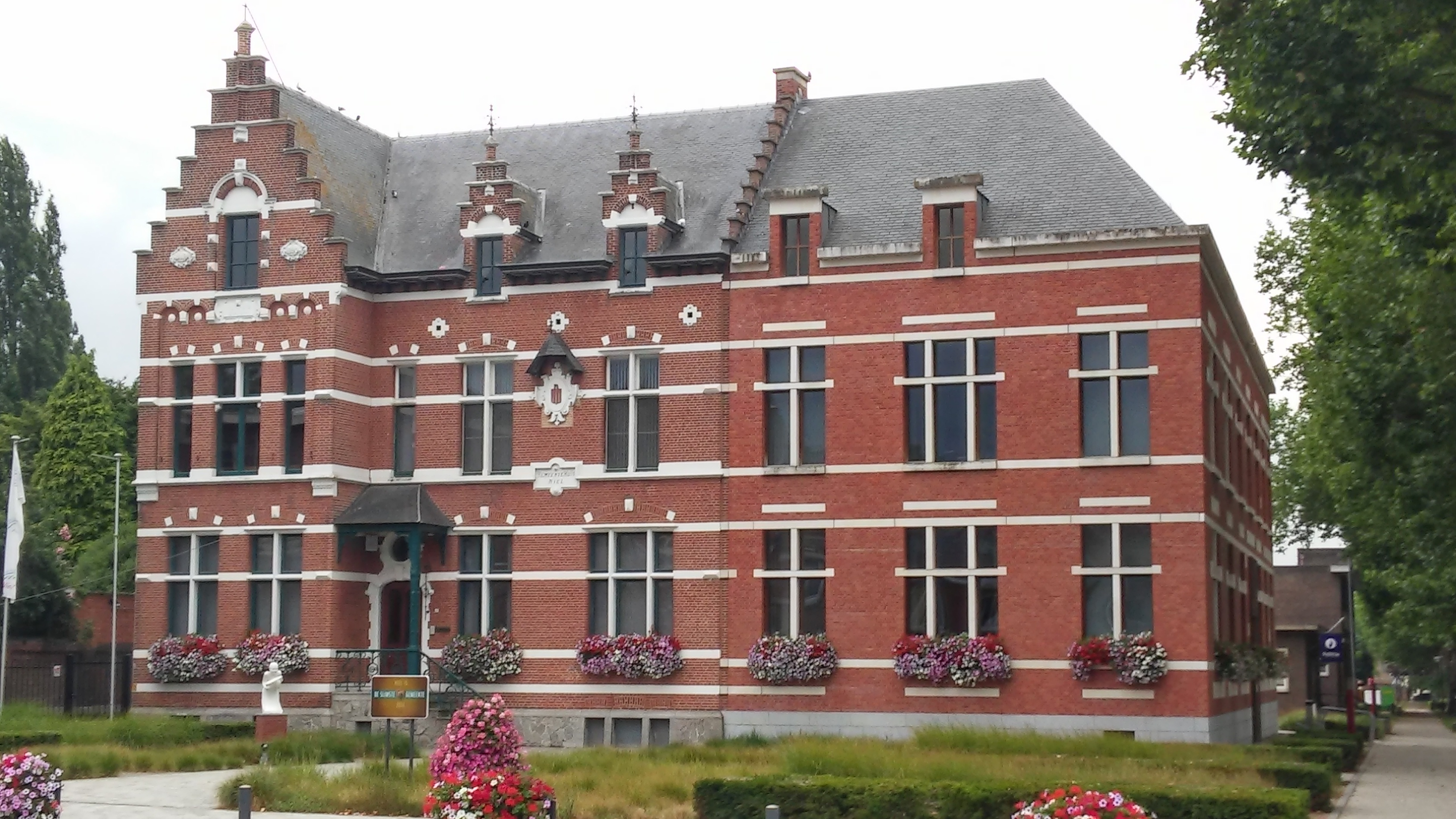
Town hall

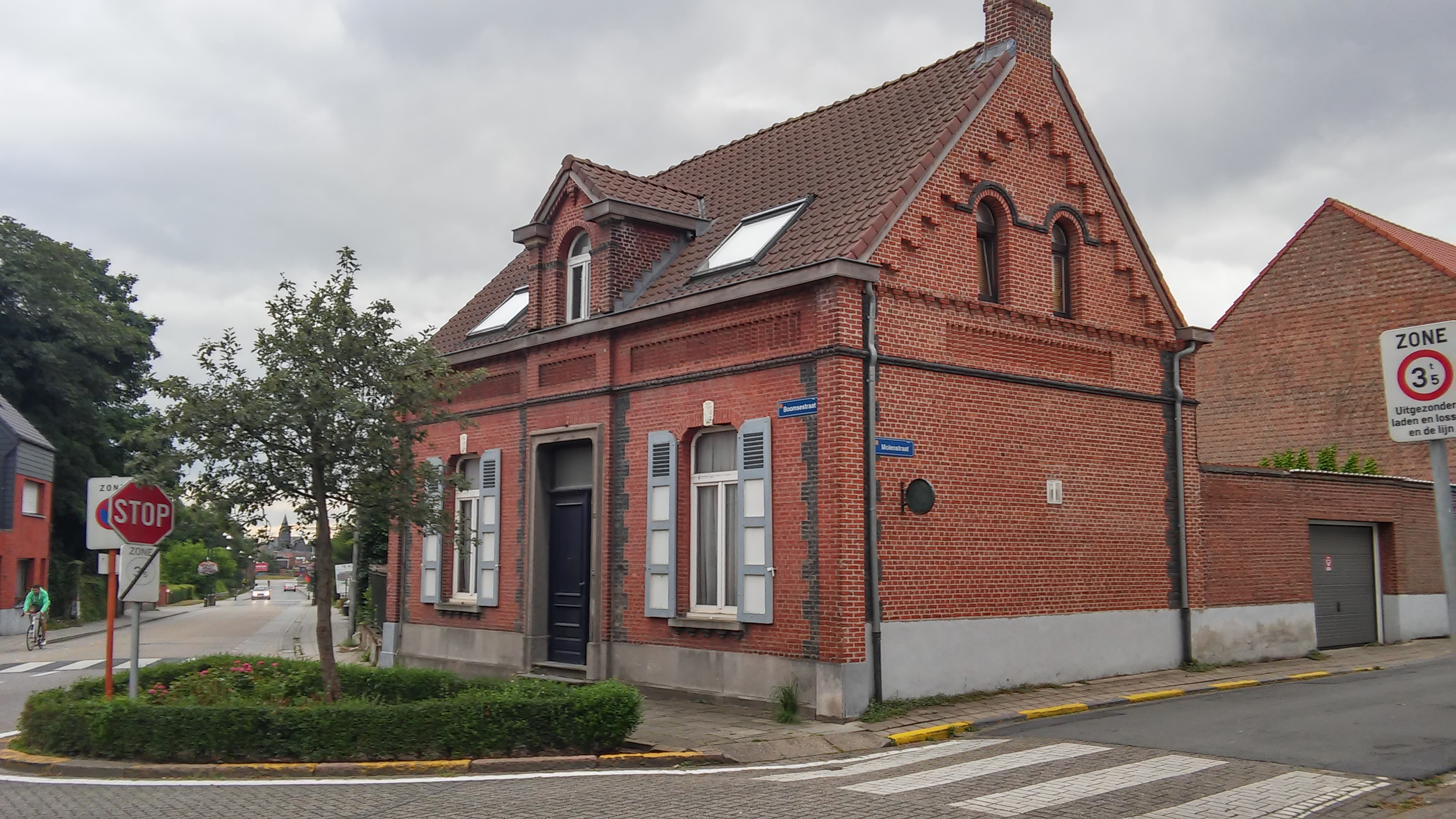
House in Niel

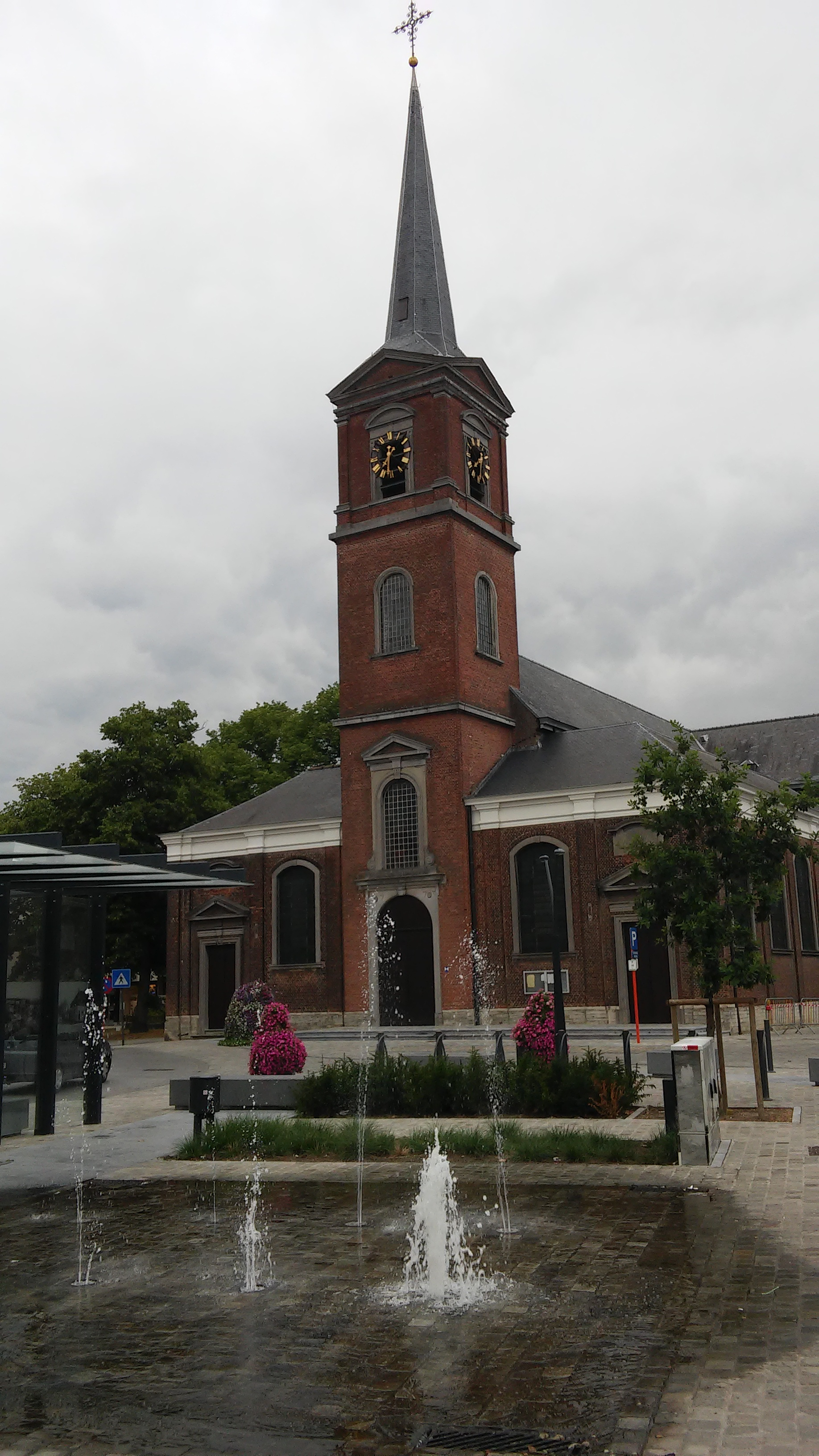
Our Lady Church in Niel

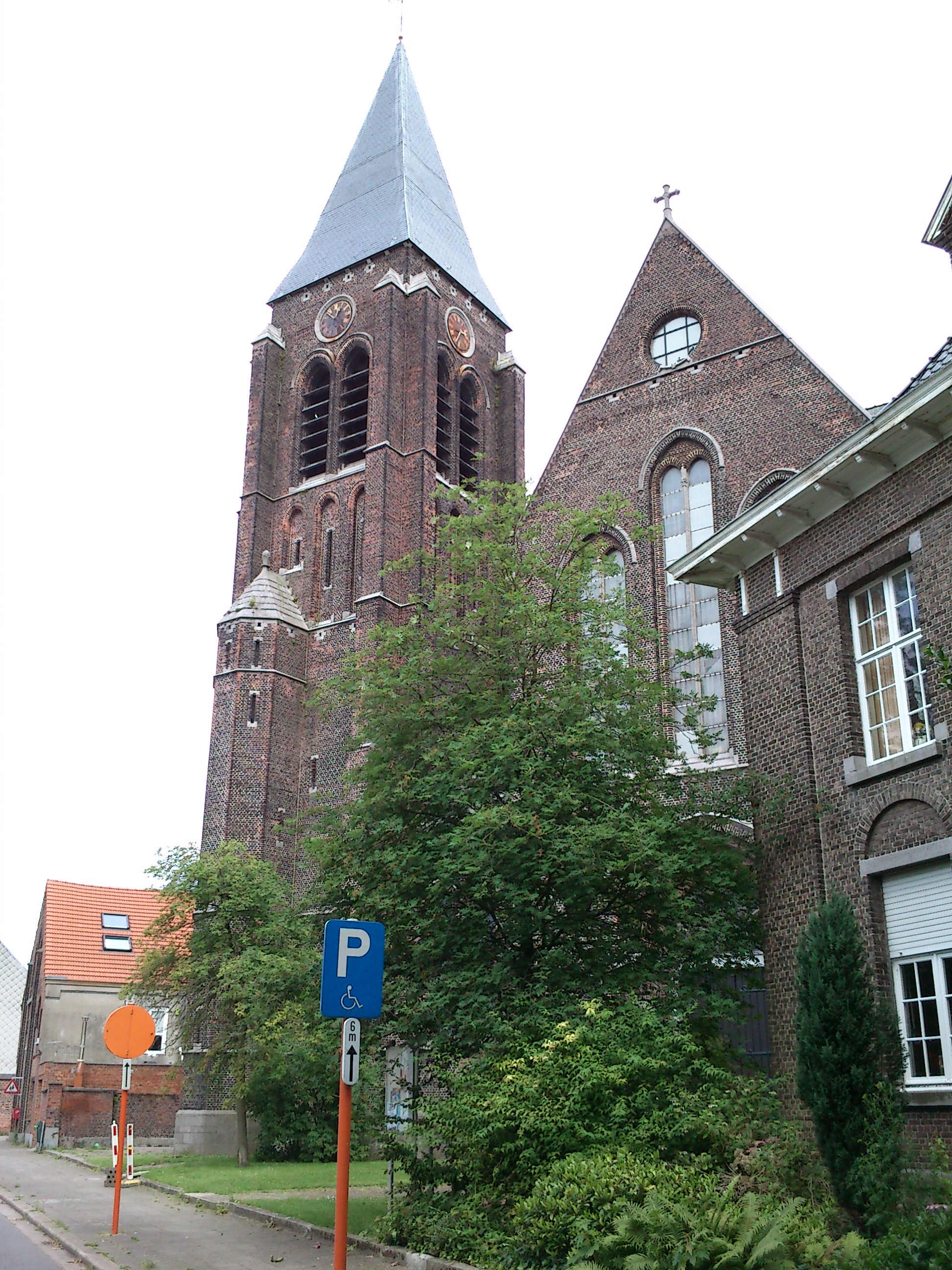
St Josef Church in Hellegat
