= Rupel =

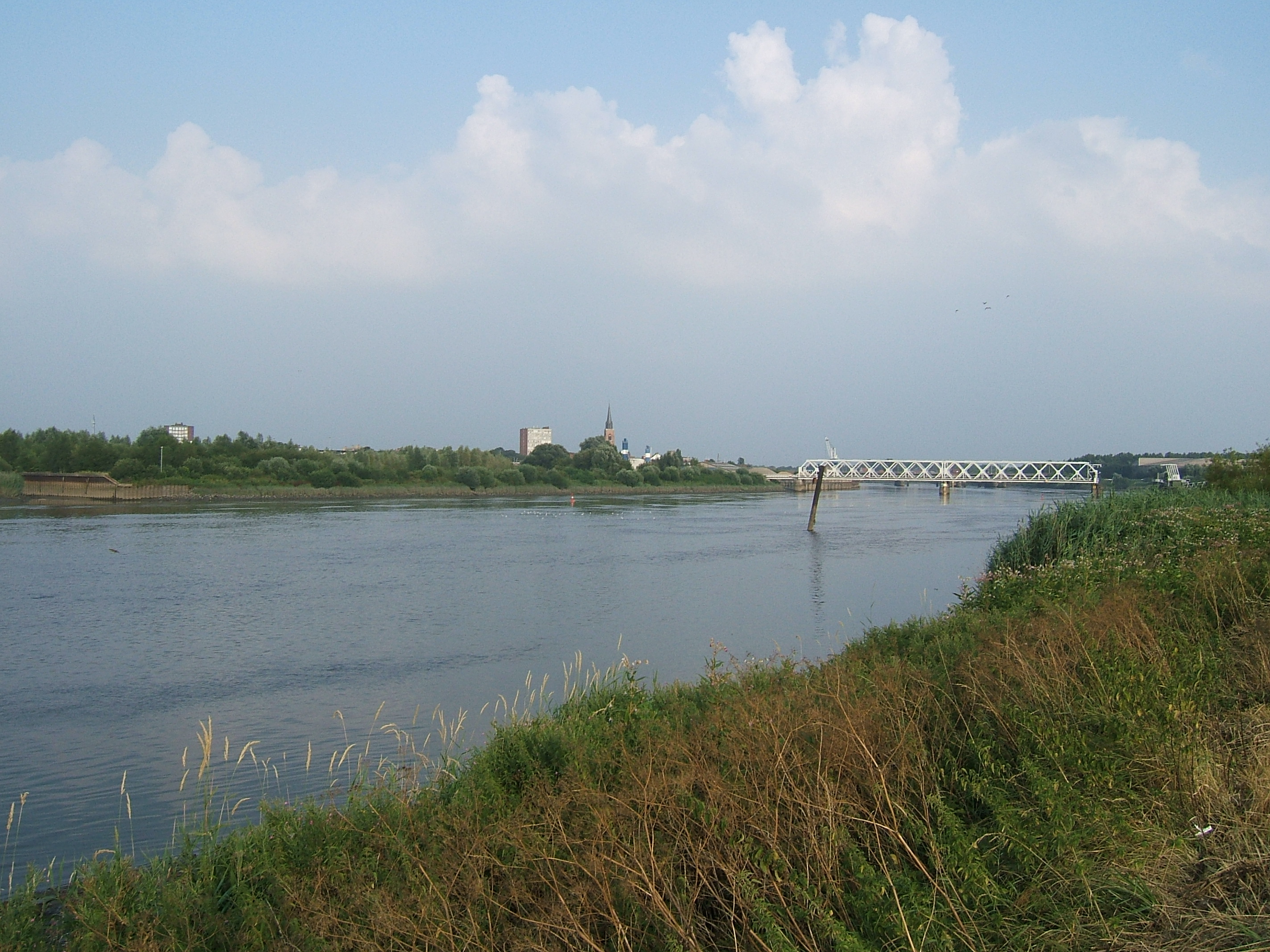
- The Rupel between Niel and Boom

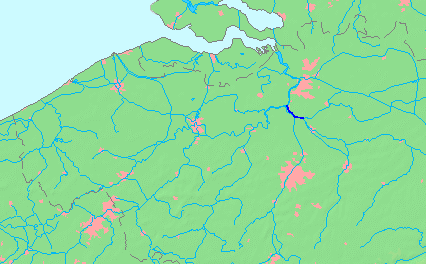
- Location of the Rupel

Location
- Country: Belgium

Physical characteristics
- Mouth: Scheldt
  - coordinates: 51°07′25″N 4°18′31″E
- Length: 12 kilometres (7.5 mi)

Basin features
- Progression: Scheldt→ North Sea

The Rupel (Dutch pronunciation: [ˈrypəl]) is a tidal river in northern Belgium, right tributary of the Scheldt. It is about 12 kilometres (7 mi) long. It flows through the Belgian province of Antwerp. It is formed by the confluence of the rivers Dijle and Nete, in Rumst. It flows into the Scheldt at Schelle. Towns along the Rupel are Rumst, Boom, Niel and Schelle. The Rupel is navigable, and forms part of the waterway to Brussels.

The Rupelian Age of the Oligocene Epoch in the geological time scale is named after this river.
