= Yvonne Verbeeck =

Belgian actress (1913–2012)

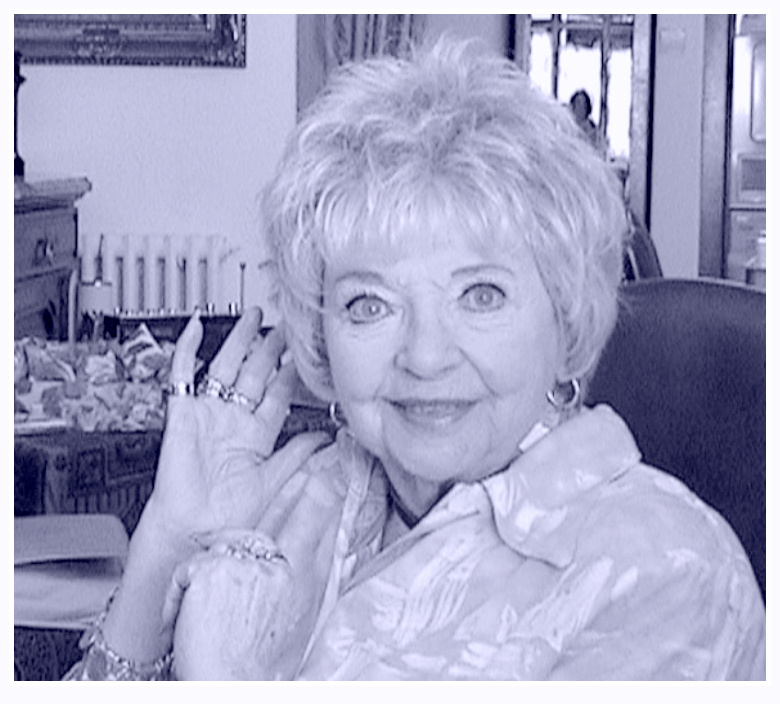
- Born: December 7, 1913; Rumst, Belgium
- Died: February 26, 2012 (aged 98); Antwerp, Belgium
- Occupations: Actress, comedian, singer
- Years active: c. 1930s–2008

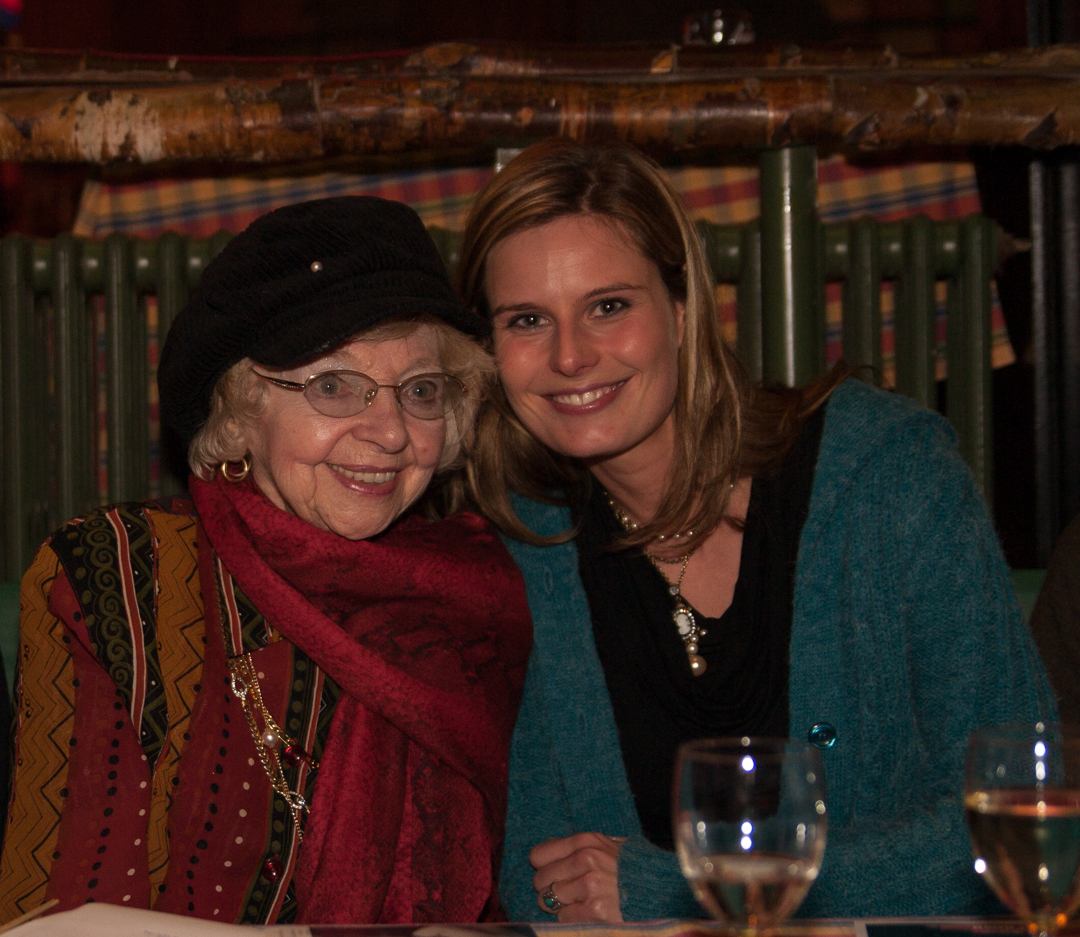
Yvonne Verbeeck (left)

Yvonne Verbeeck (7 December 1913 – 26 February 2012) was a Belgian Flemish actress known for roles in theater and television. She appeared in several Belgian films as well. Her last role was in the 2008 television series, Zone Stad. A bronze bust of Verbeeck is dedicated in her birthplace, Rumst.

Verbeeck died at the Nottebohm nursing home in Antwerp, where she had lived since 2006, on 26 February 2012, aged 98. Her funeral was held at the Cathedral of Our Lady in Antwerp.
