= Olmen =

- Village
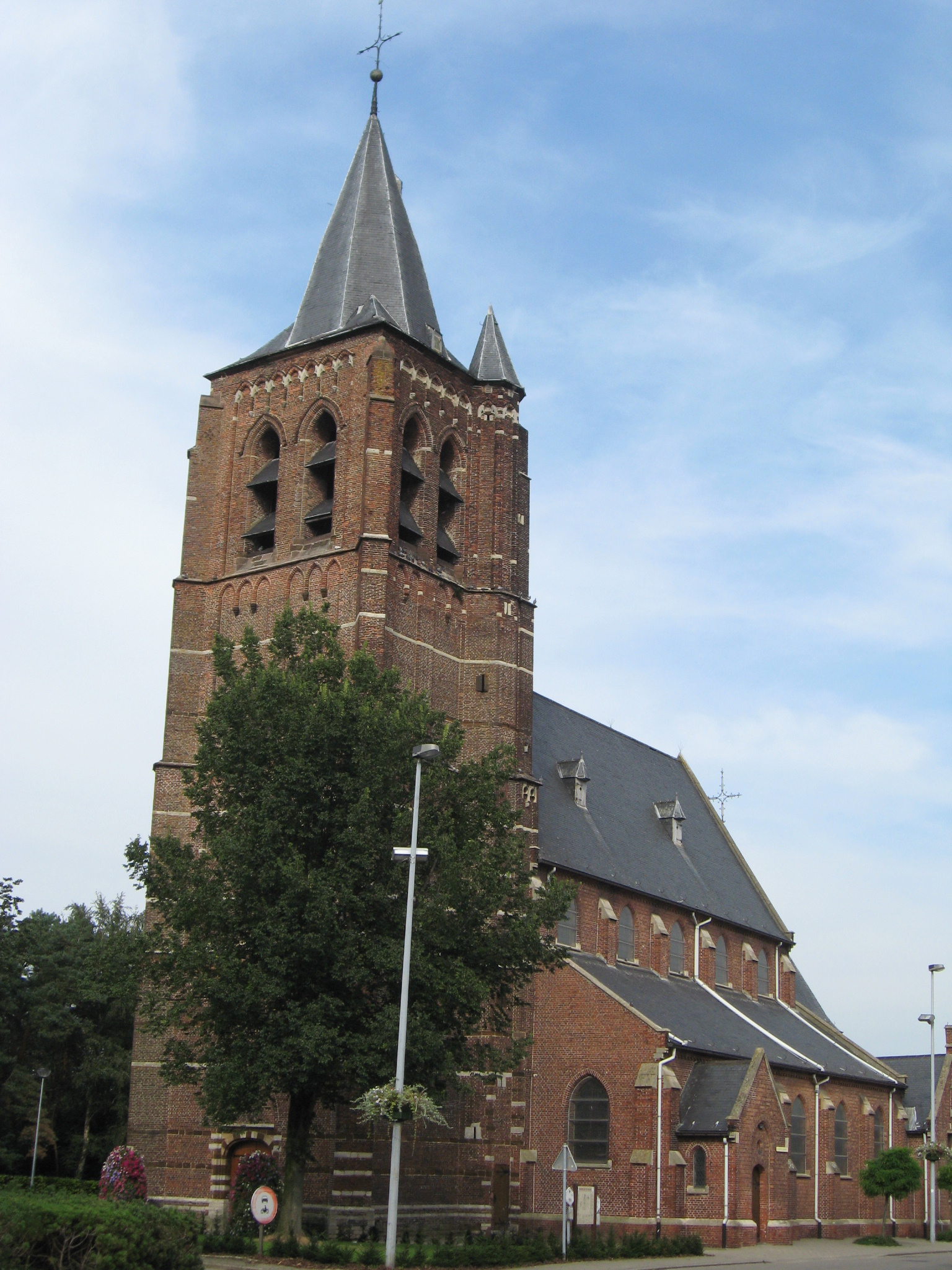
- Saint Willibrord Church

- Location in Belgium
- Coordinates: 51.14119°N 5.15079°E
- Country: Belgium
- Region: Flemish Region
- Province: Antwerp
- Municipality: Balen

Area
  - Total: 17.03 km^{2} (6.58 sq mi)

Population (2021)
  - Total: 3,788
  - Density: 222.4/km^{2} (576.1/sq mi)
- Time zone: CET

Olmen is a village in the province of Antwerp, Belgium. The village is part of the municipality of Balen.

Olmen is known in the area for its Carnival, which still follows medieval traditions.

== History ==
The village was first mentioned as Olmele in 1288. Olmen was an independent heerlijkheid and an agricultural community. In 1977, the municipality was merged into Balen.

== Carnaval ==
The Carnaval in Olmen does not have a parade, but is celebrated with the medieval Hanenkappen. The person who manages to decapitate the rooster becomes the king of its party.

== Zoo ==
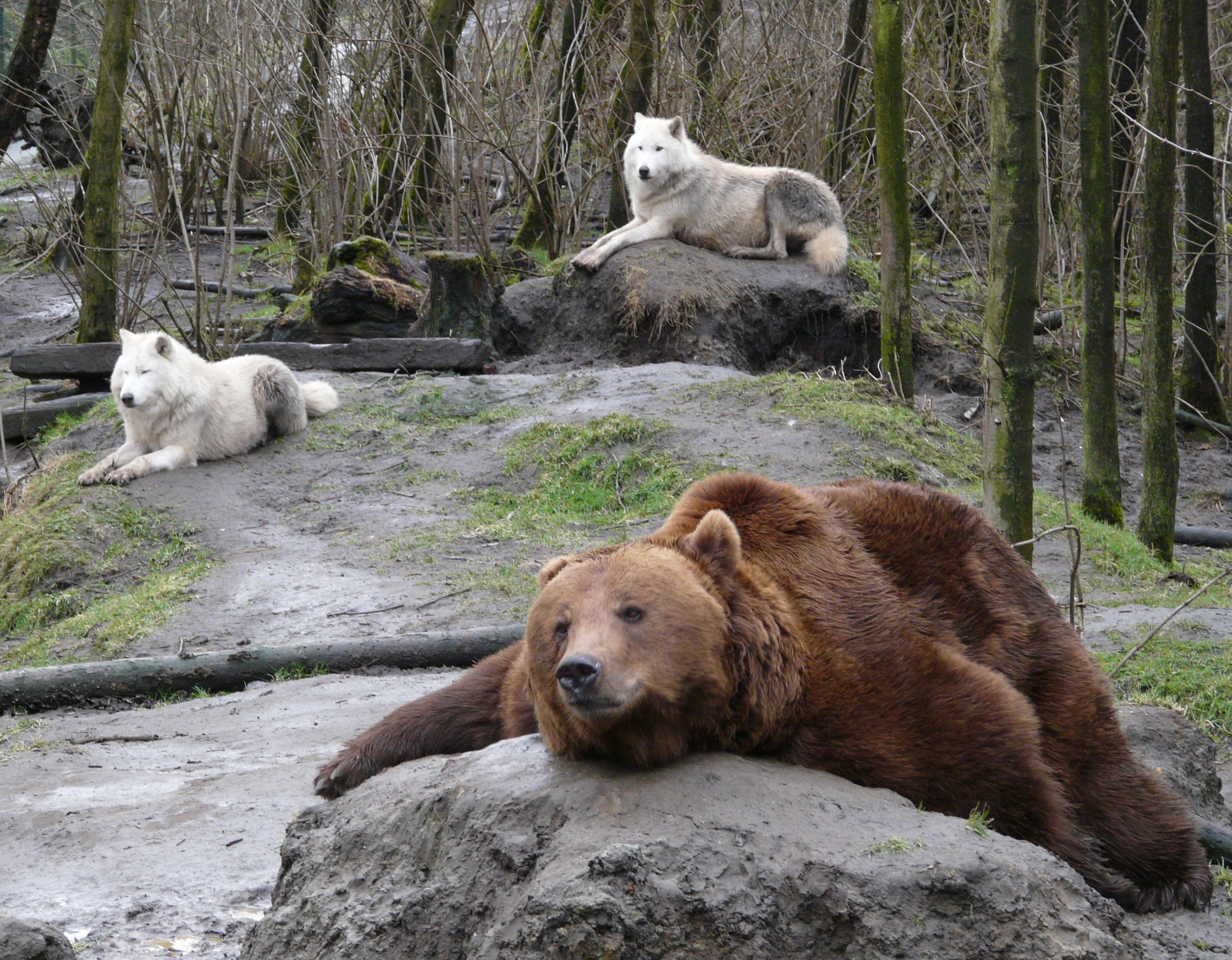
Bear and wolves resting in Pakawi Park

The Pakawi Park is a zoo in the village which specializes in felidae. The zoo used to be called Olmen Zoo, but was closed in 2017, due to animal welfare breaches. The owner and employees fixed most of the problems and at least tripled the living quarters of the animals. The zoo reopened on 22 June 2019 as Pakawi Park.
