= Balen, Belgium =

Municipality in Antwerp, Belgium

Balen
- Municipality
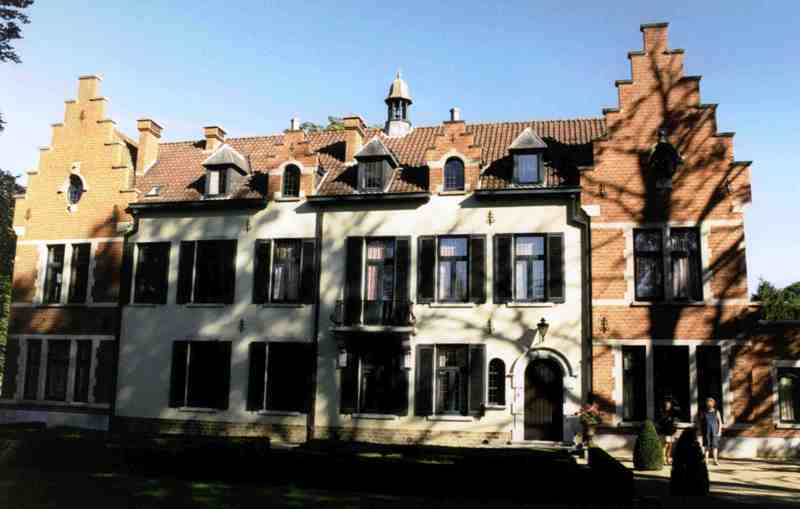
- Houses in Balen

- Flag Coat of arms

- Location of Balen in the province of Antwerp
- Interactive map of Balen
- Location in Belgium
- Coordinates: 51°10′N 05°09′E
- Country: Belgium
- Community: Flemish Community
- Region: Flemish Region
- Province: Antwerp
- Arrondissement: Turnhout

Government
  - Mayor: Johan Leysen (CD&V)
  - Governing parties: CD&V, Vooruit

Area
  - Total: 72.99 km^{2} (28.18 sq mi)

Population (2020-01-01)
  - Total: 22,813
  - Density: 312.5/km^{2} (809.5/sq mi)
- Postal codes: 2490, 2491
- NIS code: 13003
- Area codes: 014, 011
- Website: www.balen.be

Balen (Dutch pronunciation: [ˈbaːlə(n)]) is a municipality located in the Belgian province of Antwerp. The municipality comprises the towns of Balen proper and Olmen. In 2021, Balen had a population of 22,853. The total area of Balen is 72.88 km^{2}.

== Famous Inhabitant ==
- Tom Boonen, World Cycling Champion in 2005.
- Jef Geys, internationally known artist, taught Positive Aesthetics at a children's school in Balen between 1960 and 1989.

== Gallery ==
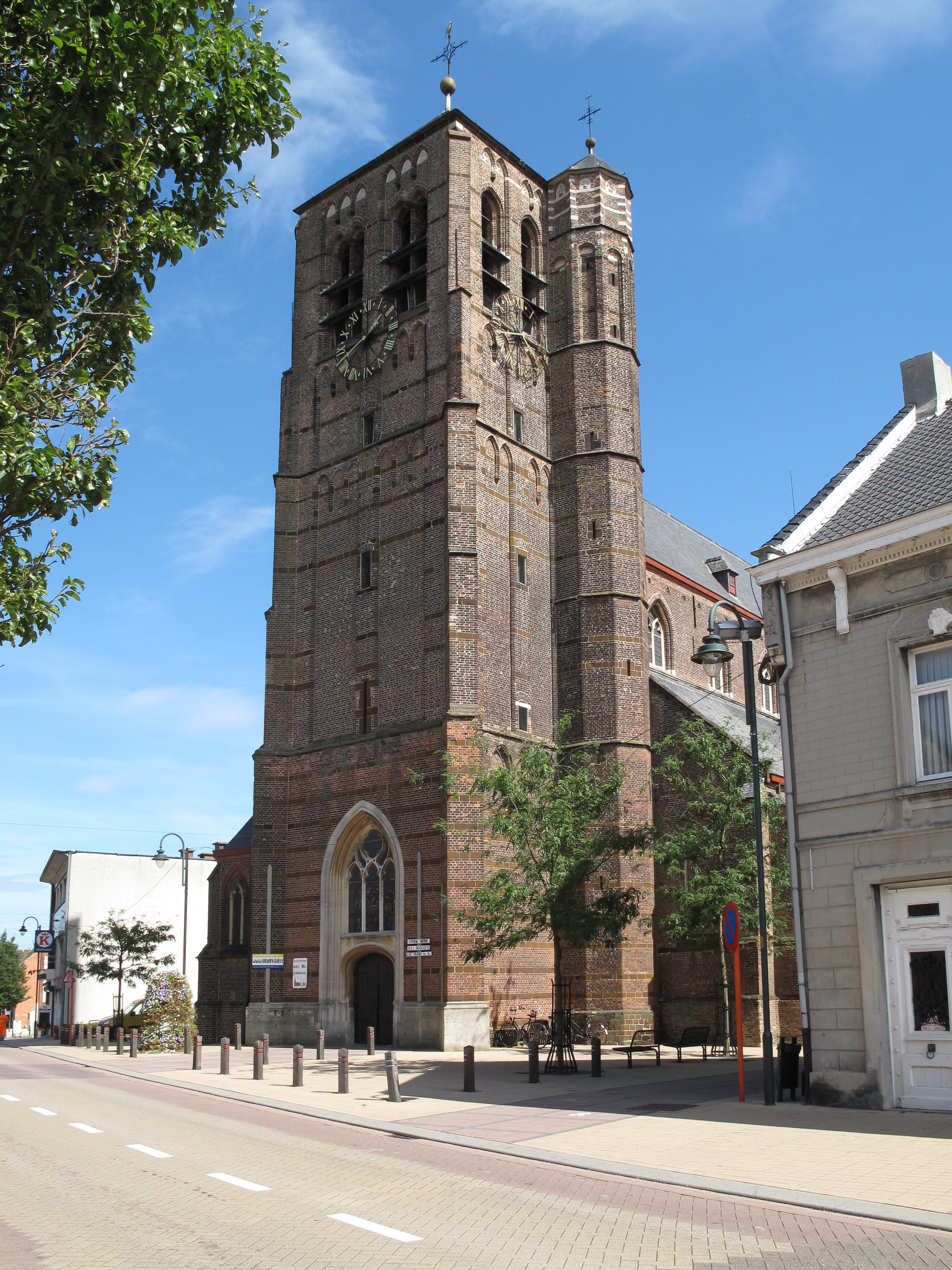
Balen, church

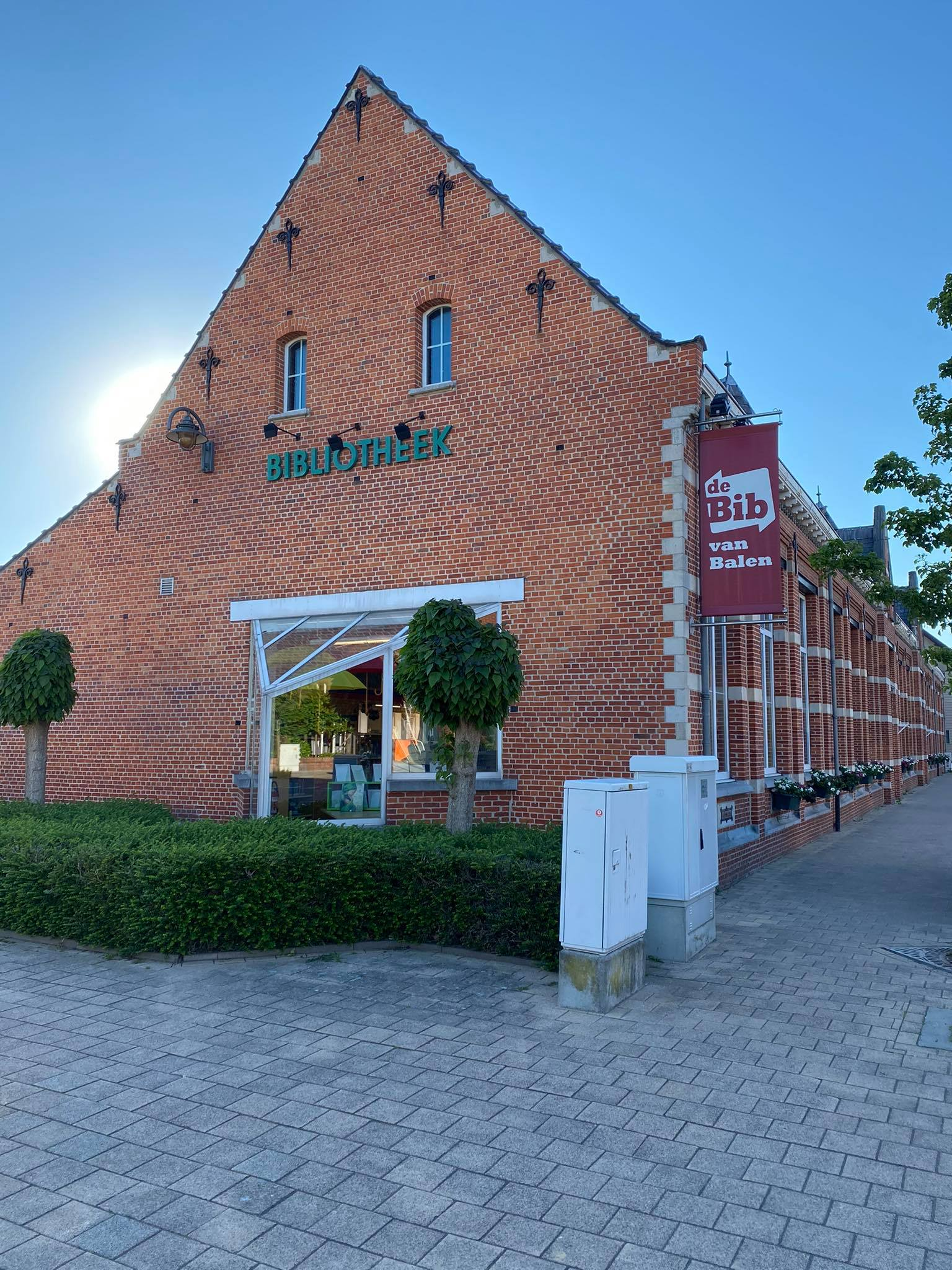
Library

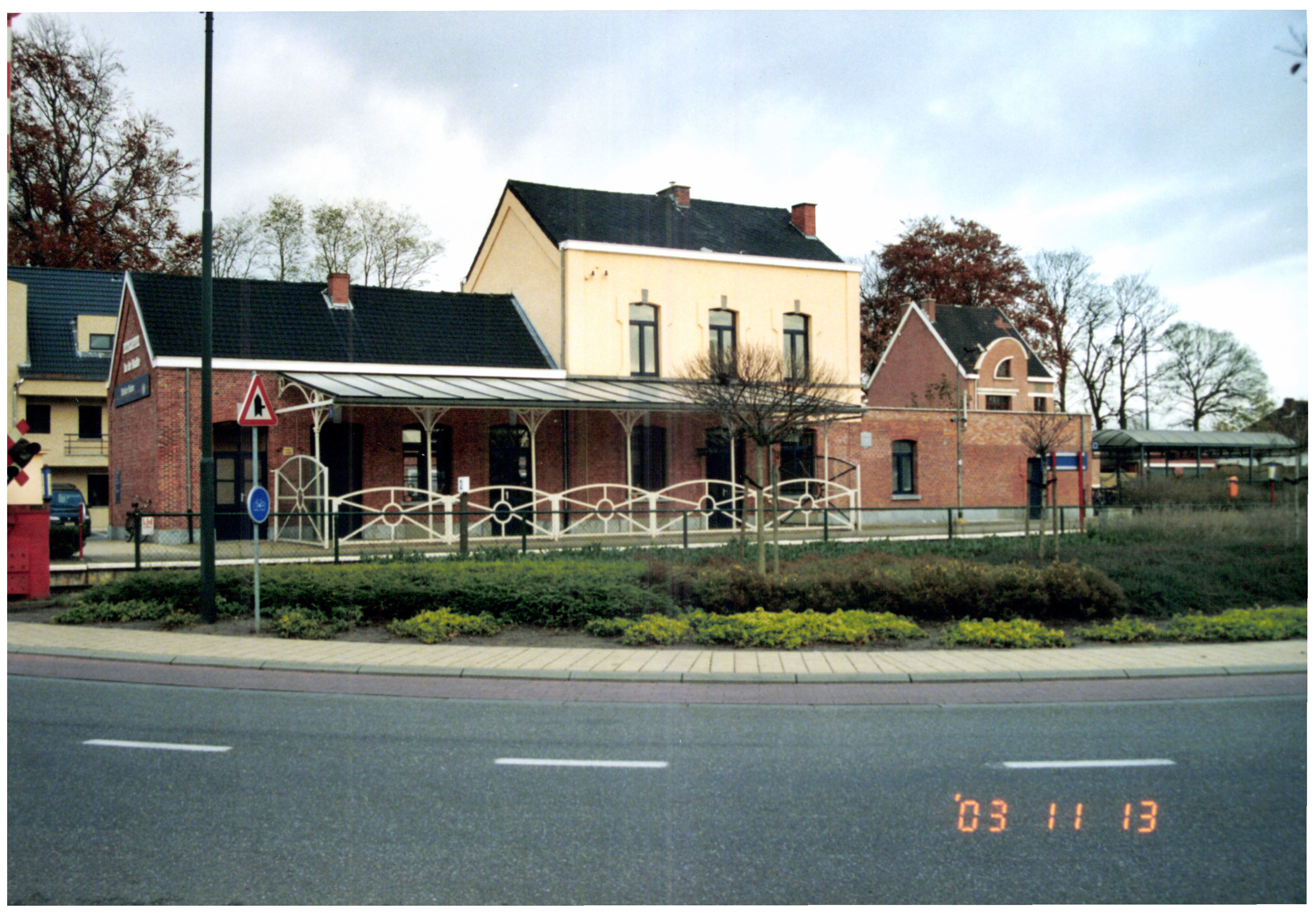
Balen railway station

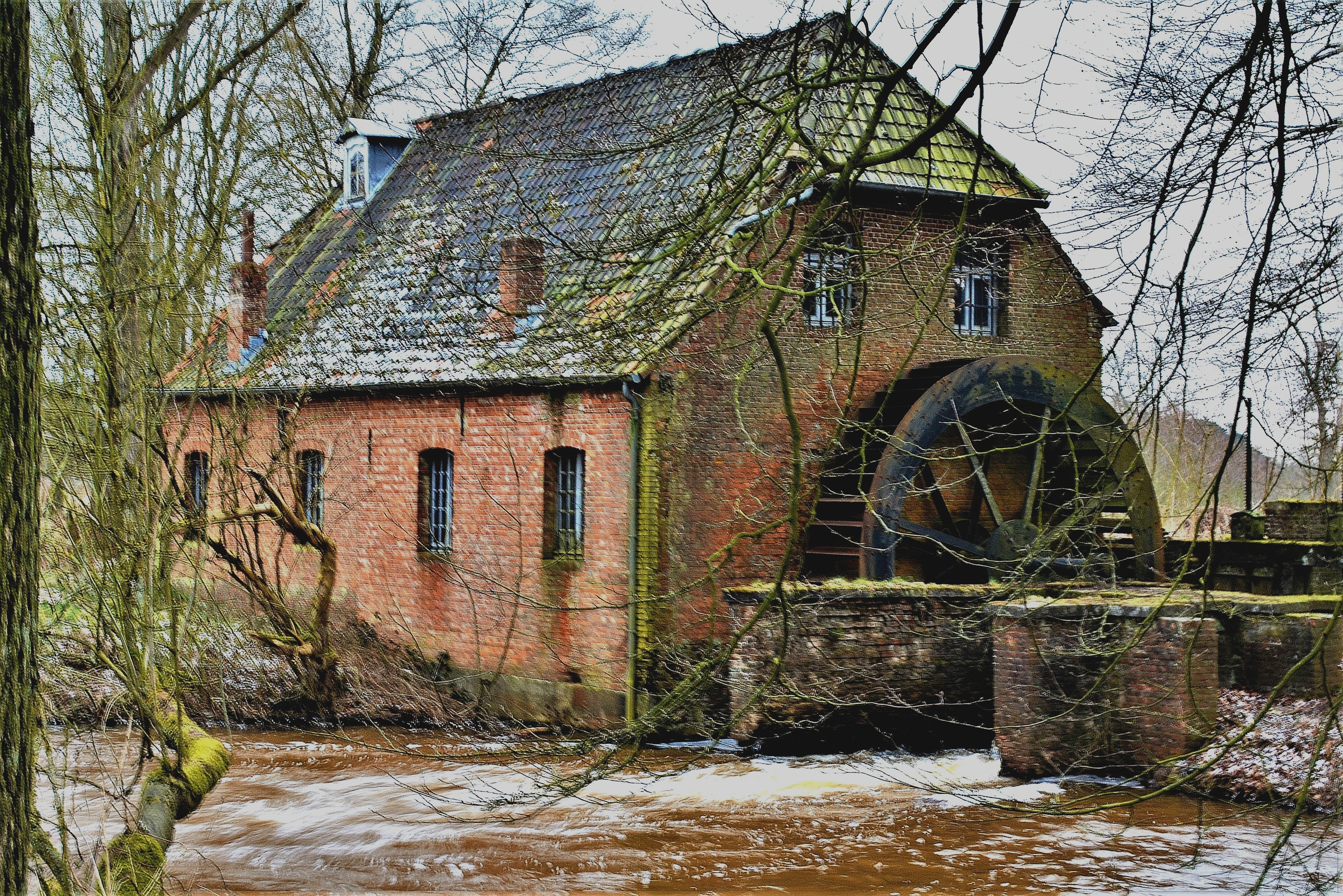
Water mill Hoolstmolen

== Climate ==
Climate data for Balen (1991−2020 normals)
| Month | Jan | Feb | Mar | Apr | May | Jun | Jul | Aug | Sep | Oct | Nov | Dec | Year |
|---|---|---|---|---|---|---|---|---|---|---|---|---|---|
| Mean daily maximum °C (°F) | 6.4 (43.5) | 7.4 (45.3) | 11.3 (52.3) | 15.8 (60.4) | 19.5 (67.1) | 22.3 (72.1) | 24.3 (75.7) | 24.0 (75.2) | 20.4 (68.7) | 15.5 (59.9) | 10.3 (50.5) | 6.8 (44.2) | 15.3 (59.5) |
| Daily mean °C (°F) | 3.4 (38.1) | 3.9 (39.0) | 6.7 (44.1) | 10.0 (50.0) | 13.8 (56.8) | 16.7 (62.1) | 18.8 (65.8) | 18.3 (64.9) | 15.0 (59.0) | 11.1 (52.0) | 6.9 (44.4) | 4.0 (39.2) | 10.7 (51.3) |
| Mean daily minimum °C (°F) | 0.5 (32.9) | 0.3 (32.5) | 2.0 (35.6) | 4.1 (39.4) | 8.2 (46.8) | 11.2 (52.2) | 13.3 (55.9) | 12.5 (54.5) | 9.6 (49.3) | 6.7 (44.1) | 3.5 (38.3) | 1.2 (34.2) | 6.1 (43.0) |
| Average precipitation mm (inches) | 70.1 (2.76) | 64.6 (2.54) | 57.8 (2.28) | 43.4 (1.71) | 59.4 (2.34) | 75.1 (2.96) | 78.5 (3.09) | 78.8 (3.10) | 62.9 (2.48) | 65.4 (2.57) | 74.1 (2.92) | 88.5 (3.48) | 818.6 (32.23) |
| Average precipitation days (≥ 1.0 mm) | 12.9 | 11.8 | 11.2 | 8.7 | 9.7 | 10.2 | 10.6 | 10.9 | 9.8 | 11.0 | 12.9 | 14.2 | 134.0 |
| Mean monthly sunshine hours | 60 | 75 | 131 | 184 | 213 | 213 | 219 | 206 | 159 | 115 | 66 | 50 | 1,691 |
Source: Royal Meteorological Institute
