= Transport in Belgium =

Transportation networks and infrastructure in Belgium

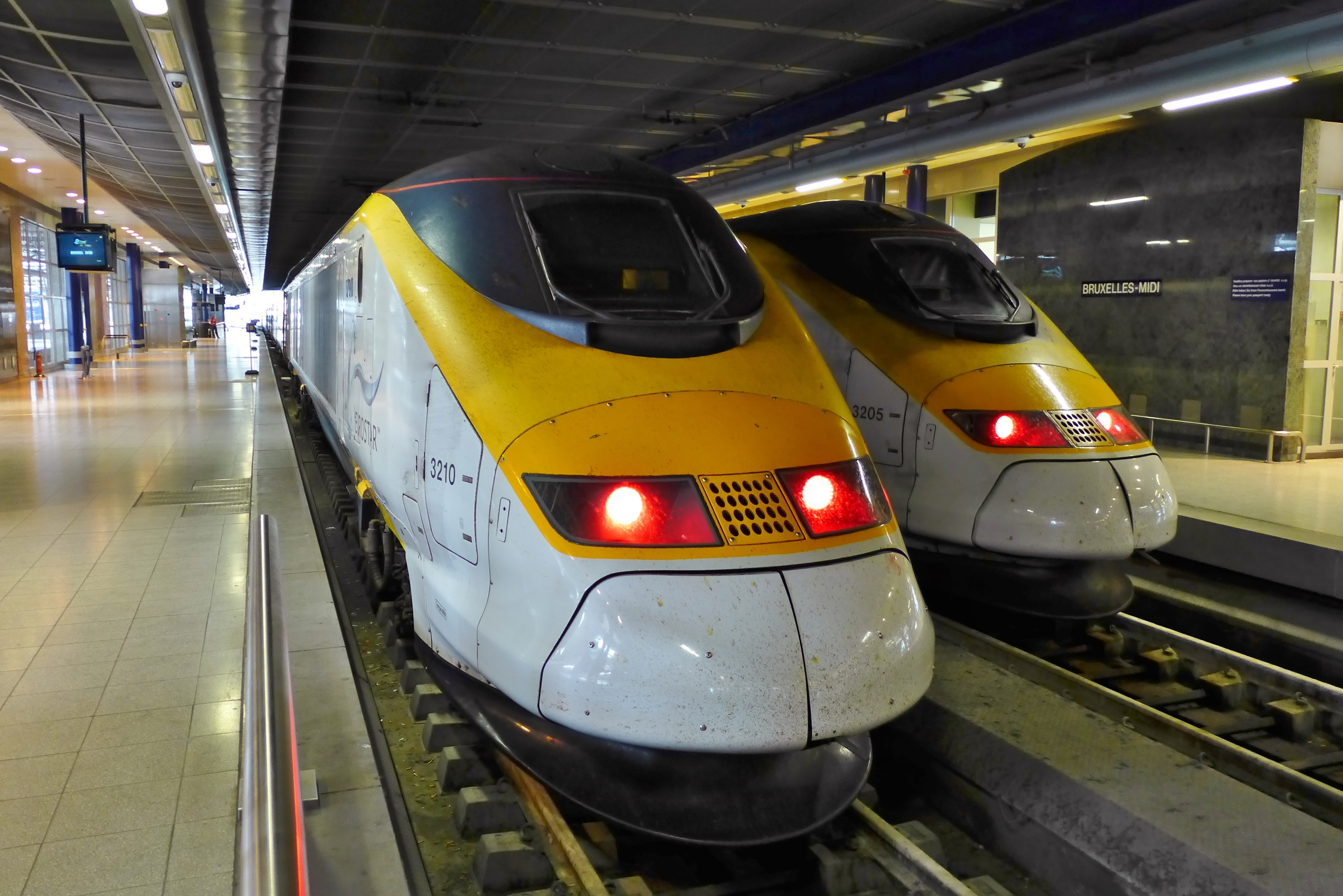
Eurostar trains in Brussel Zuid-Bruxelles Midi station.

Transport in Belgium is facilitated with well-developed road, air, rail and water networks. The rail network has 2,950 km (1,830 mi) of electrified tracks. There are 118,414 km (73,579 mi) of roads, among which there are 1,747 km (1,086 mi) of motorways, 13,892 km (8,632 mi) of main roads and 102,775 km (63,861 mi) of other paved roads. There is also a well-developed urban rail network in Brussels, Antwerp, Ghent and Charleroi. The ports of Antwerp and Zeebrugge are two of the biggest seaports in Europe. Brussels Airport is Belgium's biggest airport.

== Railways ==
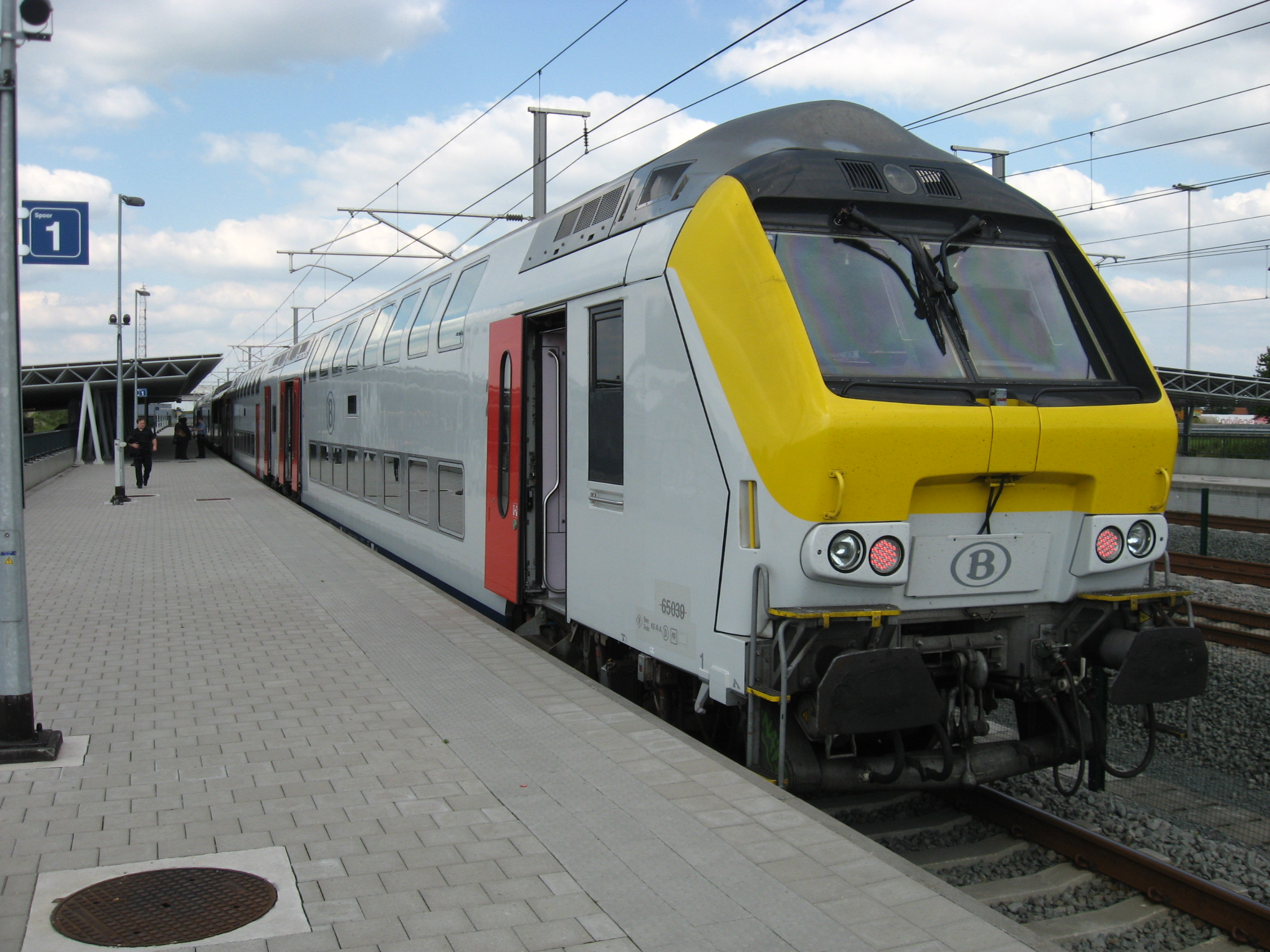
A common Belgian train.

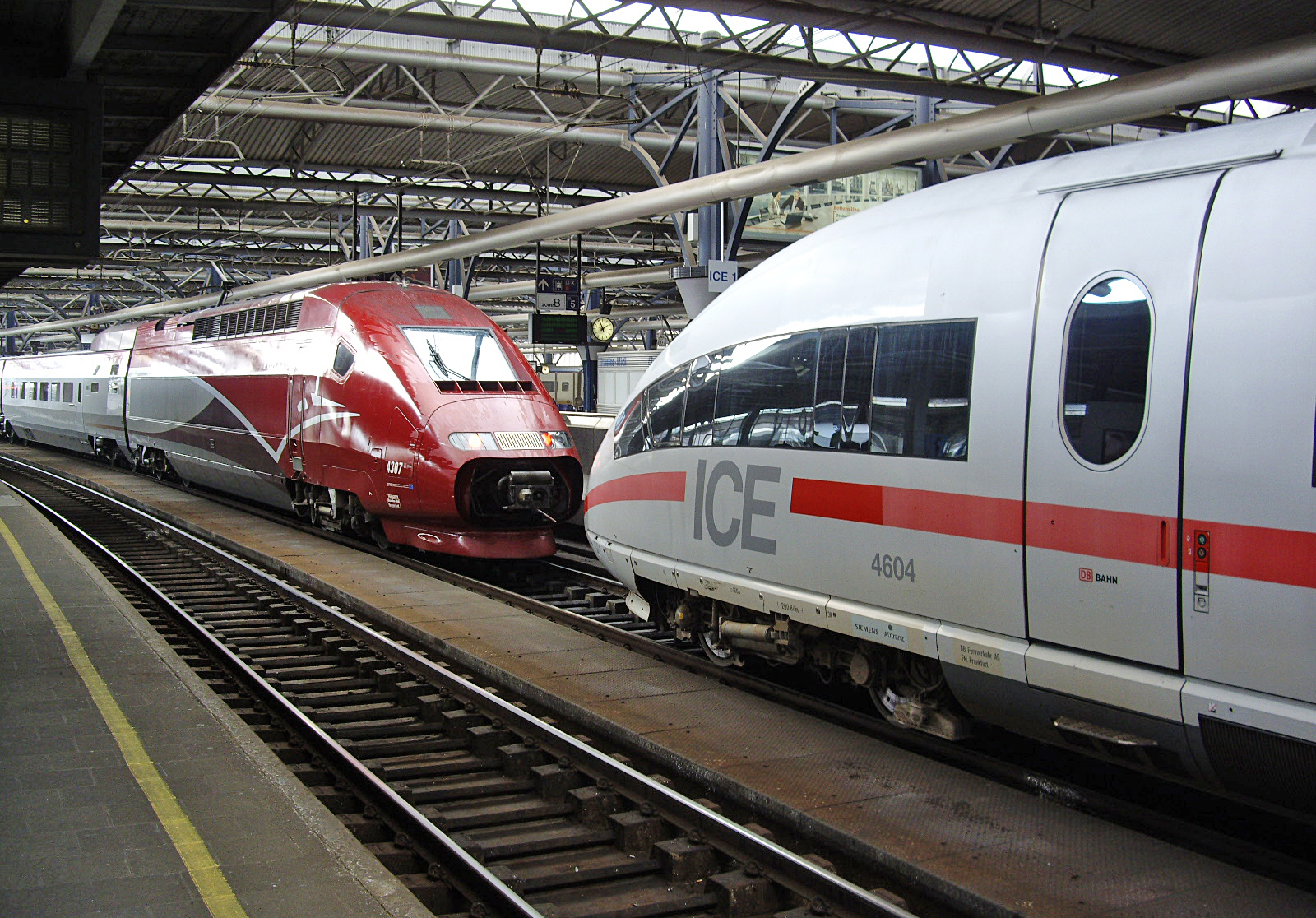
High-speed trains in the Brussels-South railway station.

Rail transport in Belgium was historically managed by the National Railway Company of Belgium, known as SNCB in French and NMBS in Dutch. In 2005, the public company was split into 2 companies: Infrabel, which manages the rail network and SNCB/NMBS itself, which manages the freight and passenger services. There is a total of 3,536 kilometres (2,197 mi), (2,563 km (1,593 mi) double track (as of 1998)), of which 2,950 km (1,833 mi) are electrified, mainly at 3,000 volts DC but with 351 km (218 mi) at 25 kV 50 Hz AC (2004) and all on standard gauge of 1,435 mm (4 ft 8 1/2 in). In 2004 the National Railway Company of Belgium, carried 178.4 million passengers a total of 8,676 million passenger-kilometres. Due to the high population density, operations are relatively profitable, so tickets are cheap and the frequency of services is high. The SNCB/NMBS is continually updating its rolling stock.

The network currently includes four high speed lines, three operating up to 300 km/h (186 mph), and one up to 260 km/h (162 mph). HSL 1 runs from just south of Brussels to the French border, where it continues to Lille, and from there to Paris or London. HSL 2 runs from Leuven to Liège. HSL 3 continues this route from Liège to the German border near Aachen. HSL 4 runs from Antwerp to Rotterdam by meeting HSL-Zuid at the border with Netherlands.

Electrification is at 3 kV DC, with the exception of the new high-speed lines, and of two recently electrified lines in the south of the country which are at 25 kV AC. Trains, contrary to tram and road traffic, run on the left.

=== Rail links with adjacent countries ===
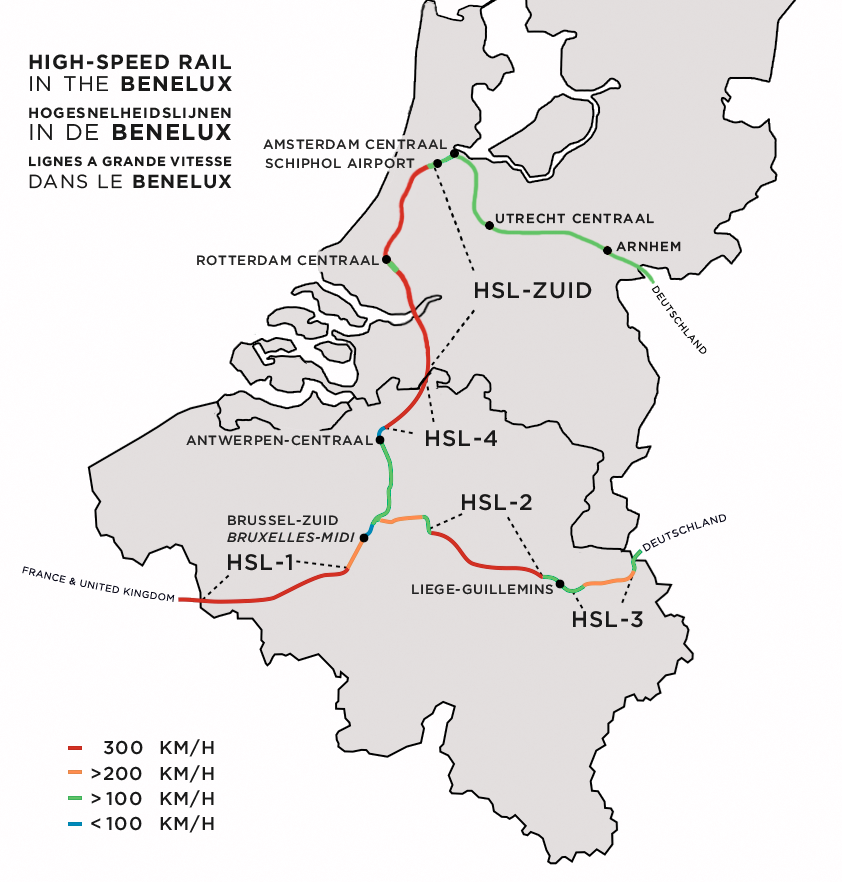
High-speed rail in Belgium and the Netherlands

- France — voltage change 3 kV DC – 25 kV AC
  - LGV 1 — voltage remains at 25 kV AC.
  - via France to the UK on HSL 1, LGV 1, Channel Tunnel and CTRL (Channel Tunnel Rail Link) — voltage remains at 25 kV AC.
- Germany — voltage change 3 kV DC – 15 kV AC
  - HSL 3 — voltage remains at 25 kV AC.
- Netherlands — voltage change 3 kV DC – 1500 V DC
  - HSL-Zuid — voltage remains at 25 kV AC.
- Luxembourg — no voltage change at the border (the line Hatrival (Libramont)-Luxembourg is at 25 kV AC and the line Gouvy-Luxembourg is at 25 kV AC)

=== Urban rail ===
An urban commuter rail network, Brussels RER (French: Réseau express régional Bruxellois, Dutch: Gewestelijk ExpresNet), is operational in the Brussels-Capital Region and surrounding areas.

=== Metros and light rail ===
In Belgium an extensive system of tram-like local railways called vicinal or buurtspoor lines crossed the country in the first half of the 20th century, and had a greater route length than the main-line railway system. The only survivors of the vicinal/buurtspoor system are the Kusttram (covering almost the entire coast from France to the Netherlands, being the longest tram line in the world) and some sections of the Charleroi lightrail system. Urban tram networks exist in Antwerp (the Antwerp Pre-metro), Ghent and Brussels (the Brussels trams), and are gradually being extended. The only rapid transit system in Belgium is the Brussels Metro. Some heavy metro infrastructures were built in Brussels, Antwerp and the Charleroi area, but these are currently used by light rail vehicles, and their conversion to full metro is not envisaged at present due to lack of funds.

Regional transport in Belgium is operated by regional companies: De Lijn in Flanders operates the Kusttram and the Antwerp pre-metro and tram, and the tram in Gent, as well as a bus network both urban and interurban, TEC in Wallonia operates the Charleroi lightrail system as well as a bus network and MIVB/STIB in the Brussels Capital-Region operates the Brussels metro as well as the Brussels tram and bus network. Despite this regional organization, some bus and tram routes operated by STIB/MIVB go beyond the regional border, and some bus routes operated by TEC or De Lijn transport passengers from the Flemish or Walloon regions to the capital city or in the other regions.

== Road transport ==
=== Road network ===
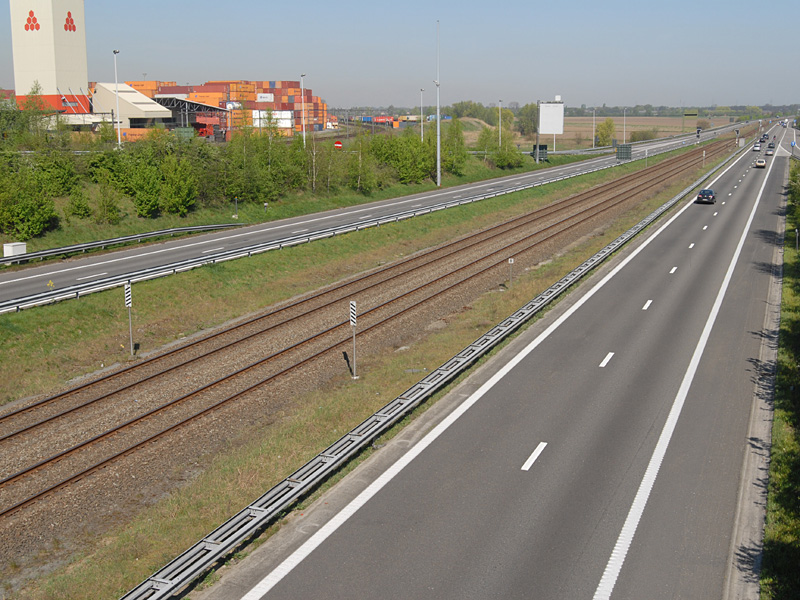
The A12 with a railway in the centre.

The road network in Belgium is managed by regional authorities, meaning that a road section in Flanders is managed by the Flemish Government, a road section in Brussels by the Brussels government and a road section in Wallonia by the Walloon Government. This explains that road signs in Flanders are written in Dutch, even when referring to a Walloon region, and conversely, which can be confusing for foreigners who do not know the different translations of Flemish or Walloon cities in the other language. The road network in Belgium is made of highways, national (or regional) roads (the secondary network) and communal roads (or streets). Communal roads are managed at the municipal level. There are also a number of orbital roads in Belgium around major cities.

- total: 152,256 km (2006)
- country comparison to the world: 35
- paved: 119,079 km (including 1,763 km of expressways)
- unpaved: 33,177 km

Belgian road numbering evolved during the middle decades of the twentieth century, in a relatively inconsistent way. Road number allocations became less systematic during the surge in road building that took place in the 1960s and 70s. Frequently downgraded and deteriorating older national roads retained two digit numbers while newer major roads were identified with less instantly memorable three digit numbers, if only because the shorter numbers were already taken. 1985 saw a comprehensive renumbering of the "N" (National) roads which now followed the scheme described below.

==== Highways ====
Motorways in Belgium

The highways (motorways) in Belgium are marked with a letter A and a number. Most often however the European numbering system for the international E-road network is used. There is however not always a one-on-one relationship between the two numbering systems along the whole length of the highways.

- A1 (E19): Brussels - Antwerp - Breda
- A2 (E314): Leuven - Lummen - Genk
- A3 (E40): Brussels - Leuven - Liège - Aachen
- A4 (E411): Brussels - Wavre - Namur - Arlon - Luxembourg
- A10 (E40): Brussels - Ghent - Bruges - Ostend
- A12 (Brussels - Boom - Antwerp - Netherlands (Bergen op Zoom)
  :(includes a section not yet fully upgraded to motorway standard)
- A13 (E313): Antwerp - Beringen - Hasselt - Liège
- A14 (E17): Lille - Kortrijk - Ghent - Antwerp
- A15 (E42): Charleroi - Namur - Huy - Liège
- A17 (E403): Bruges - Kortrijk - Tournai
- A18 (E40): Bruges - Veurne - Dunkirk

==== Ringways ====
The ringways (or orbital roads) around bigger cities have their own series of numbers. The names start with a R then a first digit indicating the (old) province, and sometimes a second digit to further differentiate in between different ringways.

Some major examples are:

- R0 is the outer ringway around Brussels. The R20 and R22 are (parts of) inner ringways around Brussels.
- R1 is the southern half ringway and R2 is the northern half ringway around Antwerp.
- R3 is the outer ringway and R9 is the inner ringway around Charleroi. The inner ring is counterclockwise-only.
- R4 is the outer ringway and R40 is the inner ringway around Ghent.
- R6 is the outer ringway and R12 is the inner ringway around Mechelen.
- R8 is the outer ringway and R36 is the inner ringway around Kortrijk.
- R23 is the ringway around Leuven.
- R30 is the inner ringway around Bruges.

==== National roads ====
The national roads were renumbered in 1985 according to a national scheme and are identified with the letter N followed by a number.

The principal national roads fan out from Brussels, numbered in clockwise order:

- N1: Brussels - Mechelen - Antwerp
- N2: Brussels - Leuven - Diest - Hasselt - Maastricht
- N3: Brussels - Leuven - Tienen - Sint-Truiden - Liège - Aachen
- N4: Brussels - Wavre - Namur - Marche-en-Famenne - Bastogne - Arlon
- N5: Brussels - Charleroi - Philippeville
- N6: Brussels - Halle - Soignies - Mons
- N7: Halle - Ath - Tournai
- N8: Brussels - Ninove - Oudenaarde - Kortrijk - Ypres - Veurne - Koksijde
- N9: Brussels - Aalst - Ghent - Eeklo - Bruges - Ostend

Secondary national roads intersect these.

National roads have an N plus 1, 2 or 3 digits. National roads numbered with 3 digits are provincial roads, their first number indicating the province in which the road begins:

- N1xx Province of Antwerp
- N2xx Provinces of Flemish Brabant and Walloon Brabant
- N3xx Province of West Flanders
- N4xx Province of East Flanders
- N5xx Province of Hainaut
- N6xx Province of Liège
- N7xx Province of Limburg
- N8xx Province of Luxembourg
- N9xx Province of Namur

=== Cars ===
==== Changes ====
Between 1993 and 2012 the average age of the passengers cars registered as running in Belgium increased from just over 6 years and 4 months to 8 years and 17 days. 2012 data for other European countries are not yet available, but in 2010 the average age of car Belgium was 7.9 years against a European Union average of 8.3 years. Government policy provides an important clue as to one reason for the relative newness of the national car parc. Despite recent high-profile plant closures by Ford and Renault, Belgium remains an important centre for automobile component and passenger car production, with important plants operated by Volvo and Audi, and this is reflected in a relatively benign taxation environment whereby company cars are a still a popular and relatively tax efficient element in many remuneration packages.

== Water ==
=== Ports and harbours ===
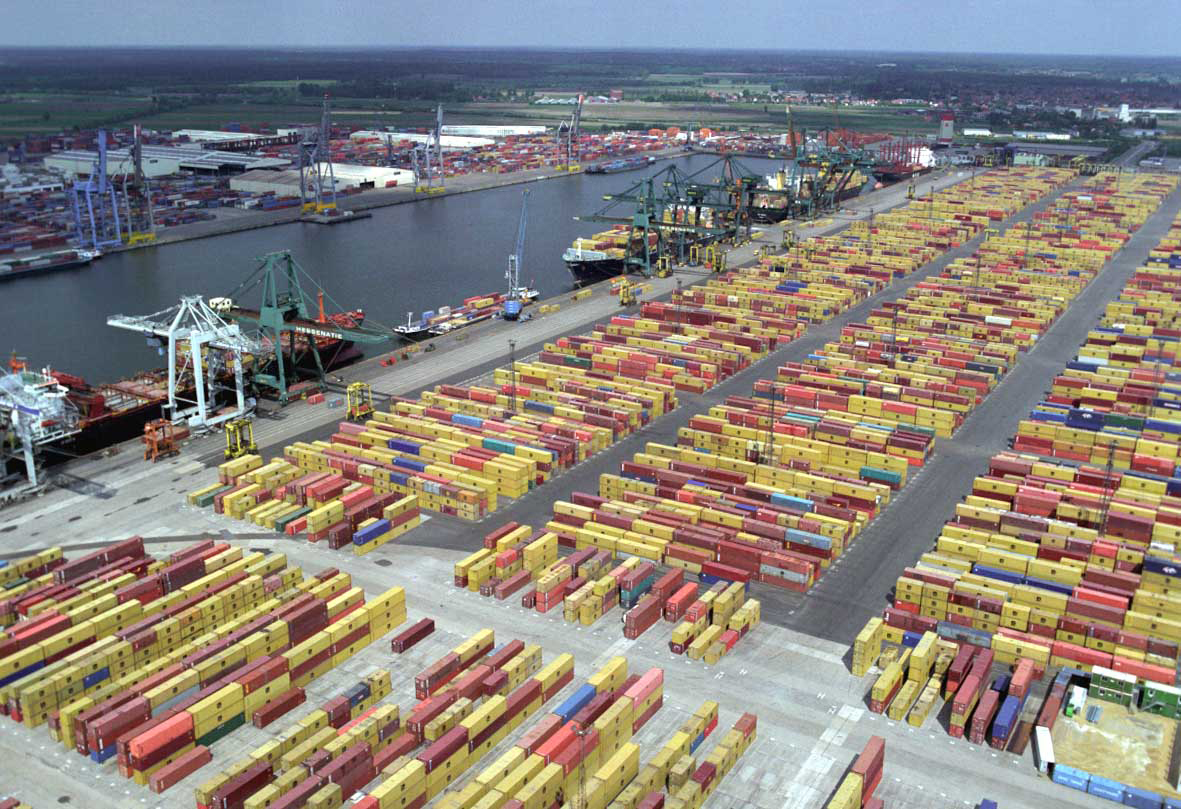
The Port of Antwerp is one of the largest in Europe and the world

==== Sea ports ====
- Antwerp - Port of Antwerp (one of the world's busiest ports)
- Bruges (Zeebrugge) - Port of Bruges-Zeebrugge (one of the busiest in Europe)
- Ghent - Port of Ghent
- Ostend - Port of Ostend

==== Main inland ports ====
Brussels - Port of Brussels (also accessible for ocean-going ships)
Liège - Port of Liège (one of the busiest in Europe)

==== European portuary context ====
European Sea Ports Organisation ESPO
European Federation of Inland Ports FEPI
Inland Navigation Europe INE
2002 ranking of world ports by tonnage and by container volume (in TEU) Port ranking

=== Waterways ===
The Belgian waterway network has 2,043 km, 1,532 km of which is in regular commercial use. The main waterways are:

- the Albert Canal connecting Antwerp to Liège,
- the Ghent–Terneuzen Canal through the port of Ghent connecting Ghent with the Westerschelde,
- the Boudewijn Canal through the port of Bruges-Zeebrugge connecting Bruges with the North Sea,
- the Brussels-Charleroi Canal, Brussels–Scheldt Maritime Canal and Scheldt connecting Charleroi to Antwerp,
- the Nimy-Blaton-Péronnes Canal and Scheldt connecting the Borinage to Antwerp,
- the connection between the North Sea and Antwerp and the connection between Dunkirk and Liège via the Nimy-Blaton-Péronnes Canal,
- the Canal du Centre, the lower Sambre and the Meuse.

Waterways are managed on a regional level in Belgium. The region of Brussels only managed 14 km of waterways from the Anderlecht lock to the Vilvoorde bridge. In Flanders, the management of waterways is outsourced to four companies: NV De Scheepvaart, Departement Mobiliteit en Openbare Werken, Agentschap voor Maritieme Dienstverlening en Kust and Waterwegen en Zeekanaal NV.

== Air transport ==
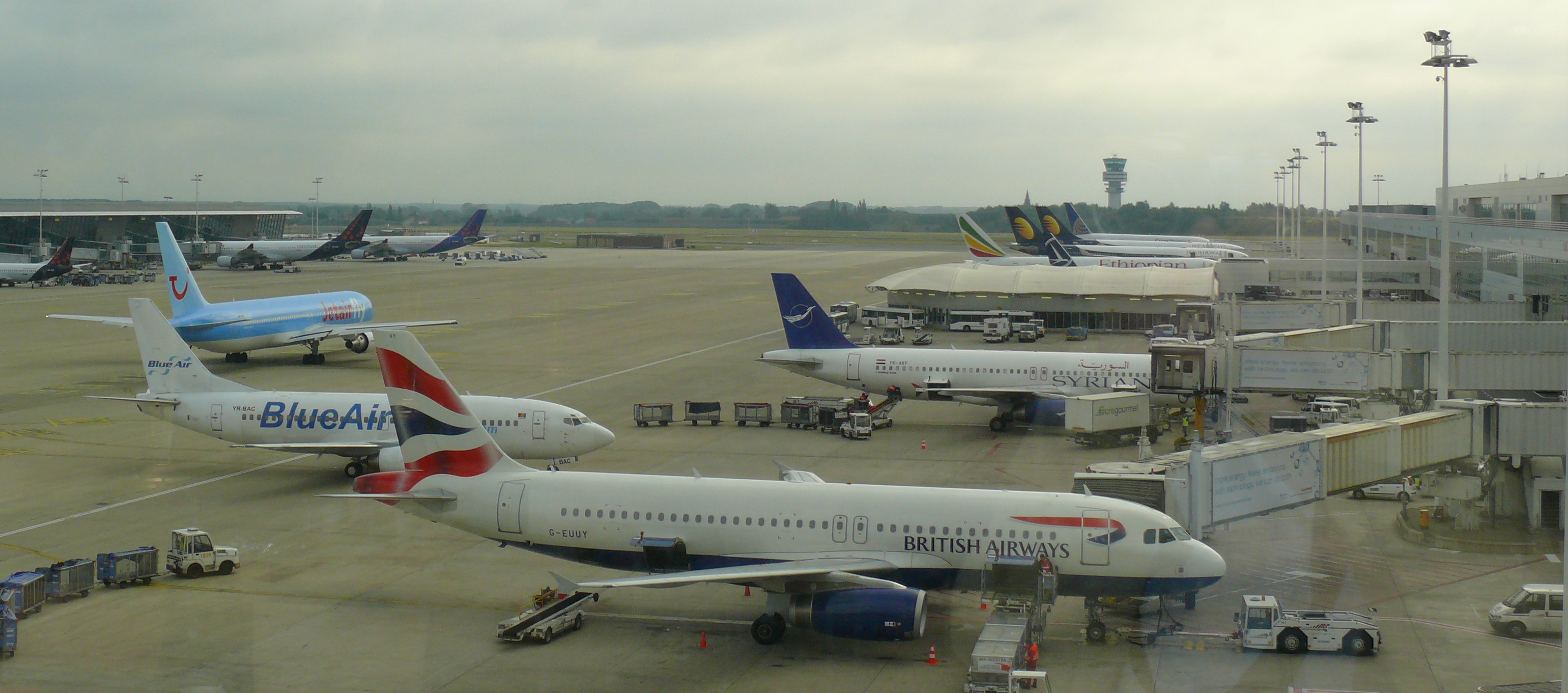
Brussels Airport is the main airport in Belgium.

According to the 2009 CIA World Factbook, there are a total of 43 airports in Belgium, 27 of which have paved runways. Five airports have passenger flights; the largest of these is Brussels Airport. The other four are Ostend-Bruges International Airport, Brussels-South Charleroi Airport, Liège Airport and Antwerp International Airport. Other airports are military airports or small civil airports with no scheduled flights. Well-known military airports include the Melsbroek Air Base and the Beauvechain Air Base.

The Belgian national airline was Sabena from 1923 to 2001, until it went into bankruptcy. A new Belgian airline named SN Brussels Airlines was then founded by businessman Étienne Davignon. The company was then renamed as Brussels Airlines in 2006. In 2016, Air Belgium was founded by Nicky Terzakis, former CEO of TNT Airways, with the goal of connecting Belgium, offering long-haul flights. In 2019, Brussels Airlines became a subsidiary of German airline Lufthansa.

== See also ==
- Transport in France
- Transport in Germany
- Transport in the Netherlands
- List of tunnels in Belgium
- Plug-in electric vehicles in Belgium
