= List of tunnels in Belgium =

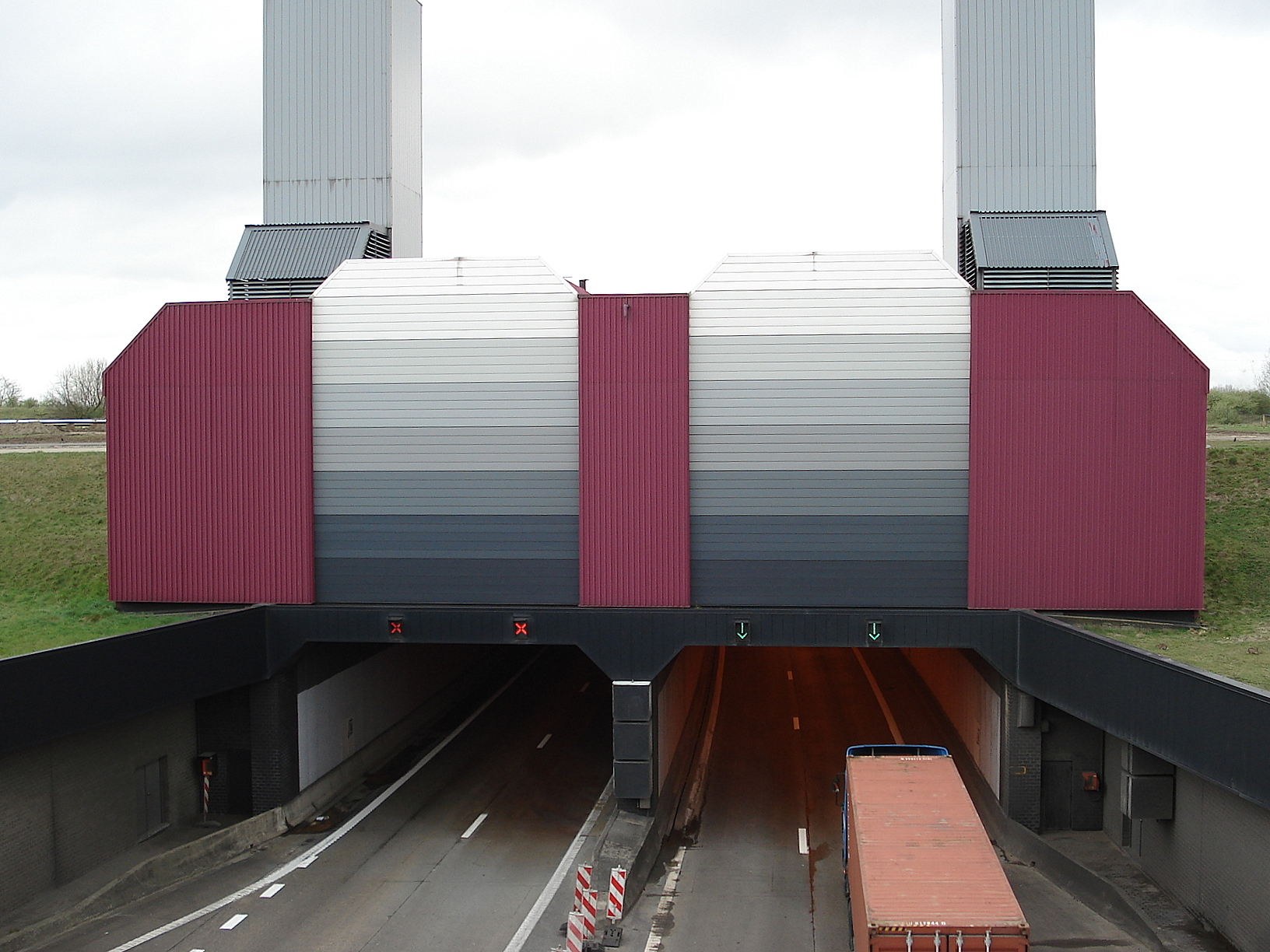
Entrance of the Liefkenshoektunnel

This list of tunnels in Belgium includes any road or waterway tunnel in Belgium. For railway, cycling and pedestrian tunnels, it includes only major (named) tunnels.

== Road tunnels ==
=== Brussels ===
- Arts-Loi/Kunst-Wet Tunnel, R20
- Bailli/Baljuw Tunnel, N24
- Basilique Nord/Basiliek Noord Tunnel, R20
- Basilique Sud/Basiliek Zuid Tunnel, R20
- Belliard Tunnel, N23
- Boileau Tunnel, R21
- Botanique/Kruidtuin Tunnel, R20
- Cinquantenaire/Jubelpark Tunnel, N3
- Delta Tunnel, N210
- Georges-Henri Tunnel, R21
- Kortenberg Tunnel, N23
- Annie Cordy Tunnel, R20
- Loi/Wet Tunnel, N3
- Louise/Louiza Tunnel, R20
- Madou Tunnel, R20
- Montgomery Tunnel, R21
- Porte de Hal/Hallepoort Tunnel, R20
- Porte de Namur/Naamsepoort Tunnel, R20
- Reyers Tunnel, R21-N23-A3
- Rogier Tunnel, R20
- Stéphanie/Stefania Tunnel, N24
- Tervueren/Tervuren Tunnel, N3
- Trône/Troontunnel, R20
- Van Praet Tunnel, R21
- Vleurgat Tunnel, N24
- Woluwe Tunnel, R22

=== Flanders ===
- Waaslandtunnel under the Scheldt, Antwerp
- Kennedy Tunnel, E17 under the Scheldt, Antwerp
- Liefkenshoek Tunnel, R2, Antwerp
- Craeybeckx Tunnel, E19, Antwerp
- Frans Tijsmans Tunnel, R2, Antwerp
- Bevrijdingstunnel, A12, Antwerp
- Jan de Vos Tunnel, A12, Antwerp
- Rupel Tunnel, A12, Boom
- Beveren Tunnel, R2, Beveren
- Ringlaan Tunnel, R31, Ostend
- Tunnel 't Zand, R30, Bruges
- Tunnel Wevelgem, E403, Wevelgem
- Sint-Lievenstunnel, R40, Ghent
- Zelzatetunnel, E34 under Ghent–Terneuzen Canal, Zelzate

=== Wallonia ===
- Tunnel du Bois d'Houtaing, E429
- Tunnel de Rebaix, E429
- Tunnel de Couillet, R3, Charleroi
- Tunnel d'Hublinbu, R3, Charleroi
- Tunnel de Cointe, A602, Liège
- Tunnel de Kinkempois, A602, Liège
- Tunnel des Grosses Battes, A602, Liège

== Cycling and pedestrian tunnels ==
- Sint-Annatunnel (also Voetgangerstunnel), under the Scheldt, Antwerp
- Kennedy Cycling Tunnel, part of bicycle highway FR10 (Ringfietspad), under the Scheldt, Antwerp

== Railway tunnels ==
- Kennedy Rail Tunnel, Antwerp
- Soumagne Tunnel, on the HSL 3 line, east of Liège
- Halle Tunnel, on the HSL 1 in Halle

== See also ==
- List of tunnels by location
