= N1 road (Belgium) =

Road in Belgium

National Route 1
- Dutch: Nationale Weg 1 French: Route nationale 1

Route information
- Length: 73 km (45 mi)

Location
- Country: Belgium
- Major cities: Brussels, Vilvoorde, Mechelen, Antwerp, Brasschaat, Wuustwezel

Highway system
- Highways of Belgium; Motorways; National Roads

The N1 is a national route that connects Brussels with Antwerp and the Dutch border near Wuustwezel.

Like all the nine major routes, the N1 conventionally begins at the Grand-Place (Grote Markt) in central Brussels and leads to the Porte d'Anvers (Antwerpsepoort), on the R20/N0 Small Ring Road. The actual trunk road starts off at Sainctelette Square. From there it follows the Avenue du Port (Havenlaan) and Chaussée de Vilvorde (Vilvoordsesteenweg) to connect with the R21 Second Ring Road at Van Praet. The road continues its way through the Port of Brussels on the Avenue de Vilvorde (Vilvoordselaan) and passes underneath the R0's tall bridge at Vilvoorde.

The N1 then proceeds through Vilvoorde and leaves the agglomeration. Between Vilvoorde and Antwerp the road is called Brusselsesteenweg, Antwerpsesteenweg and Grote Steenweg. It passes through Zemst, crosses the E19 motorway and connects to the R12 Mechelen ring road. From Mechelen the road passes through the municipalities of Sint-Katelijne-Waver, Rumst, Kontich, Hove, Edegem, Mortsel (R11 ring road), Wilrijk and Berchem (R1 motorway and R10 ring road).

From there the N1 enters the city of Antwerp as Mechelsesteenweg and joins the central ring road (Britselei/Frankrijklei/Italiëlei). Leaving Antwerp to the northeast on the Noorderlaan and IJzerlaan, it enters Merksem and continues to Kleine Bareel junction, where it crosses the E19 once again. The final part of the N1 is known as Bredabaan and passes through Brasschaat and Wuustwezel, before crossing the border with the Netherlands near Zundert.

In the Netherlands it ought to continue as National Route 8, but the trunk road system has been declassified long ago, leaving the provincial road number N263.

The total length of National Route 1 is 73 km.

The N1 crosses or borders 15 municipalities. 1 in the Brussels-capital Region, 2 in Flemish Brabant and 11 in the province of Antwerp. A full list of municipalities can be found below. Major municipalities are in bold.

Region	Provinces	Municipality	Population	Length of N1 (km)
Brussels Capital Region	/	**City of Brussels**	188737	4.3
Flanders	Flemish Brabant	**Vilvoorde**	46354	7.1
Flanders	Flemish Brabant	Zemst	23306	5.3
Flanders	Antwerp	**Mechelen**	86996	7.8
Flanders	Antwerp	Sint-Katelijne-Waver	21391	0.7
Flanders	Antwerp	Rumst	15254	3.2
Flanders	Antwerp	Kontich	21340	5.5
Flanders	Antwerp	Hove	8311	1.6
Flanders	Antwerp	Edegem	22386	2.1
Flanders	Antwerp	Mortsel	26189	2.0
Flanders	Antwerp	**Antwerp**	530630	13.9
Flanders	Antwerp	Schoten	34157	1.0
Flanders	Antwerp	**Brasschaat**	38237	9.8
Flanders	Antwerp	Wuustwezel	21523	11.4

== Junction list ==
Province	Municipality	Section	Junction	Northbound destinations	Southbound destinations
(European Union) (Belgium) Brussels capital region	City of Brussels	Brussels	Brussels (188.737 inh.) R21 (Greater Ring) Atomium, Schaerbeek, Etterbeek, Willebroek (A12) N201 Brussels center, Laeken, Brussels-North railway station	Vilvoorde Mechelen Antwerp	Brussels
(European Union) (Belgium) Flanders Flemish Brabant	Vilvoorde	Vilvoorde - Zemst	Vilvoorde (46.354 inh.) N211 Machelen, Brussels Airport, Peutie, Grimbergen R22 (Vilvoorde Ring Road) Vilvoorde-Oost, Machelen, Peutie, Brussels Airport	Mechelen Antwerp	Vilvoorde Brussels
(European Union) (Belgium) Flanders Flemish Brabant	Zemst	Vilvoorde - Zemst	N270 Elewijt Zenne Eppegem (4.579 inh.) N267 Weerde, Boortmeerbeek Zemst (23.306 inh.)	Mechelen Antwerp	Vilvoorde Brussels
(European Union) (Belgium) Flanders Antwerp	Mechelen	Mechelen	B101, E19 Antwerp, Brussels N227 Elewijt Mechelen (86.996 inh.) R12, Mechelen ring road Mechelen, Leuven, Heist-op-den-Berg, Willebroek, Lier, Vilvoorde, Antwerp, Brussels	Mechelen Antwerp	Vilvoorde Brussels
(European Union) (Belgium) Flanders Antwerp	Mechelen	Mechelen	Interruption by R12 (Mechelen ring road) with junctions to N26 (Leuven), N15 (Heist-op-den-Berg), N14 (Lier) and N16 (Willebroek)	Antwerp	Vilvoorde Brussels
(European Union) (Belgium) Flanders Antwerp	Mechelen	Mechelen - Antwerp	R12, Mechelen ring road Mechelen, Leuven, Heist-op-den-Berg, Willebroek, Lier, Vilvoorde, Antwerp, Brussels N16 Willebroek, Dendermonde, Temse, Sint-Niklaas R6 Sint-Katelijne-Waver, Heist-op-den-Berg, Lier, Bonheiden, Antwerp (E19), Brussels (E19)	Antwerp	Mechelen Brussels
(European Union) (Belgium) Flanders Antwerp	Mechelen / Sint-Katelijne-Waver	Mechelen - Antwerp	N1 forms the border between Mechelen and Sint-Katelijne-Waver	Antwerp	Mechelen Brussels
(European Union) (Belgium) Flanders Antwerp	Mechelen	Mechelen - Antwerp	Walem (2.044 inh.) Nete	Antwerp	Mechelen Brussels
(European Union) (Belgium) Flanders Antwerp	Rumst	Mechelen - Antwerp	Rumst (15.254 inh.) N1c Rumst-center, Boom, Antwerp (E19), Brussels (E19)	Antwerp	Mechelen Brussels
(European Union) (Belgium) Flanders Antwerp	Kontich	Mechelen - Antwerp	Waarloos (1.868 inh.) Kontich (21.340 inh.)	Antwerp	Mechelen Brussels
(European Union) (Belgium) Flanders Antwerp	Edegem / Hove	Mechelen - Antwerp	N1 forms the border between Edegem and Hove Edegem (22.386 inh.) Hove (8.311 inh.) N171 Edegem, Kontich	Antwerp	Mechelen Brussels
(European Union) (Belgium) Flanders Antwerp	Mortsel	Mechelen - Antwerp	Mortsel (26.189 inh.) N10 Boechout, Lier, Heist-op-den-Berg, Aarschot R11 Edegem, Wilrijk, Borsbeek, Wommelgem, Wijnegem	Antwerp	Mechelen Brussels
(European Union) (Belgium) Flanders Antwerp	Antwerp	Antwerp	Berchem (42.969 inh.) N173 Edegem, Kontich 4 (Berchem), R1, Antwerp ring road Antwerp, Brussels (E19), Ghent (E17), Bruges (E34), Liège (E313), Netherlands (Eindhoven (E34), Breda (E19), Rotterdam (A12)) R10, Singel Borgerhout, Berchem, Hoboken N155 Berchem, Mechelen (E19), Brussels (E19) Antwerp (530.630 inh.) N113 Hoboken, Wilrijk N184 Borgerhout, Deurne N12 Deurne, Wijnegem, Turnhout N49a Linkeroever, Zelzate (E34), Bruges (E34) R10 Deurne, Borgerhout Albert Canal N101, N180 Port of Antwerp, Ekeren 1 (Merksem), R1, Antwerp ring road Antwerp, Brussels (E19), Ghent (E17), Bruges (E34), Liège (E313), Netherlands (Eindhoven (E34), Breda (E19), Rotterdam (A12)) Merksem (45.119 inh.) N129 Deurne N130 Deurne N115 Schoten	Brasschaat Netherlands (Breda)	Mechelen Brussels
(European Union) (Belgium) Flanders Antwerp	Antwerp / Schoten	Antwerp	N1 forms the border between Antwerp and Schoten	Brasschaat Netherlands (Breda)	Mechelen Brussels
(European Union) (Belgium) Flanders Antwerp	Brasschaat	Brasschaat - Wuustwezel	5 (Kleine Bareel), E19 Antwerp, Netherlands (Breda) N11 Kapellen, Netherlands (Bergen op Zoom) Brasschaat (38.237 inh.) N121 Schoten, Schilde Maria-ter-Heide (4.597) N117 Kalmthout, Essen, Sint-Job-in-'t-Goor	Netherlands (Breda)	Brasschaat Antwerp
(European Union) (Belgium) Flanders Antwerp	Wuustwezel	Brasschaat - Wuustwezel	Gooreind (7.483 inh.) Wuustwezel (21.523 inh.) N133 Brecht, Kalmthout, Essen Braken N144 Loenhout, Hoogstraten	Netherlands (Breda)	Brasschaat Antwerp
(European Union) (Netherlands) (North Brabant)	Continuation by N263 towards Zundert and Breda				

== See also ==
- Transport in Belgium
