= Antwerpen-Noord junction =

Antwerpen-Noord
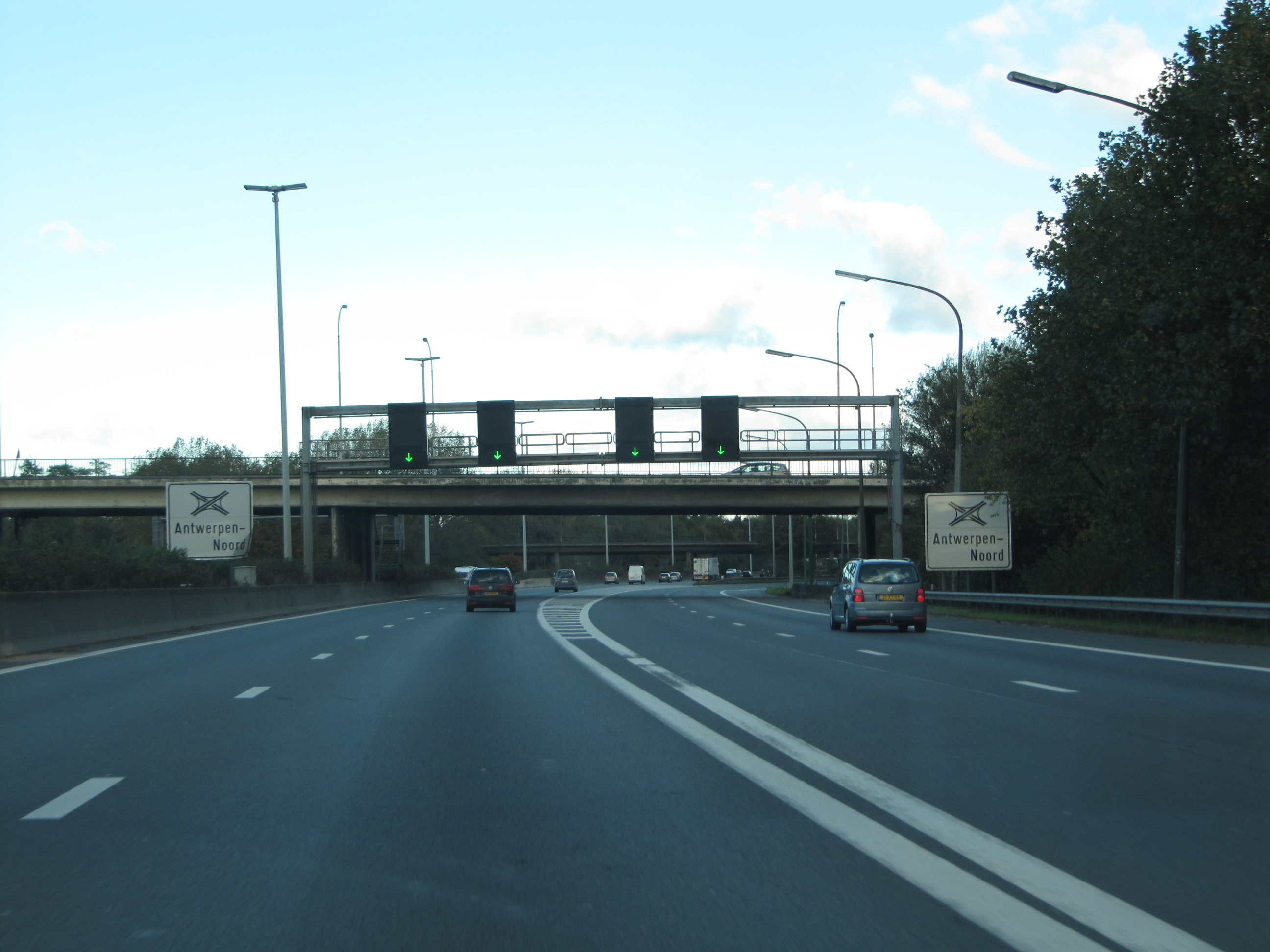
- Antwerpen-Noord on the R1/E19 towards Breda
- Interactive map of Antwerpen-Noord

Location
- Ekeren
- Coordinates: 51°15′47″N 4°26′3″E
- Roads at junction: E19 / A1 – Antwerp, Breda A12 – Antwerp, Bergen op Zoom R1 / E19 – Antwerp

Construction
- Type: 3-way half turbine interchange

Antwerpen-Noord junction (English: Antwerp North) is a highway junction in the northern part of the Antwerp agglomeration, located in the district of Ekeren. The junction lies at the northern end of the R1 ring road around the city of Antwerp, where the R1 connects to the A1/E19 road towards Breda, and the A12 road towards the port of Antwerp and, further to the north, also to the city of Bergen op Zoom.

== Future: A102 outer ringway and Meccano route ==
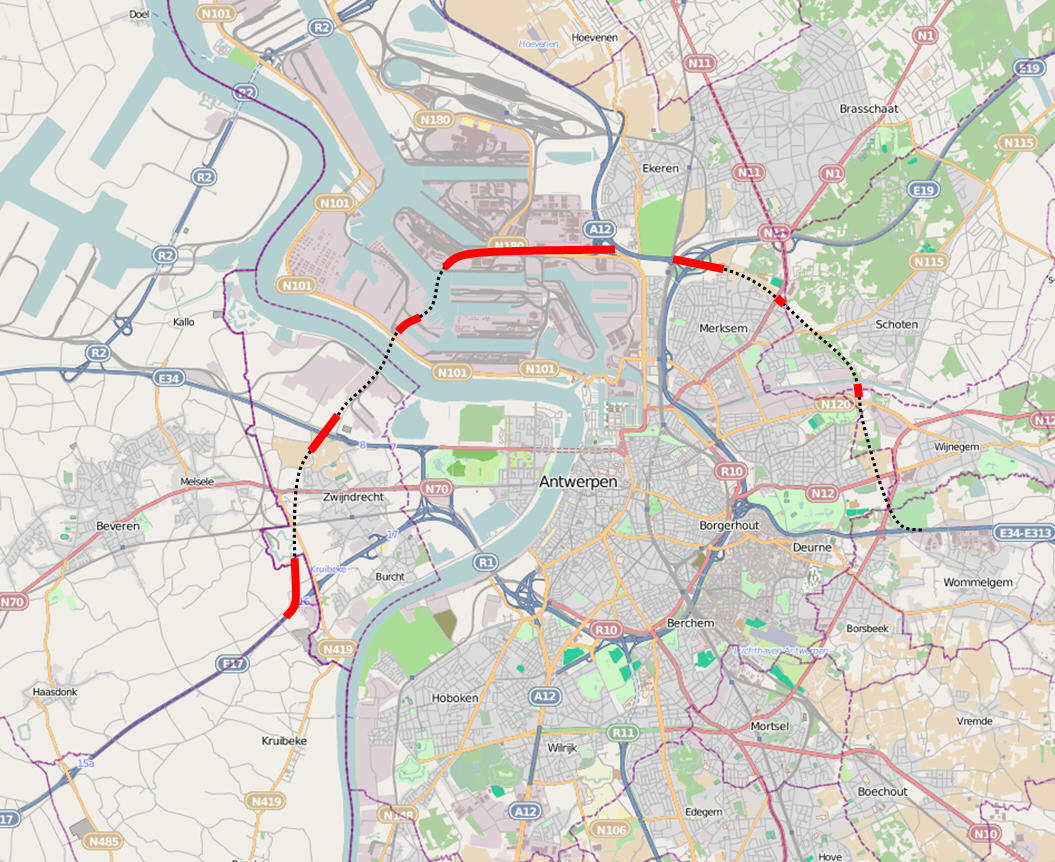
The proposed Meccano route, including the A102 ending at Antwerpen-Noord junction (eastern part)

Since the 1970s, several governments have made plans for the construction of the A102 outer ringway, which would run from Antwerpen-Noord junction to the Wommelgem roundabout junction to the east of Antwerp.

The construction of the A102 has also been promoted by various action groups as part of the Meccano route, an alternative to the new highway tunnel under the river Scheldt called Oosterweel Link, which would make Antwerpen-Noord a five way junction. Official plans for the construction of the road are still being studied, with a compromise launched in February 2017 demanding the combination of the Oosterweel Link and the A102.
