= N9 road (Belgium) =

Road in Belgium

National Route 9
- Dutch: Nationale Weg 9 French: Route nationale 9
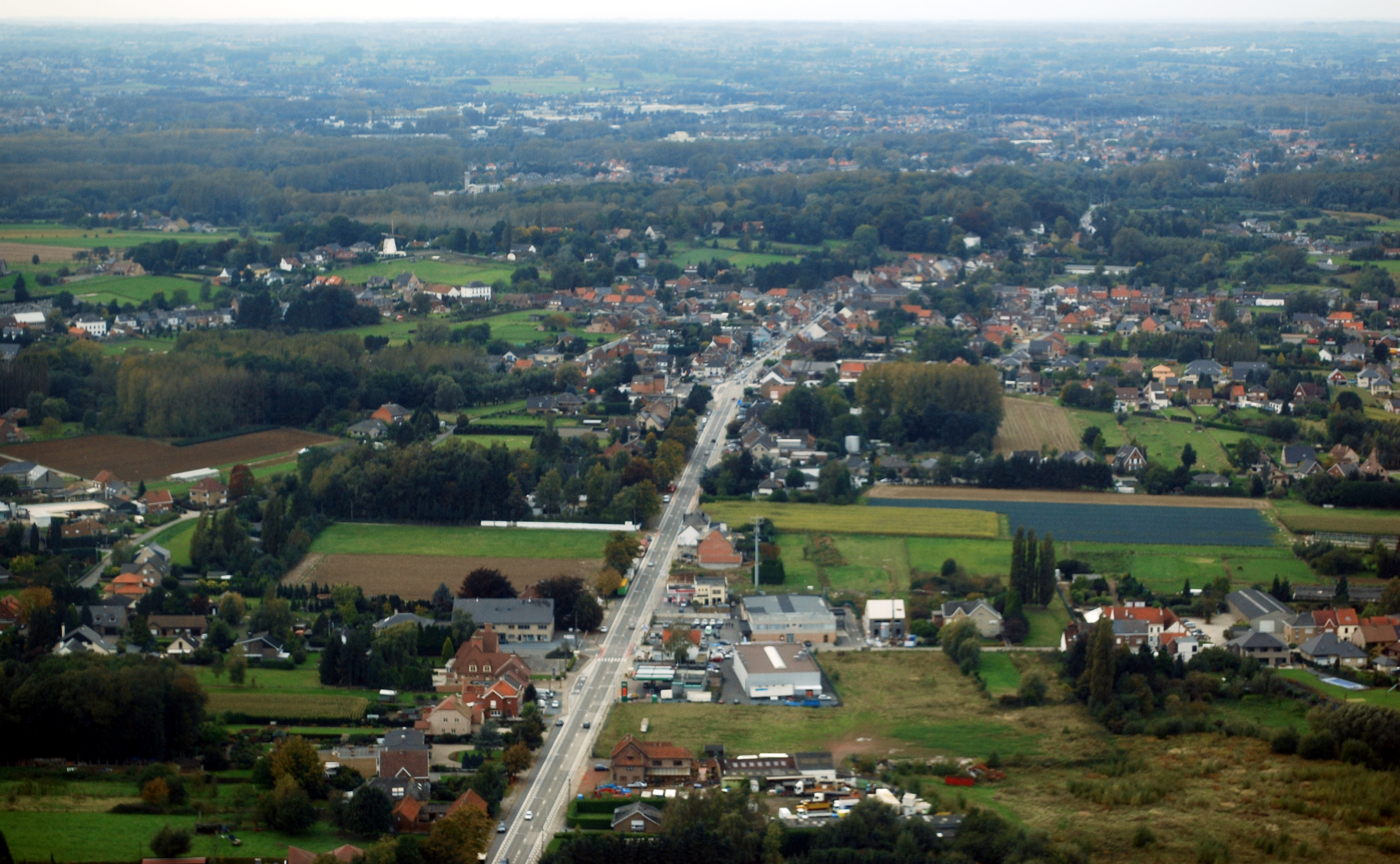
- The N9 near Hekelgem

Route information
- Length: 116 km (72 mi)

Major junctions
- From: Brussels
- To: Ostend

Location
- Country: Belgium
- Major cities: Brussels, Ghent, Bruges

Highway system
- Highways of Belgium; Motorways; National Roads

The N9 road in Belgium is a road connecting Brussels and Ostend, passing Ghent, and Bruges.

== See also ==
- Transport in Belgium
