= Autosnelweg =

Autosnelweg (plural: autosnelwegen) is the Dutch term for motorway or freeway. It is both used in the Netherlands and Belgium, and so it may refer to:

- list of motorways in the Netherlands.
- list of motorways in Belgium.
