= R1 ring road (Belgium) =

Ring R1

Route information
- Maintained by the Roads and Traffic Agency of the Flemish government
- Length: 17 km (11 mi)

Major junctions
- From: Antwerpen-Noord junction
- Antwerpen-Noord junction E19 / A1, A12 1 Merksem N129; Merksem Viaduct; 2 Deurne; N129, N120; Antwerpen-Oost junction E313 / E34 / A13; 3 Borgerhout N184; 4 Berchem N1; Antwerpen-Zuid junction A12, E19 / A1, N155; 5 La Grellelaan N150; Antwerpen-Centrum junction A122; 5a Het Zuid N113; Kennedytunnel; 6 Linkeroever N70; Antwerpen-West junction E17 / A14 7 Sint-Anna Linkeroever E34 / A11 N49a
- To: Sint-Anna Linkeroever

Location
- Country: Belgium

Highway system
- Highways of Belgium; Motorways; National Roads

The R1 is the ring road around the city of Antwerp, Belgium.

The ring road is not complete; however, its completion is planned with the long running proposed construction of the Oosterweel Link which would cross the Scheldt river. The existing Scheldt crossing is via the Kennedy Tunnel.

The road is largely built on the area of the former Brialmont Fortress around the city of Antwerp, which was constructed between 1859 and 1863.

In the course of planning the procurement of the construction works, the Flemish authorities raised several queries with the European Commission, intending to ensure that their plans did not conflict with EU public procurement law. One query related to their proposal to award a concession contract, without market consultation, to SA Tunnel Liefkenshoek for the construction and operation of a new link from the River Scheldt to Antwerp, in reply to which it was confirmed that the proposed concession was "unlikely to give rise to problems of compatibiloty with European public procurement law".

In order to diminish particulate matter and noise disturbance, the non-governmental organization Ringland has demanded that the ring road should be fully roofed.

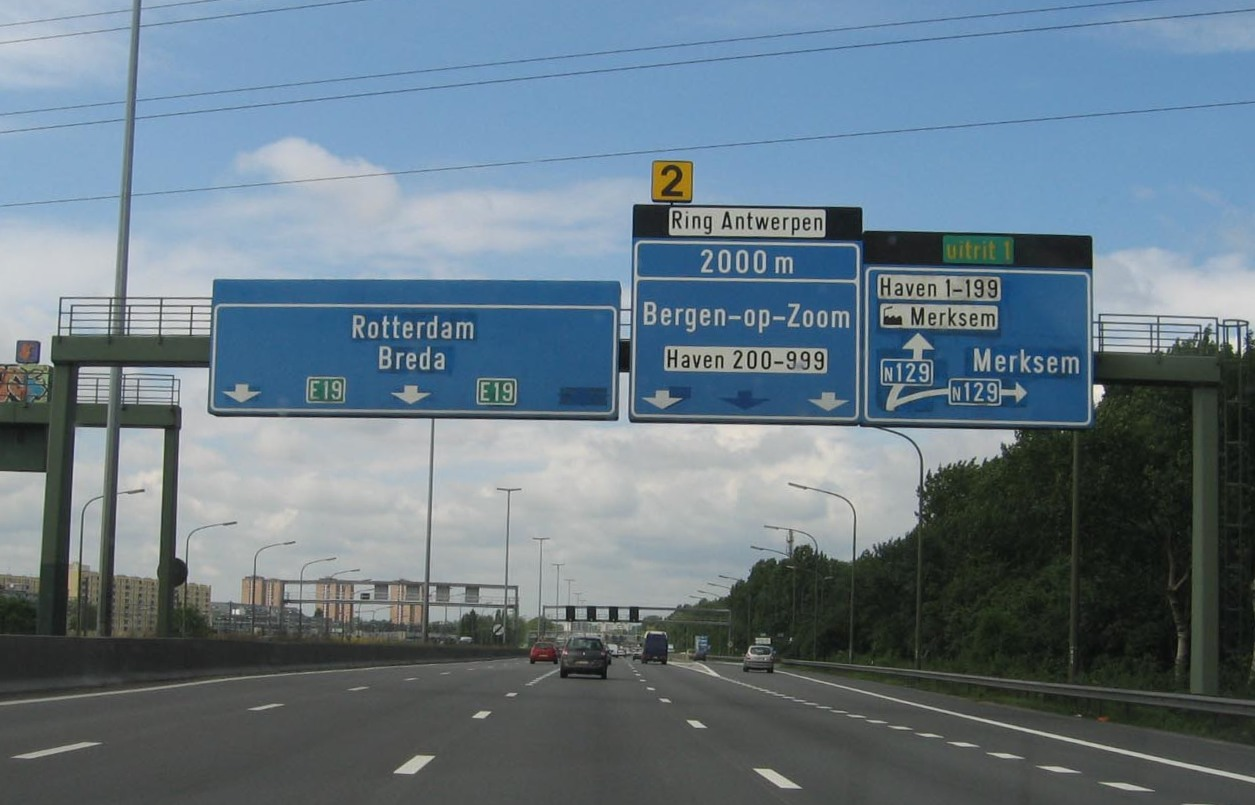
Antwerp ring road

== See also ==
Liefkenshoektunnel
