= A16 motorway (Belgium) =

Relatively short Belgian motorway connecting Mons and Tournai

Coordinates: 50.536563°N 3.594289°E

A16
- Dutch: Autosnelweg 16; French: Autoroute 16

Route information
- Length: 35 km (22 mi)

Location
- Country: Belgium

Highway system
- Highways of Belgium; Motorways; National Roads

The A16 is a relatively short Belgian motorway connecting Mons and Tournai. It is an important European-Motorway between Belgium, Germany, France and the United Kingdom.
