= Machelen =

- Municipality
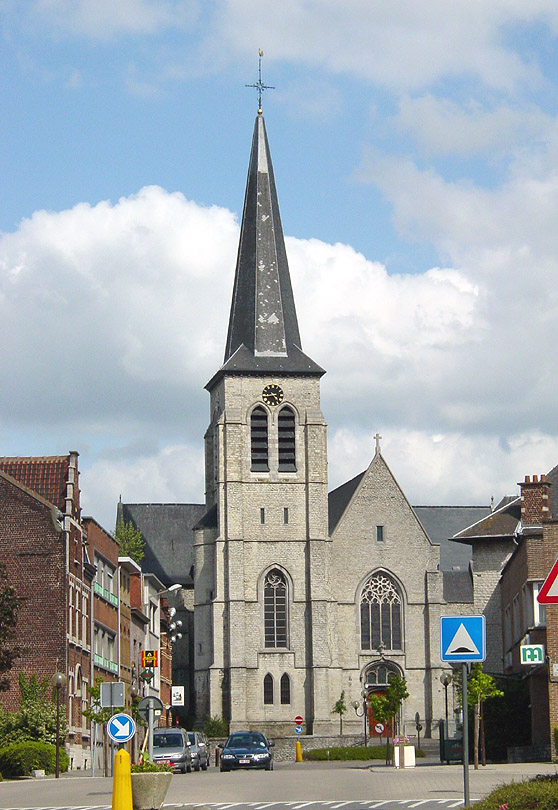
- St. Gertrudis church in Machelen

- Flag Coat of arms

- Location of Machelen in Flemish Brabant
- Interactive map of Machelen
- Location in Belgium
- Coordinates: 50°55′N 04°26′E
- Country: Belgium
- Community: Flemish Community
- Region: Flemish Region
- Province: Flemish Brabant
- Arrondissement: Halle-Vilvoorde

Government
  - Mayor: Jean Pierre De Groef (Vooruit)
  - Governing parties: Samen Vooruit, N-VA

Area
  - Total: 11.5 km^{2} (4.4 sq mi)

Population (2018-01-01)
  - Total: 15,417
  - Density: 1,340/km^{2} (3,470/sq mi)
- Postal codes: 1830, 1831
- NIS code: 23047
- Area codes: 02
- Website: www.machelen.be

Machelen (Dutch pronunciation: [ˈmɑxələ(n)]) is a municipality in the province of Flemish Brabant, in the Flemish region of Belgium. The municipality comprises the towns of Diegem and Machelen proper. On 1 January 2006, Machelen had a total population of 12,500. The total area is 11.59 km^{2} (4.47 sq mi), which gives a population density of 1,078/km^{2} (2,790/sq mi). The official language of Machelen is Dutch, as in the rest of Flanders. A suburb of Brussels, Machelen directly borders the Brussels-Capital Region, specifically the Haren neighbourhood.

A portion of Brussels Airport is located in Diegem, together with neighbouring town of Zaventem. The municipality contains three major road junctions: the intersection of the Brussels Ring (R0) and A201 serving the airport (labelled Zaventem), the start of the A1 towards Mechelen and Antwerp fed by the ring road, and the first junction on the A1 meeting the N211 feeder road from Vilvoorde, also accessing the airport. Buda railway station (on Belgian railway line 25) serves part of the area, although only Service S1 stops there, other routes using Vilvoorde railway station further north.

== Economy ==
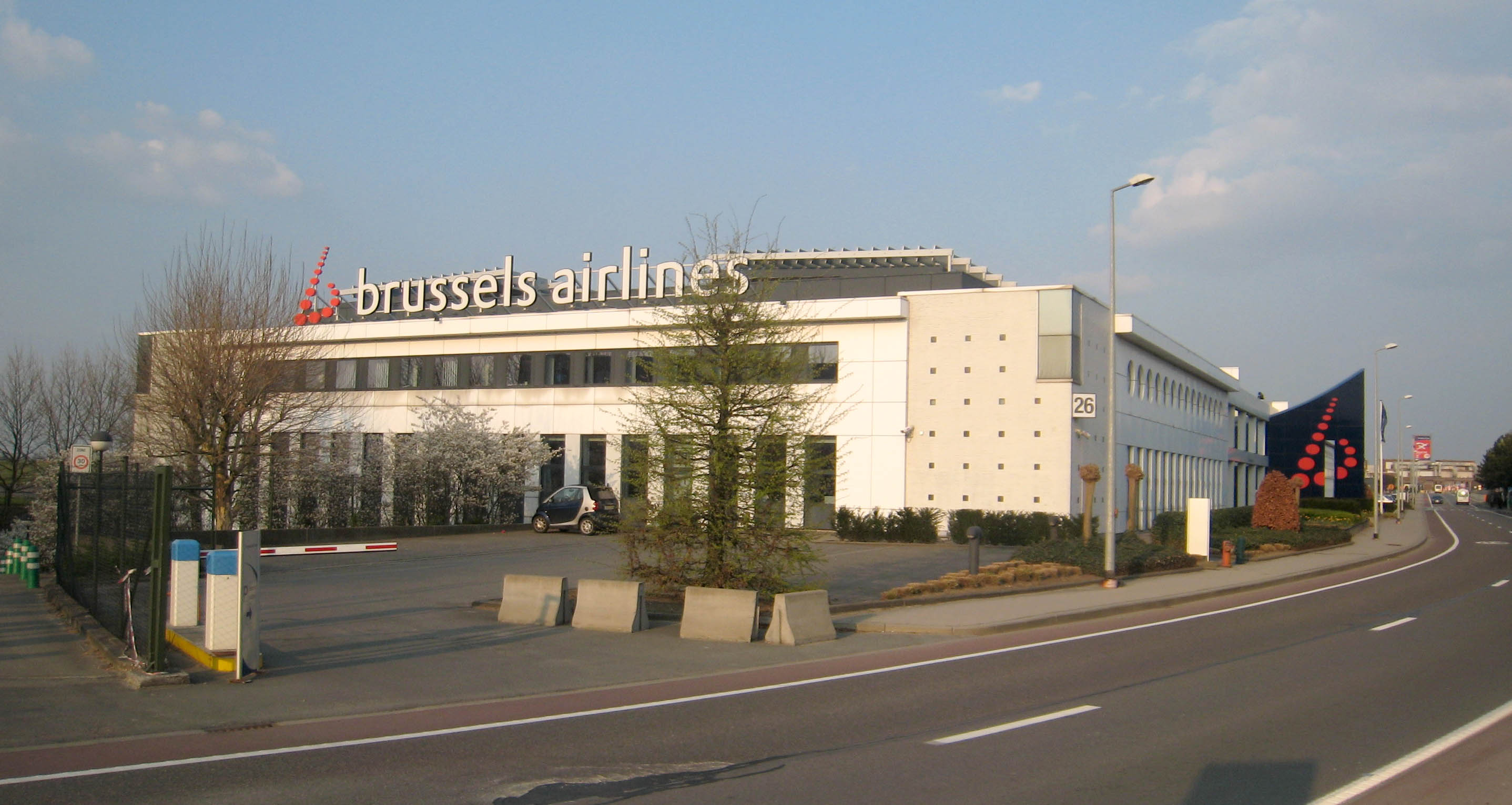
Brussels Airlines head office in Diegem, Machelen

Brussels Airlines has its corporate headquarters in the b.house on the grounds of Brussels Airport and in Diegem, Machelen. Brussels Airlines formed in 2006 as a result of a merger between SN Brussels and Virgin Express.

The Europe, Middle East, and Africa operations of Chevron Phillips are based in Stockholm Building in Airport Plaza in Diegem.

== Education ==
Primary schools include:

- Gemeentelijke Basisschool De Fonkel (Diegem)
- Basisschool De Sterrenhemel
- Vrije Basisschool De Windroos
- Parochiale Basisschool (Diegem)

GISO Machelen provides secondary education.

Bibliotheek Machelen-Diegem is the public library of the town.
