= R3 (ring road) =

Ring road of Charleroi, Belgium

Ring R3

Route information
- Length: 33 km (21 mi)

Location
- Country: Belgium

Highway system
- Highways of Belgium; Motorways; National Roads

The R3 is a ring road around the city of Charleroi, Belgium. It is about 33 km long, with 2 lanes in each direction on most of its length and short sections with 2 + 3 lanes. While Charleroi is one of only few Belgian cities with a complete ring road, the R3 road only covers the western, southern and eastern portions of the ring, the northern part being covered by the A15 motorway.

The speed limit is 120 km/h (75 mph) on the entire length, except in some tunnels and on the Couillet viaduct, where the limit is lower.

== History ==
The R3 was opened in phases from 1983 till 1988.

- 1983: Châtelineau - Heppignies.
- 1984: Marcinelle (Hublinbu) - Châtelineau.
- 1985: Gouy-lez-Piéton - Trazegnies.
- 1987: Fontaine l'Evêque - Montigny-le-Tilleul.
- 1988: Trazegnies - Fontaine l'Evêque.

== Course and exit list ==
Municipality	Km.	Exit	Name	Roads	Notes
Courcelles	32.7		Gouy-lez-Piéton	A15 / E42	
Courcelles	30.4	1	Trazegnies	N583	
Fontaine-l'Évêque	26.1	2	Forchies-la-Marche	N569	
Fontaine-l'Évêque	22.6	3	Fontaine-l'Évêque	N54 / N90	
Montigny-le-Tilleul	Landelies viaduct				
Montigny-le-Tilleul	19.2	4	Montigny-le-Tilleul	N579	
Montigny-le-Tilleul	Montigny-le-Tilleul viaduct				
Charleroi	17.4	5	Mont-sur-Marchienne	N53	
Charleroi	16.0		Marcinelle	A503	
Charleroi	14.6	6	Marcinelle-Est	Rue Chèvrefeuille	
Charleroi	13.5	7	Marcinelle-Hublinbu	Avenue des Tilleuls	Access to clockwise direction only. Exit from counter-clockwise direction only.
Charleroi	Hublinbu tunnel (speed limit: 100 km/h (62 mph))				
Charleroi	12.5	8	Couillet	N5 / N572 / E420	Access to clockwise direction only. Exit from counter-clockwise direction only.
Charleroi	Couillet viaduct (speed limit: 100 km/h (62 mph))				
Charleroi	Couillet tunnel (speed limit: 80 km/h (50 mph))				
Châtelet	10.7	9	Blanche-Borne	Rue de la Blanche-Borne	
Châtelet	9.0	10	Châtelet	N576	
Châtelet	Châtelet viaduct				
Châtelet	6.6	11	Châtelineau	N569	
Charleroi	5.7	12	Gilly	N90	
Charleroi	3.5	13	Soleilmont	N587	
Fleurus	0.0		Heppignies	A15 / E42	
Fleurus	−0.7	14	Heppignies	N568	
