= Diabolo project =

Railway construction project

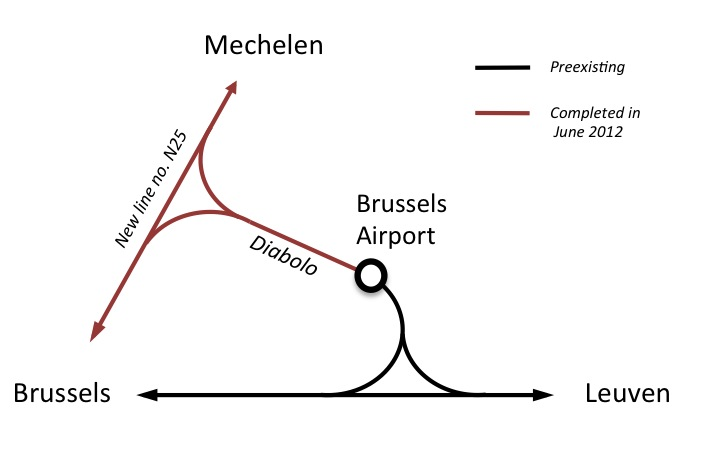
Diabolo project

The Diabolo project created a new railway line serving Brussels National Airport.

It is so called because of its shape, resembling a Chinese yo-yo: the line forms a chord between the Brussels-Leuven line 36 going east and the new Brussels-Antwerp line 25N going north, and connects with them via a triangular junction at each end. Its addition to the network permits a much more flexible airport railway service to be provided: as well as mainline trains going north and east, future high-speed services between London, Paris, Amsterdam and Cologne could call there. This would make Brussels National Airport a fully-fledged international railway station on the model of Amsterdam's Schiphol or Paris' Charles de Gaulle.

Before the project, the airport had another station, a terminus, linked only to the Brussels-Leuven line with a single track and only connecting to/from Brussels. The outline of track can still be seen on maps and satellite images, it entered the airport terminal from the west. It was constructed (with the rest of the terminal) for the 1958 world exposition.

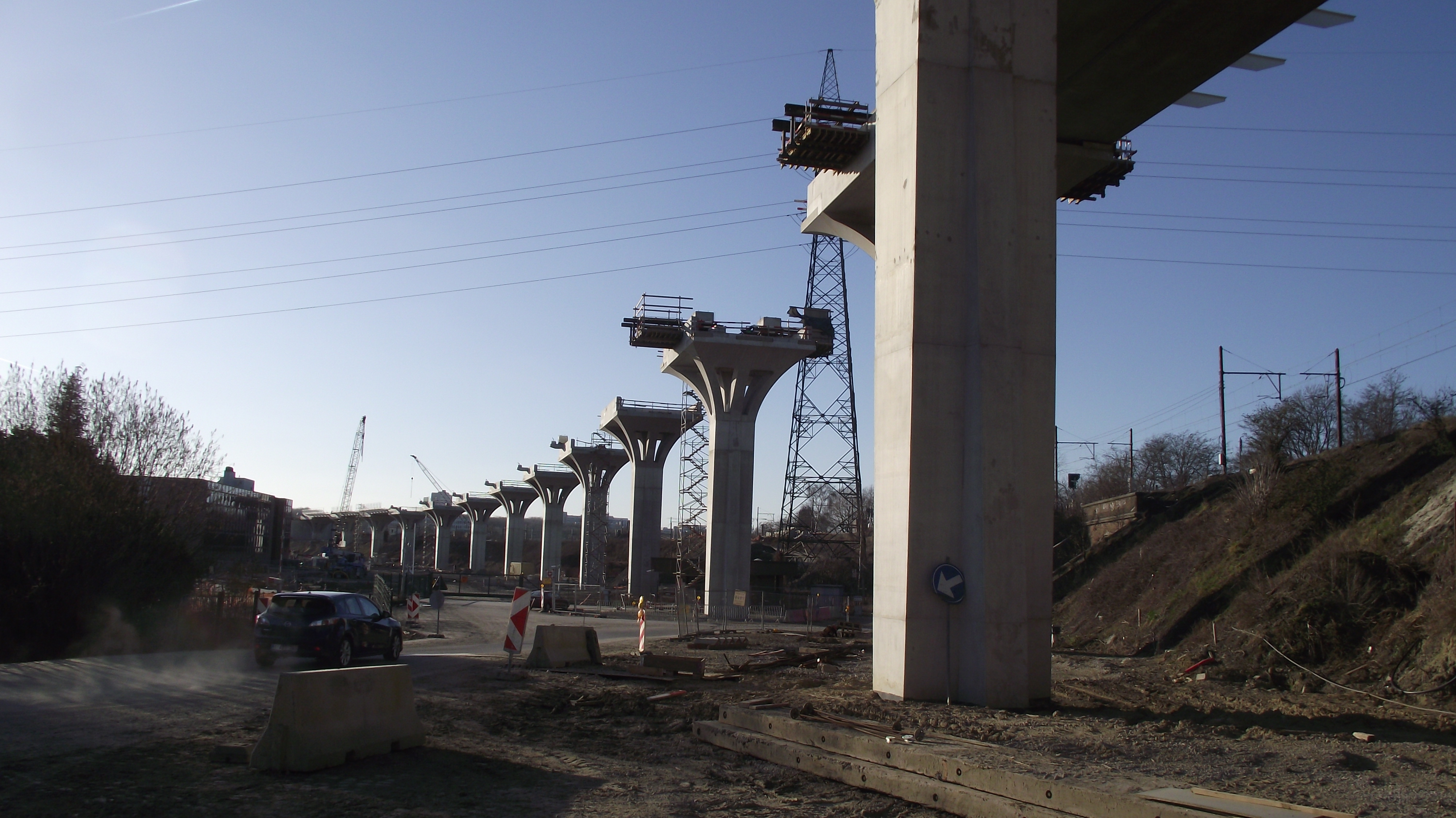
Viaduct near Haren, some of the last major works needed for line 25N

The connection from the airport station to the new line was built by SA Diabolo in a Public Private Partnership. SA Diabolo will maintain and rent the infrastructure to Infrabel for 35 years. In 2045 it will sell to Infrabel for 1 Euro. The three platforms of the existing railway station were extended to allow Intercity trains. Just under 3 km of line runs with slab track through a combination of cut and cover double track and single bore tunnels connecting to the 25N line in both directions at a flyover junction.

The 25N line was built by Infrabel along the exceptionally broad (40m) central reservation of the A1/E19 motorway from Schaerbeek/Schaarbeek to the new Mechelen station. It was built for 220 km/h operation and equipped with TBL1+ and ETCS level 1 signaling.

The bridge span connecting it to the existing line at the northern end was placed in May 2009 and the tunnel into the airport at the southern end has been dug. The line was officially opened as planned on Friday, 8 June 2012 by King Albert. The first train from Mechelen to the airport ran on 10 June 2012 with a journey time of 8 minutes in place of the previously required 40 minutes. The completion of the Diabolo project and the Schuman-Josaphat tunnel are key infrastructure components needed for the rationalization of Brussels suburban rail services into the Brussels GEN/RER, whose stepwise inauguration is planned between 2015 and 2025.

To fund the project and the operation of the line, a surcharge (currently €6.90) is charged on most train tickets to and from Brussels Airport station. Ticket gates at the station require a 2D barcode to be scanned to permit entrance or exit.

In the Infrabel inventory, the line is called 36C, making it a dependency of line 36.
