= Kennedytunnel =

Road and rail tunnel near Antwerp, Belgium

Coordinates: 51.206°N 4.371°E

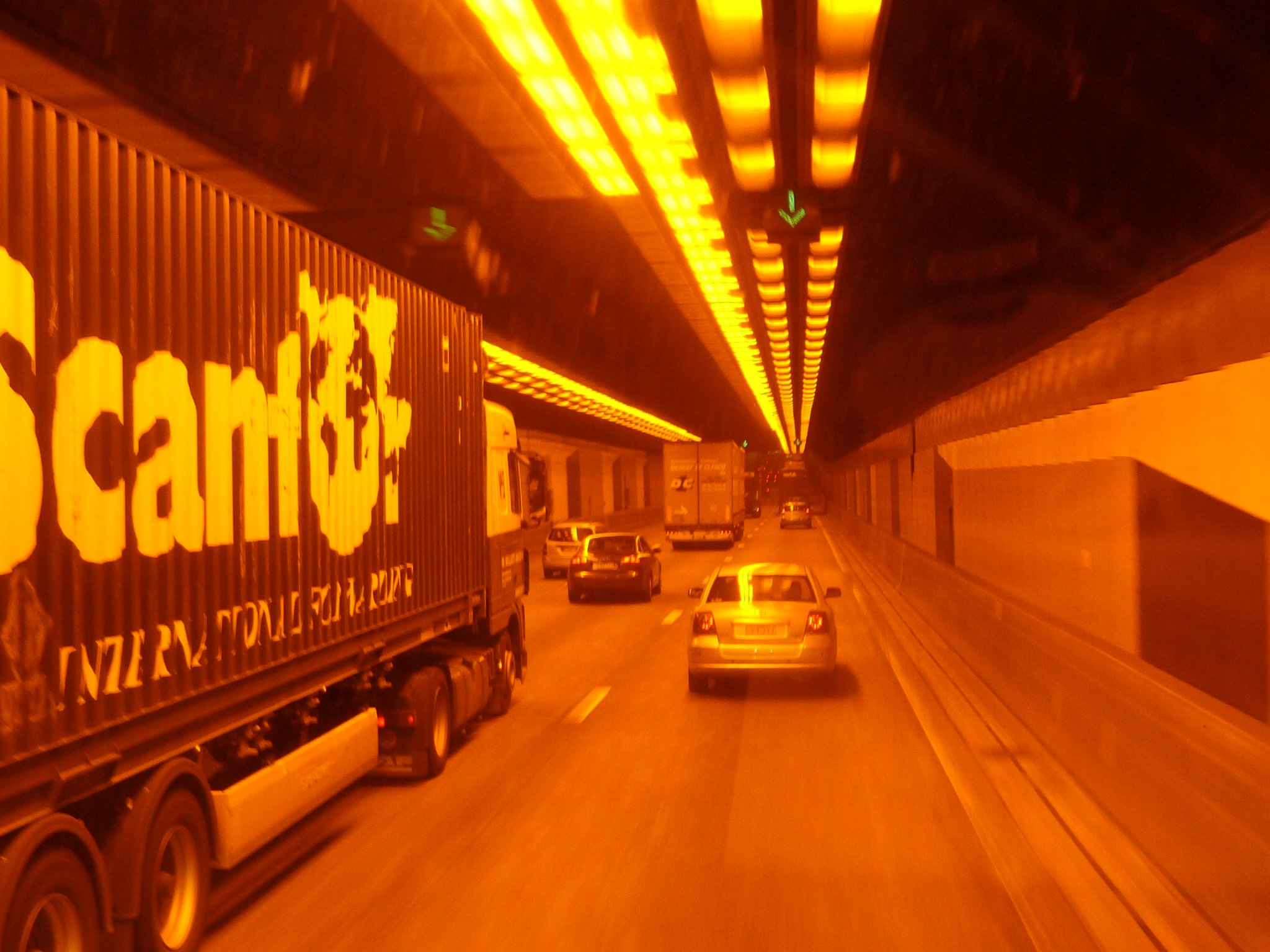
- Daily, more than 250,000 vehicles drive through the Kennedy Tunnel.

Overview
- Location: Antwerp
- Status: In use
- Route: R1 ring road (Belgium)

Operation
- Opened: 1969
- Traffic: cars, trains, bicycles
- Toll: no

Technical
- Length: 590 m
- Width: 14.25 m

The Kennedytunnel is an important road, rail, and bicycle tunnel to the south of Antwerp, Belgium, under the Scheldt river. The road tunnel forms a part of Highway R1 – the not yet completed inner ring motorway surrounding the city. Opened to road traffic on 31 May 1969, and to rail traffic on 1 February 1970, the tunnel was named after John F. Kennedy, the thirty-fifth President of the United States.

Plans for the construction of the tunnel date back to the Fifties. Between 1945 and 1960, the volume of traffic passing through the Waaslandtunnel had quintupled – in excess of 38,000 vehicles were travelling through the tunnel per day. Because of the resulting daily congestion on both sides of the river crossing, the construction of a second crossing was deemed necessary.

In 1958 the layout for the E3 was established, and an invitation to tender was issued for a bridge or a tunnel. In 1963, Minister Georges Bohy, following the advice of his technical experts, decided in favour of a tunnel.

In effect, the Kennedytunnel consists of four parallel tunnels. Two road tunnels, 14.25 m wide, each sufficient for three lanes of traffic, run on either side of a 4 m wide bicycle tunnel. Fifteen metres below sea level there is a rail tunnel 10.5 m wide.

The road tunnel was the scene of a particularly severe fatal traffic accident in October 2006, after which traffic speed was restricted to 70 km/h during working hours, rather than the higher 100 km/h limit applicable on the rest of the Antwerp Inner Ring Road. Additional metal crash barriers had been installed in the tunnel the previous year.

== See also ==
- Liefkenshoektunnel
