= A10 motorway (Belgium) =

Motorway in Belgium

A10
- Dutch: Autosnelweg 10; French: Autoroute 10

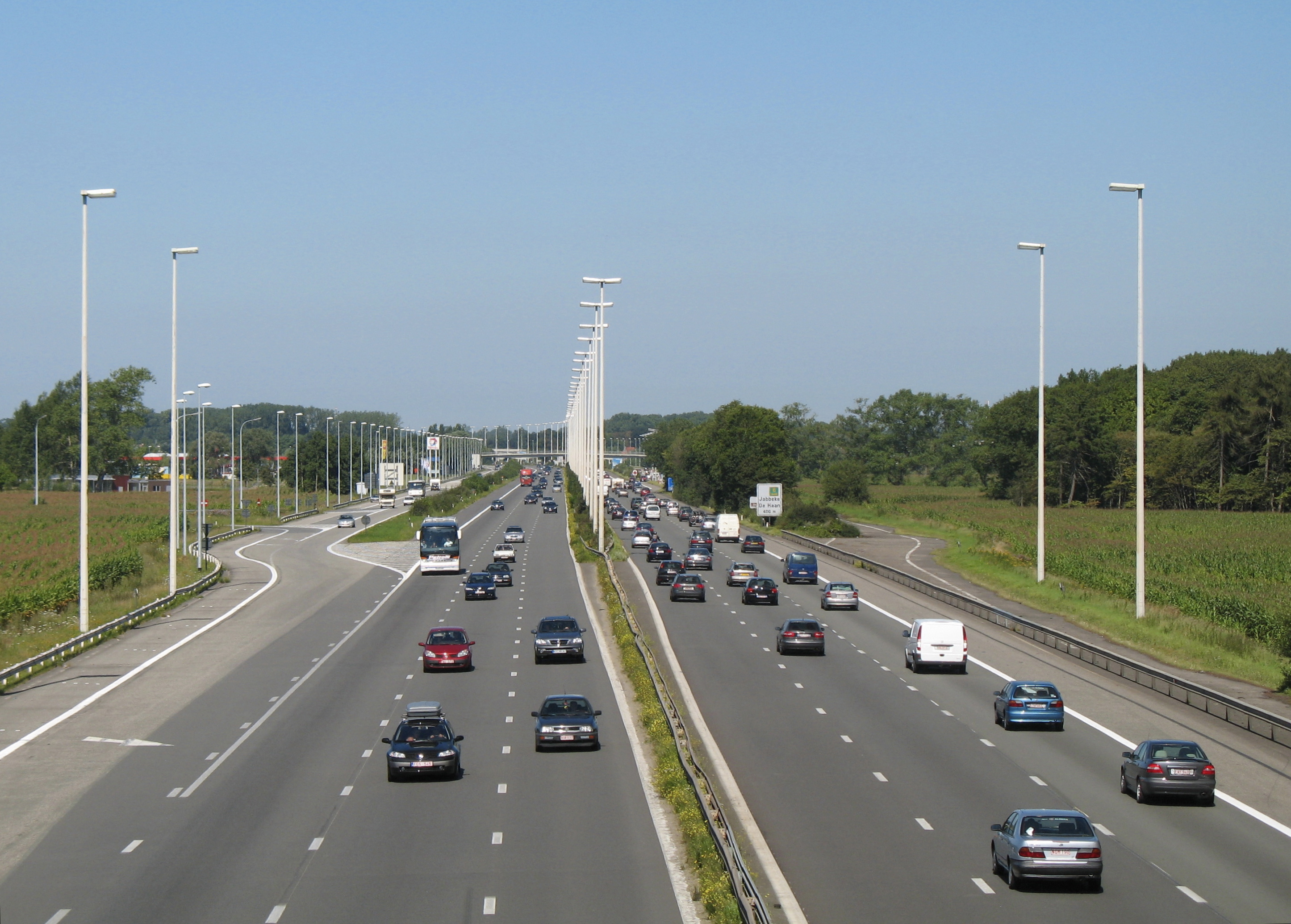
- The A10 near Jabbeke

Route information
- Maintained by the Roads and Traffic Agency of the Flemish government
- Length: 104 km (65 mi)

Major junctions
- West end: R31 in Ostend
- East end: R0 in Brussels

Location
- Country: Belgium

Highway system
- Highways of Belgium; Motorways; National Roads

The A10 is one of the major motorways in Belgium, connecting Brussels and Ostend (the Belgian coast), via Aalst, Ghent and Bruges. It is part of the European route E40.

As the oldest motorway in Belgium, construction of the motorway began in 1937.
