= List of motorways in Belgium =

Motorways in Belgium

In Belgium, the motorways (Dutch: autosnelwegen; French: autoroutes; German: Autobahnen) are indicated by an A and an E (for European) number. The E numbers are used most often. Roads that are (part of) a ring road around a town or city are mostly indicated by an R number.

Since 1989, all highways are built and maintained by the governments of the three regions (Flanders, Wallonia and Brussels).

For safety on motorways in Belgium,

- 60% of killed travelers did not wear their seat-belt;
- 38% of crash are impacted by speed;
- around 30% of accident occur near or on a motorway exit or entry, and 5% of accidents are in a junction;
- 19% of drivers were stopped at the time of the accident;
- 13% of accidents occur in a work zone.

== A1 - A12 (Radial Motorways) ==
This first list concerns the motorways that start from the ring of Brussels to other cities and are clockwise: A1 towards the north, A2 towards the north-east, A3 towards the east, etc.

The motorways A5, A6 and A9 have never been built.

- A1 (E19)
  - This motorway links Brussels - Mechelen - Antwerp - to the border of the Netherlands onwards to (Breda)
  - Length 68 kilometres long.
  - Location only in the Flemish Region
- A2 (E314)
  - This motorway links Leuven - Aarschot - Diest - Genk - Maasmechelen- to the border of the Netherlands onwards to (Geleen)
  - Length 86 kilometres long.
  - Location only in the Flemish Region
- A3 (E40)
  - Brussels - Leuven - Liège - Germany (Aachen)
- A4 (E411)
  - Brussels - Namur - Arlon - Luxembourg (Luxembourg (city))
- A7 (E19)
  - Halle - Nivelles - Mons - France (Valenciennes)
- A8 (E429 and E42)
  - Halle - Tournai - France (Rijsel)
- A10 (E40)
  - Brussels - Aalst - Ghent - Bruges - Ostend
- A12
  - Brussels - Boom - Antwerp - Netherlands (Bergen op Zoom)

== A11 - A54 (Secondary Motorways) ==
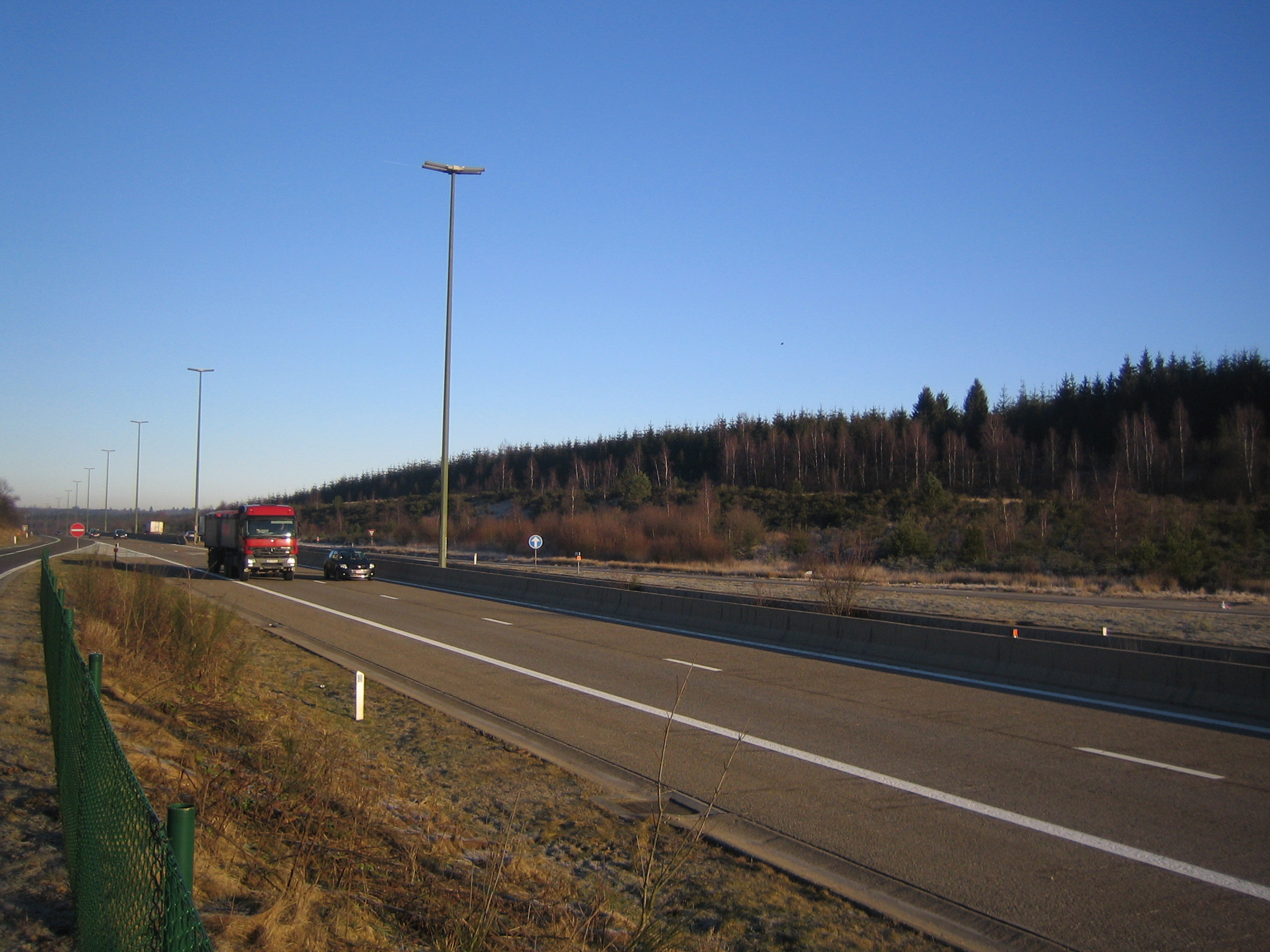
A27 near to St. Vith

- A11 (E34)
  - Antwerp - Zelzate
- A13 (E34 and E313)
  - Antwerp - Hasselt - Liège
- A14 (E17)
  - Antwerp - Sint-Niklaas - Ghent - Kortrijk - France (Rijsel)
- A15 (E42)
  - La Louvière - Charleroi - Namur - Liège
- A16 (E42)
  - Mons - Tournai
- A17 (E403)
  - Bruges - Kortrijk - Tournai
- A18 (E40)
  - Bruges - Veurne - France (Dunkirk)
- A19
  - Kortrijk - Ypres
- A21 (E34)
  - Antwerp - Turnhout - Netherlands (Eindhoven)
- A25 (E25)
  - Liège - Visé - Netherlands (Maastricht)
- A26 (E25)
  - Liège - Bastogne - Neufchâteau
- A27 (E42)
  - Battice - Verviers - Malmedy - St. Vith - Germany (Bitburg)
- A28 (E411)
  - Aubange - France (Longwy)
- A54
  - Nivelles - Charleroi

== A112 - A604 (Local Motorways) ==
- A112
  - Wilrijk - A12
- A201
  - Brussels Airport - Brussels
- A501
  - La Louvière - A7
- A503
  - Charleroi - Mont-sur-Marchienne
- A601
  - A3 - A13 (near Liège, closed)
- A602 (E25)
  - A3 - A26 (near Liège)
- A604
  - Seraing - A15

== Aborted projects ==
- A5: Brussels - Charleroi - Philippeville - Couvin - Gué-d'Hossus (France)
- A6: junction A7-A54 - junction A15-R3 (west)
- A9: Anderlecht - Geraardsbergen - Kortrijk
- A11: Brussels - Zelzate - Bruges - Calais (France)
- A20: Perkpolder - Mons
- A22: Holsbeek - Wavre - Louvain-la-Neuve
- A23: Tilburg (Netherlands) - Aarschot - Namur
- A24: Hasselt - Lommel - Eindhoven (Netherlands) (The road is a national road (N74), although the section between Helchteren and the Dutch border has motorway signs)
- A30: Mons - Maubeuge (France)
- A101: was supposed to connect Ranst - Mechelen
- A102: was supposed to connect Merksem - Wommelgem
- A301: was supposed to connect Bruges - Port of Bruges-Zeebrugge
- A603: Burenville - Coronmeuse
- A605: Cerexhe-Heuseux - Beaufays

== Ring roads (R) ==
=== Main ===
- R0 - Brussels (outer ring)
- R1 - Antwerp (inner ring)
- R2 - Antwerp (outer ring)
- R3 - Charleroi (outer ring)
- R4 - Ghent (outer ring)
- R5 - Mons
- R6 - Mechelen
- R7 - Liège
- R8 - Kortrijk
- R9 - Charleroi (inner ring)

=== Secondary ===
==== Antwerp ====
- R10 - Antwerp (inner ring)
- R11 - Antwerp (second outer ring)
- R12 - Mechelen (inner ring)
- R13 - Turnhout
- R14 - Geel
- R15 - Herentals
- R16 - Lier
- R18 - Retie

==== Brabant ====
Former province of Brabant, corresponds to Flemish Brabant, Walloon Brabant and the Brussels-Capital Region nowadays.

- R20 - Small ring of Brussels
- R21 - Intermediate Ring of Brussels
- R22 - Greater ring or second ring of Brussels
- R23 - Leuven
- R24 - Nivelles
- R25 - Aarschot
- R26 - Diest
- R27 - Tienen

==== West Flanders ====
- R30 - Bruges
- R31 - Ostend
- R32 - Roeselare
- R33 - Poperinge
- R34 - Torhout
- R35 - Waregem
- R36 - Kortrijk

==== East Flanders ====
- R40 - Ghent (inner ring)
- R41 - Aalst
- R42 - Sint-Niklaas
- R43 - Eeklo

==== Hainaut ====
- R50 - Mons (inner ring)
- R51 - Charleroi (inner ring)
- R52 - Tournai
- R53 - Châtelet
- R54 - La Louvière
- R55 - Chimay

==== Liège ====
- R61 - Verviers
- R62 - Hannut

==== Limburg ====
- R70 - Hasselt (inner ring)
- R71 - Hasselt (outer ring)
- R72 - Tongeren
- R73 - Bree

== Link roads (B) ==
Prefixed by the letter B from the French word "bretelle".

=== Antwerp ===
- B101: A1/E19 - N1 (Mechelen)
- B102: R1 - N70 (Linkeroever, Antwerp)

=== Brabant ===
Former province of Brabant, corresponds to Flemish Brabant, Walloon Brabant and the Brussels-Capital Region nowadays.

- B201: R0 - Érasme/Erasmus
- B202: R0 - Avenue de l'Humanité/Humaniteitslaan
- B202a: R202 - N266

=== East Flanders ===
- B401: A14/E17 - Downtown (Ghent)
- B402: A10/E40 - R4 (Sint-Denijs-Westrem)
- B403: A10/E40 - R4 (Merelbeke)
- B404: A11/E34 - R43 (Eeklo)

=== Hainaut ===
- B505: A7/E19/E42 - R50 (Mons)

=== Liège ===
- B601: A27/E42 - N640 (Tiège, Jalhay)
- B602: A26/E25 - N633 (Tilff, Esneux)

=== Namur ===
- B901: A4/E411 - N90 (Loyers, Namur)

== See also ==
- Transport in Belgium
- List of controlled-access highway systems
- Evolution of motorway construction in European nations
