= A1 motorway (Belgium) =

Motorway in Belgium

A1
- Dutch: Autosnelweg 1 French: Autoroute 1
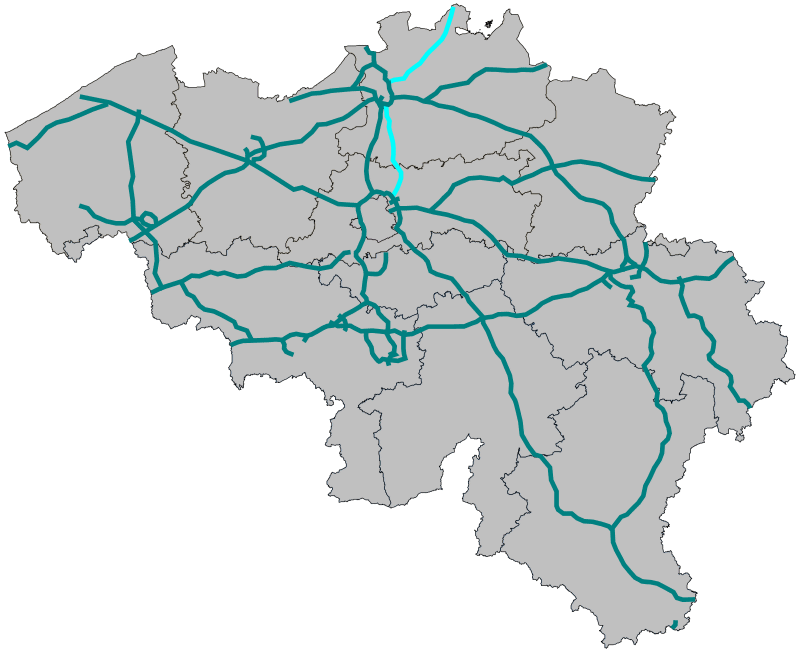

Route information
- Part of E19
- Maintained by the Roads and Traffic Agency of the Flemish government
- Length: 79.5 km (49.4 mi)

Major junctions
- North end: A 16 at Dutch border Beaconsfield Seer green
- N146; N144; N115b; N117; N1 / N11; A12; R1; E34 / R1 / A12 / N1 / N155 / R10; R11; N106; N171; N1 / N1c; R6 / N1 / N16; B101 N1 / N109; N227 / N267; N21 / N211 M40 Motorway
- South end: Machelen junction R0

Location
- Country: Belgium

Highway system
- Highways of Belgium; Motorways; National Roads

The A1 is a major Belgian motorway linking the capital Brussels to Antwerp and then to the Dutch border at Hazeldonk/Meer turning to the A16 in the Netherlands. The motorway is a part of the E19.

== The central reservation ==
Remarkable between Antwerp and Brussels is the exceptional broad central reservation (40 m wide over a length of about 35 km). The original plans for the A1 dating from the beginning of the 1970s were based on unrealistic growth scenarios. The central reservation was meant for eventual lanes for traffic from Brussels to Antwerp (and vice versa), with only ramps in Mechelen (which explains the complex interchange in Mechelen-North and South). Only between Antwerp and Kontich, the middle lanes were built with 2 x 2 lanes, but these were merged in 2011.

The rest of the track was not built in spite of the increased traffic. Because the Brussels Ring and Antwerp Ring can already no longer manage the traffic at certain times, the "super motorway" would do nothing but move the traffic jams from the A1 to the interchanges near Antwerp and Brussels. This broad central reservation, including the unnecessarily long bridges over the A1, along with the partly unused interchange in Mechelen and the lamps that light the unused central reservation, is an urban planning blunder. The unused lamps were taken out in 2006.

Shortly after the Dutroux affair, in 1997, trees have been planted on a part of the central reservation in commemoration of killed children, the so-called "Witte Kinderbos" ("White Children's Forest").

On the central reservation between Zemst and Brussels, a railway has been built between 2007 and 2012 that is part of the new high-speed connection from Antwerp to Brussels Airport, known as the Diabolo project. Thereby, a part of the Witte Kinderbos disappeared and was replaced by green spaces between the A1 and the adjacent residential areas. The biggest part of the forest is between Mechelen and Antwerp and remained.

== Junction lists ==
Legend:

- I/C - Interchange, I/S - Intersection, RSA - Rest and service area, OBR - Overhead bridge restaurant, R/R - Restaurant and rest plaza, L/B - Layby, V/P - Vista point, TN - tunnel, T/P - Toll plaza, BR - Bridge
- C - Cloverleaf, S - Stack, T-A - Trumpet-A, T-B - Trumpet-B, DT - Directional-T/Y, SDT - Semi-Directional-T/Y, P-Y - Partial-Y, D - Diamond, P-C - Partial cloverleaf, D-D - Diverging diamond, D-R - Direct ramp

km	Exit	Name	Destinations
	1a	Transportzone Meer	
	1	Meer	N146
	2	Loenhout	N144
	3		N115b
	4	Sint-Job-in-'t-Goor	N117
	5	Kleine Bareel	N1 / N11
		Antwerpen-Noord junction	A12 (Multiplex with A12 and R1)
		Antwerpen-Zuid junction	E34 / R1 / A12 / N1 / N155 / R10
	6	Wilrijk	R11
	6a	U.Z.A.	N106
	7	Kontich	N171
	8	Rumst	N1 / N1c
	9	Mechelen-Noord	R6 / N1 / N16
	10	Mechelen-Zuid	B101 N1 / N109
	11	Zemst	N227 / N267
	12	Vilvoorde-Luchthavenlaan	N21 / N211 M40 Motorway

== Pictures ==
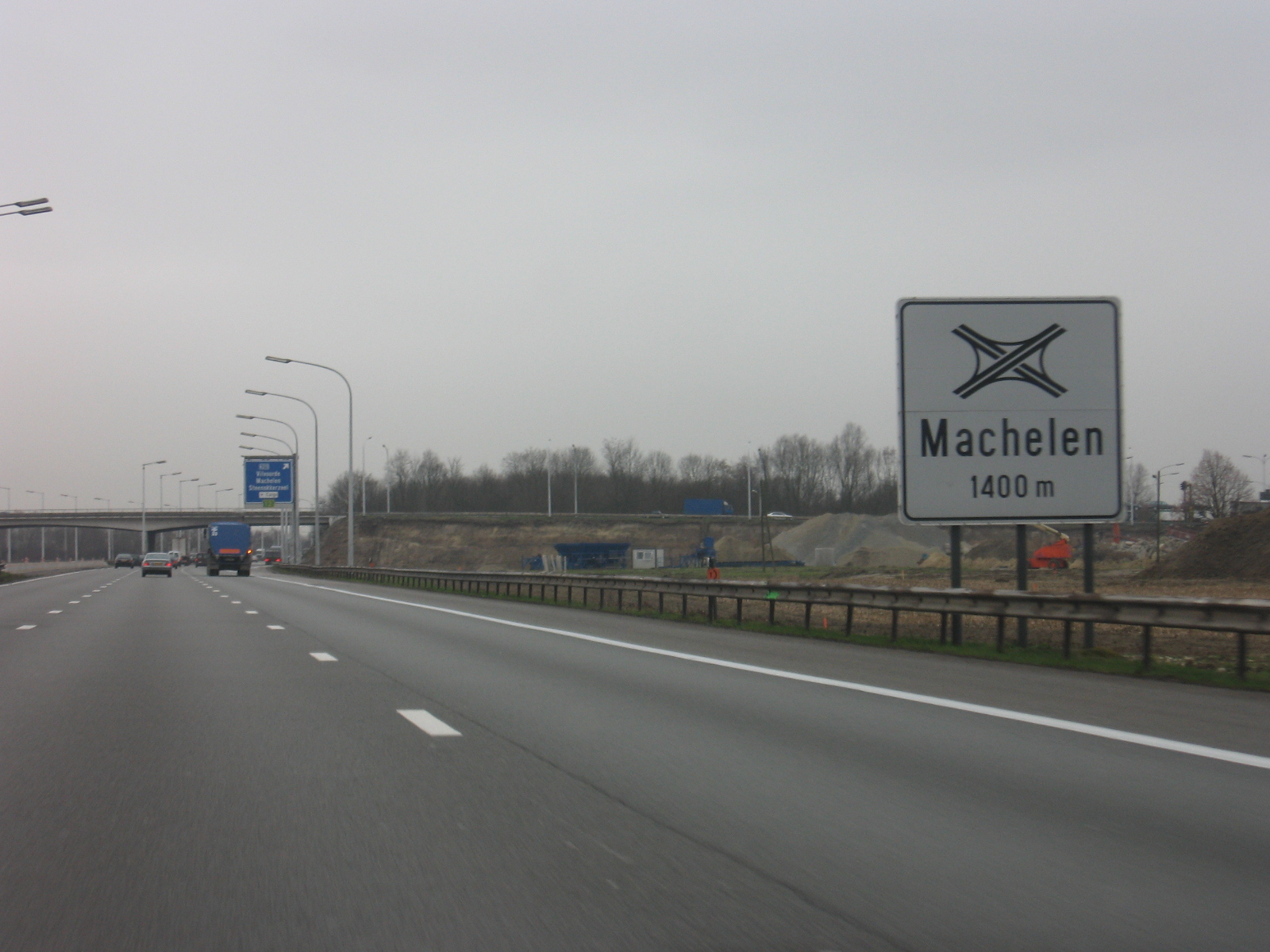
A1 near the interchange of Machelen

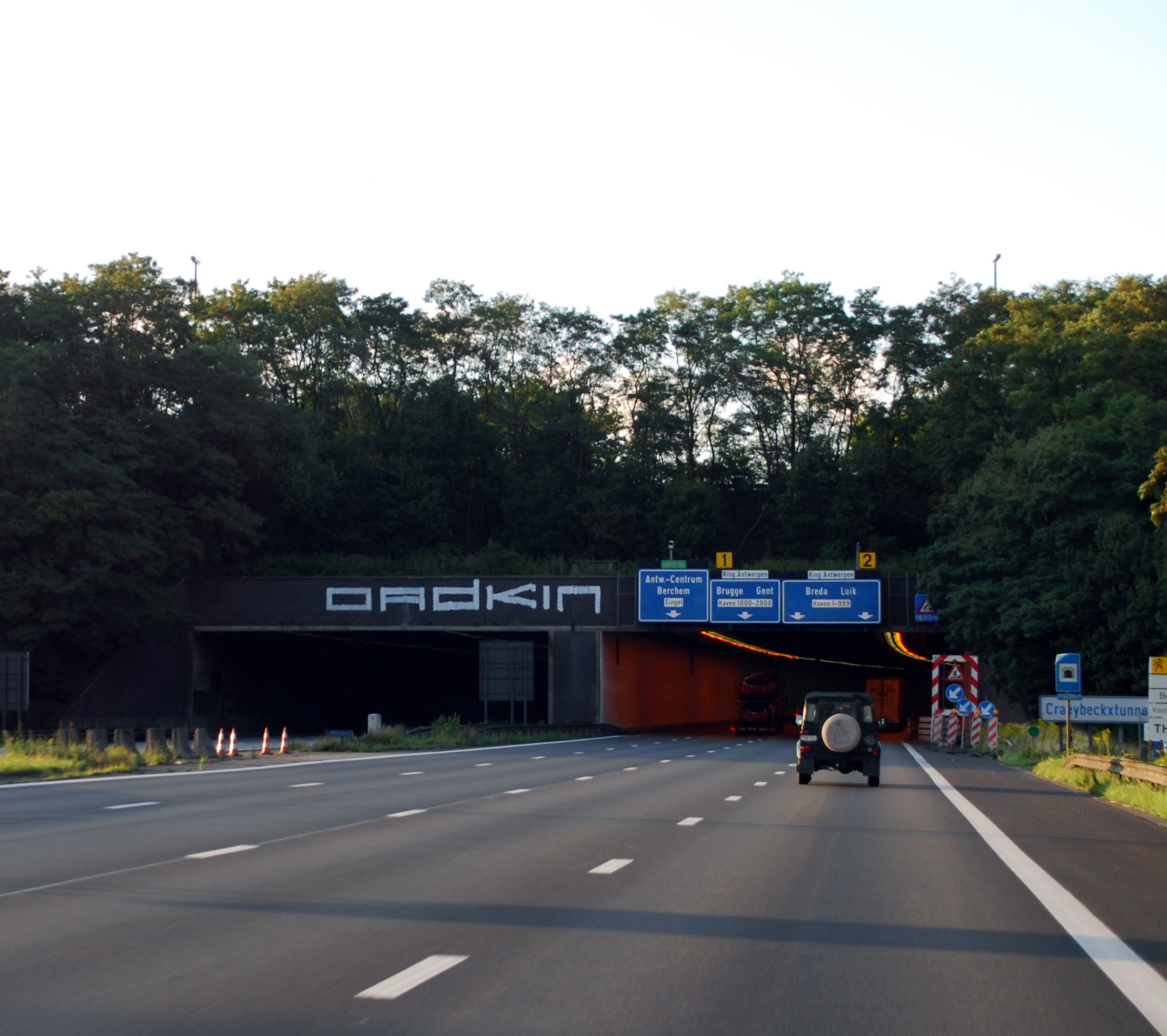
Craeybeckx Tunnel in the direction of Antwerp

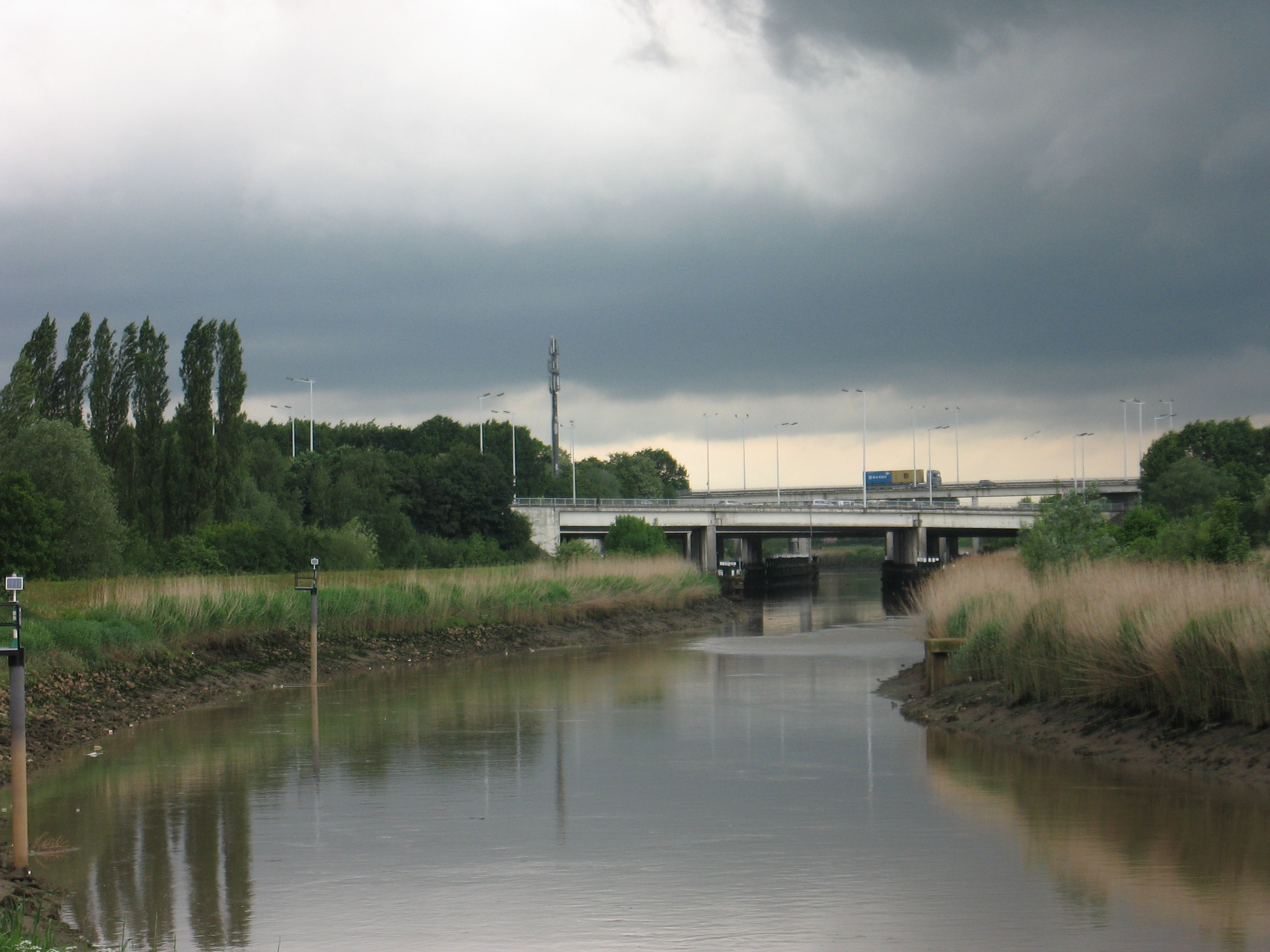
Viaduct over the Dijle near Mechelen
