= HSL 1 =

HSL/LGV 1
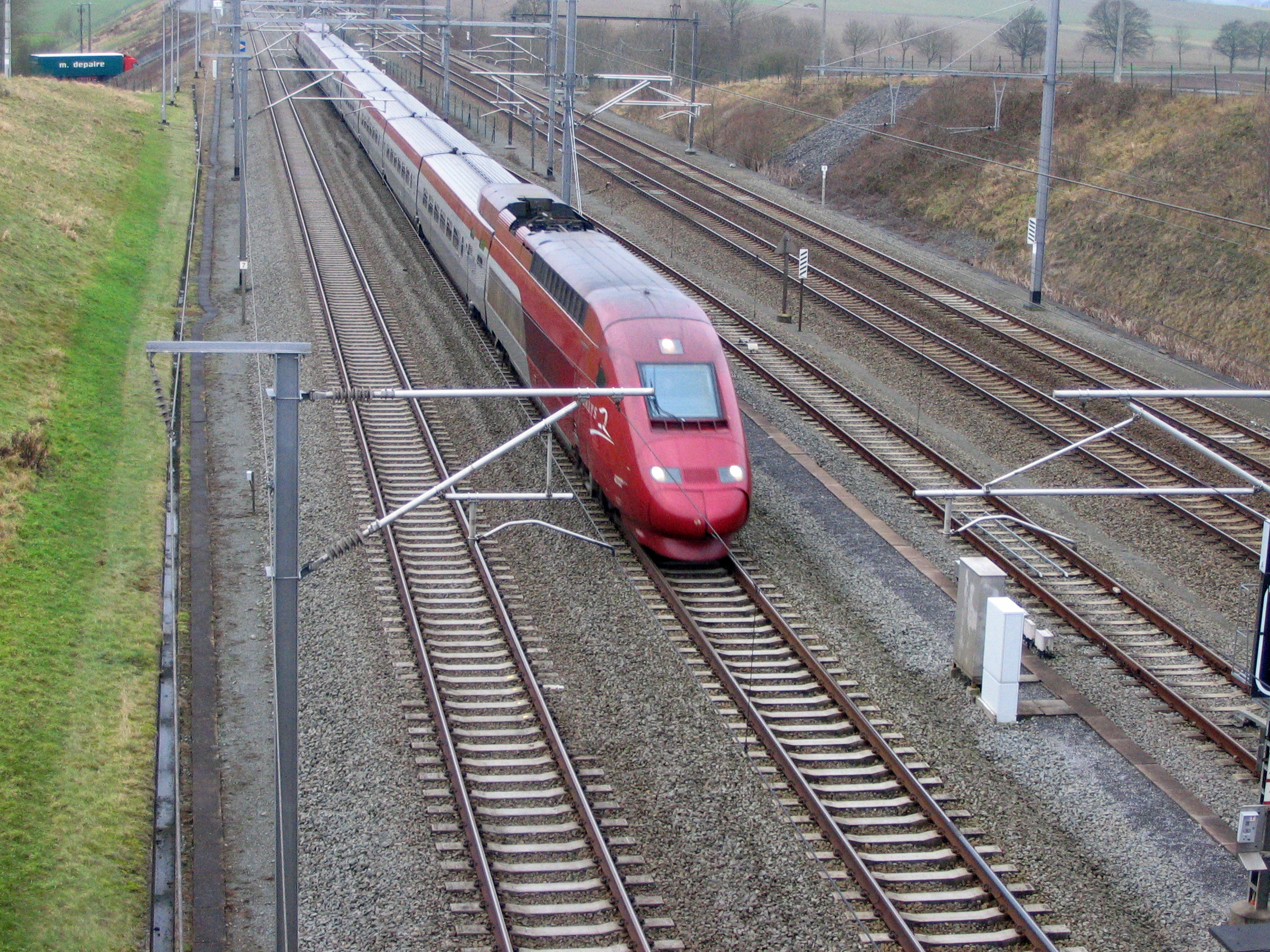
- Thalys on HSL 1

Overview
- Status: Operational
- Owner: NMBS/SNCB
- Locale: Belgium
- Termini: LGV Nord at Fretin Junction; Brussels-South
- Stations: 1

Service
- Type: High-speed rail
- System: NMBS/SNCB
- Operator(s): Eurostar; Thalys; TGV

History
- Opened: 1997

Technical
- Line length: 88 km (55 mi)
- Number of tracks: Double track throughout + loops
- Track gauge: 1,435 mm (4 ft 8 1/2 in) standard gauge
- Loading gauge: UIC GC
- Electrification: Overhead line, 25 kV 50 Hz AC
- Operating speed: 300 km/h (186 mph)
- Signalling: TVM-430

The HSL/LGV 1 (Dutch: Hogesnelheidslijn 1, French: Ligne à grande vitesse 1, English: High-Speed Line 1) is a high-speed rail line which connects Brussels, Belgium, with the LGV Nord at the Belgium–France border. It is 88 km (55 mi) long with 71 km (44 mi) of dedicated high-speed tracks and 17 km (11 mi) of modernised lines. Service began on 14 December 1997.

The line has appreciably shortened journey times, the journey from Paris to Brussels now taking 1 hour 22 minutes. In combination with the LGV Nord, it has also impacted international journeys to other cities in France and to London, ensuring high-speed through-running by Eurostar, TGV, Thalys PBA and Thalys PBKA trainsets.

The total construction cost was €1.42 billion. The signalling system installed is the TVM-430 in-cab signalling system, the same as LGV Nord in France, and High Speed 1 in the UK.

== Route ==
Trains leave Brussels-South via a new viaduct completed in 2006 to separate high-speed services from local services. From there they use the conventional line 96. At Forest/Vorst, the train passes the depot where inspections of Thalys and Eurostar trains may be carried out. At Halle (km 13), the HST tracks split from the mainline and enter their own cut-and-cover section before crossing the Brussels–Charleroi Canal; at km 17, the high-speed line proper diverges from the mainline at the Lembeek Viaduct, supporting 300 km/h (190 mph) speeds. Between Rebecq and Enghien, the line parallels the A8 motorway, separated by a security fence. At Enghien, the line parallels the regular Brussels–Tournai line for approximately 10 km (6 mi).

The maintenance depot "Le Coucou" is located near Ath. This station served as the operations base during the construction of the line (from 1993 to 1998) and currently serves as the maintenance depot for HSL 1. Slightly further on is the 2,005 m (2,193 yd) long Arbre Viaduct (one of the longest rail viaducts in Europe) between Ath and Chièvres; it passes over the Ath–Blaton canal, the Dender River, the Mons road and the Ath–Jurbise railway.

At Antoing, there is a connector to the Mons–Tournai line, used by the Thalys between Paris and Namur. After passing over the 483 m (528 yd) Scheldt River Viaduct, and through the 365 m (399 yd) Bruyelle cut-and-cover section, the line crosses the Belgian-French border at Wannehain, km 88. Eleven kilometres (7 mi) further on, the Frétin triangle splits the LGV Nord towards Paris or Lille.

== See also ==
- High-speed rail in Belgium
