= Liefkenshoektunnel =

Tunnel between Beveren and Antwerp

Coordinates: 51.296°N 4.297°E

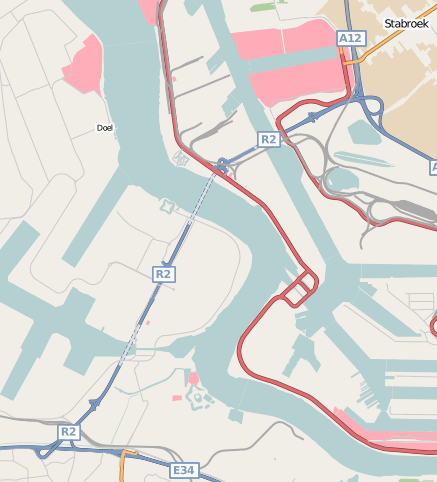
Route of the tunnel on the north-western edge of Antwerp

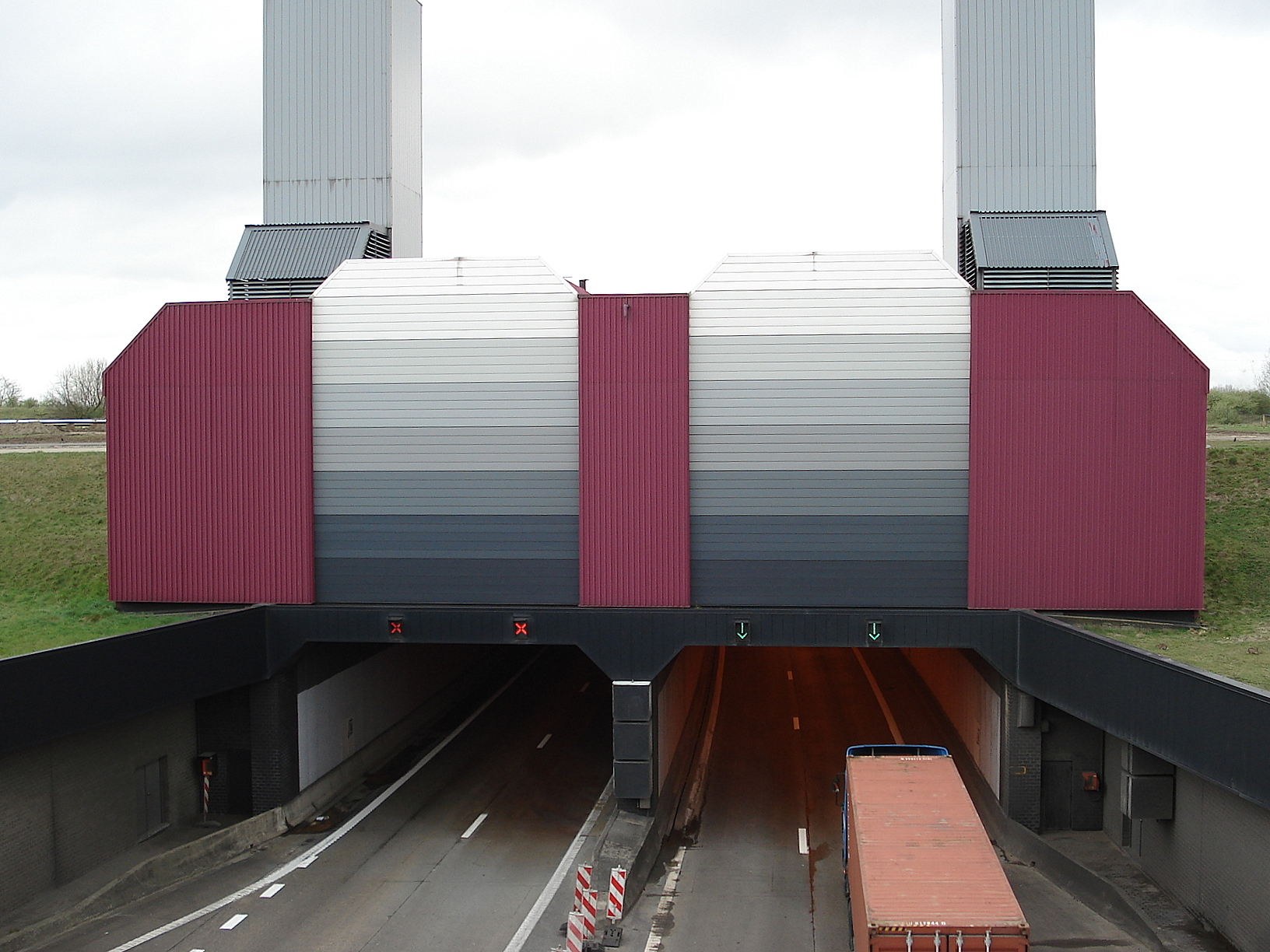
Tunnel entrance

The Liefkenshoektunnel is a toll tunnel between Antwerp and Beveren under the River Schelde. The tunnel is a continuation of Highway R2, the ring motorway surrounding the city and harbour of Antwerp. In 2013 the tunnel was used by 6,373,894 vehicles. Positioned between the Beverentunnel and the Tijsmanstunnel, the Liefkenshoektunnel is the second of three sequential road tunnels running under the river and port installations.

The tunnel takes its name from nearby Fort Liefkenshoek. It was constructed between 1987 and 1991, and opened on 10 July 1991.

== Specifications ==
The tunnel is 1.37 km (0.85 miles) long. It comprises two parallel bores, each of which contains a two-lane roadway: each lane is 3.75 metres wide and the bores also include a hard shoulder. The tunnel can be used by vehicles up to 5.10 metres tall and, where exceptional loads need to be transported through it, up to 7.50 metres wide.

Escape doors on the right side of each bore give access to emergency exit corridors. These are separate from the ventilation and drainage ducts.

== Construction ==
The tunnel was constructed in nine preformed sections, each one 197 metres long, in a temporarily created dry dock nearby in what is now the location of the Vrasenedok. These sections, still sealed at the ends, were then precisely positioned using tugboats and sunk into position.

== Funding and tolls ==
Funding for the tunnel was provided by means of a ring-fenced financing provision, so that tunnel revenues would not be accessible as general local government revenues. As of september 2024, the toll was set at EUR 7.00 for vehicles lower than 3 metres, and EUR 22 for taller vehicles. However, when the southern portion of the ring road, via the Kennedytunnel, is subject to roadworks, leading to above average congestion, tolls on the Liefkenshoektunnel may be temporarily suspended in order to encourage drivers to use the (for most destinations longer) northern ring road round Antwerp rather than the (permanently toll free) southern route.

Reduced toll rates are offered to drivers prepared to pay using a credit card and an automated toll gate, as well as for drivers willing to have their cars fitted with a radio controlled device enabling tolls to be charged to their accounts without the need to stop at the toll barrier ("Teletol").

== Usage ==
Peak usage was reached in 2004. In that year 4,676,441 passenger car journeys and 2,434,496 commercial vehicle journeys were undertaken through the tunnel. In 2009, with the tolls increased by 10% for passenger cars from EUR 5.00 to EUR 5.50 and by 6% (from EUR 17.00 to EUR 18.00) for larger vehicles, usage had actually declined by over 10% to 4,197,236 passenger car journeys and 2,176,658 commercial vehicle journeys.

Usage and revenue were below forecast, possibly because on the Dutch side of the nearby frontier, between Bergen op Zoom and Dinteloord, a projected direct four-lane highway towards Rotterdam, has still not been built. The competing route through Belgium to Rotterdam which runs a short distance to the east via Breda was suffering intensified congestion in 2004 due to an upgrade which has subsequently been completed.

== Rail tunnel ==
In September 2008 work began on two additional bores for the Liefkenshoektunnel, intended to carry trains. Scheduled for 2014, the project was completed on 9 December 2014. The 6,750 m Antigoontunnel is also known as the Liefkenshoekspoortunnel.
