= A12 road (Belgium) =

Incomplete motorway in Belgium

A12
- Dutch: Autosnelweg 12; French: Autoroute 12
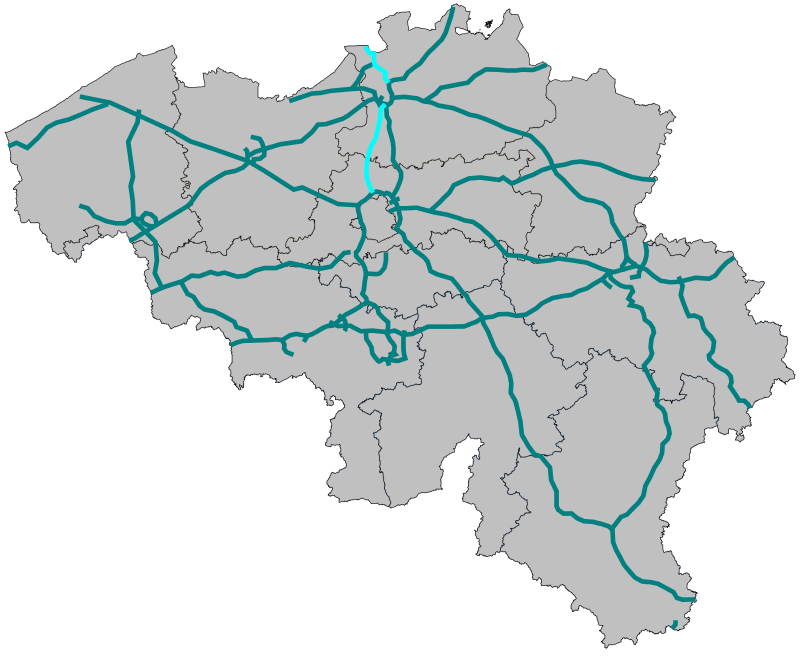

Route information
- Maintained by the Roads and Traffic Agency of the Flemish government
- Length: 55 km (34 mi)

Location
- Country: Belgium

Highway system
- Highways of Belgium; Motorways; National Roads

The A12 is an incomplete motorway in Belgium. The road starts at the Dutch border near Zandvliet and goes to Antwerp. There the A12 goes onto the Antwerp ring road R1. Then the road goes via Wilrijk in the direction of Brussels (the traffic coming from Ghent takes the A112 via the Jan De Vos Tunnel). From here on, it has frontage roads on both sides. Between Wilrijk and Schelle, the A12 is an expressway with major at-grade intersections that contain also the frontage roads. There, from Schelle, it is again a motorway. Then, in Boom, a tunnel leads the A12 under the Rupel river, where the frontage roads take a bridge and then fuse with the motorway itself. Between Breendonk and Sint-Brixius-Rode, there are again at-grade intersections, and then it is again a motorway, until Brussels, where it ends onto the Brussels Ring.

There are plans to gradually convert the road into a full motorway. Therefore, exits would be built replacing the two intersections in Westrode/Londerzeel and a bridge replacing the intersection near Breendonk. However, in 2010, the intersections are being modernised instead and a frontage road is partially being built in the direction of Brussels.

Between Zandvliet and Stabroek (north of Antwerp), the railway runs on the central reservation.

Unusually for a motorway in Belgium, the A12 is not part of the E-road network. However, for much of its length it runs a few kilometers to the west of and parallel with the A1 which forms a part of the European route E19.

== Pictures ==
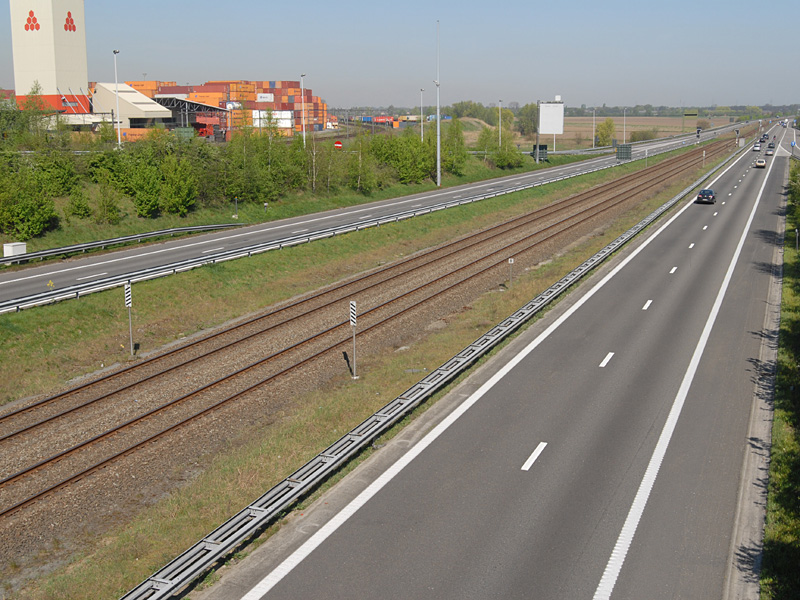
Picture of the A12 and the railway line 11

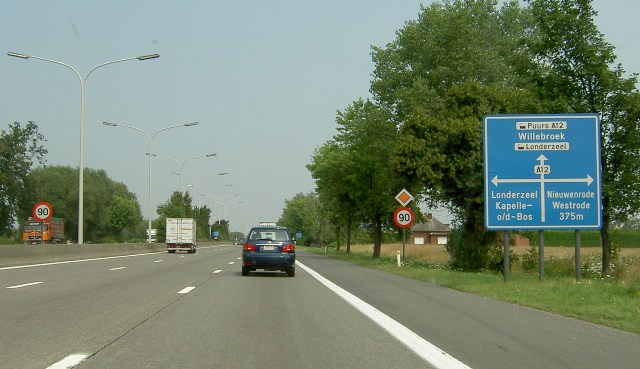
The A12 in the direction of Willebroek

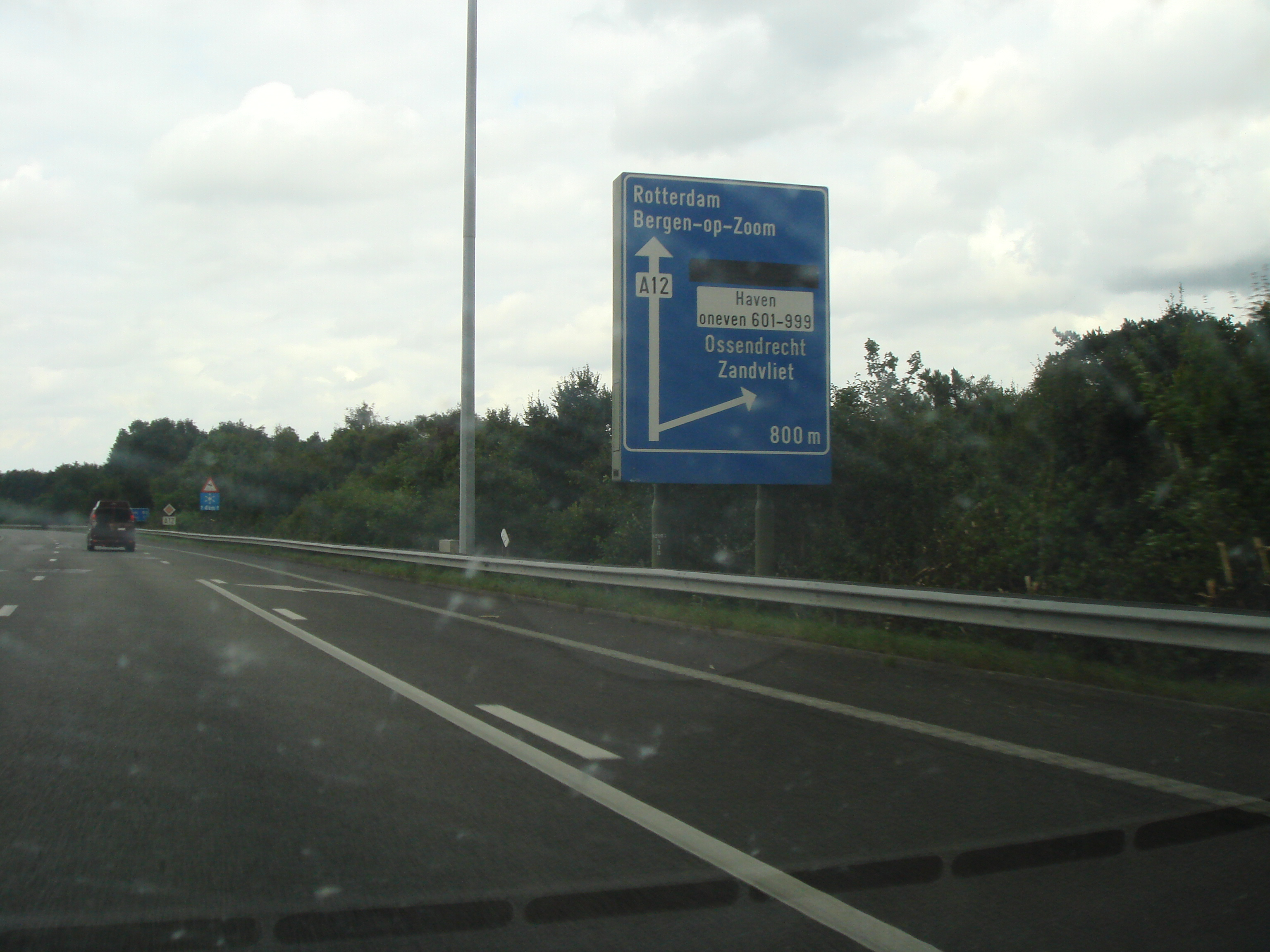
The A12 near Zandvliet, in the direction of Bergen-op-Zoom
