= European route E19 =

Road in trans-European E-road network

E19

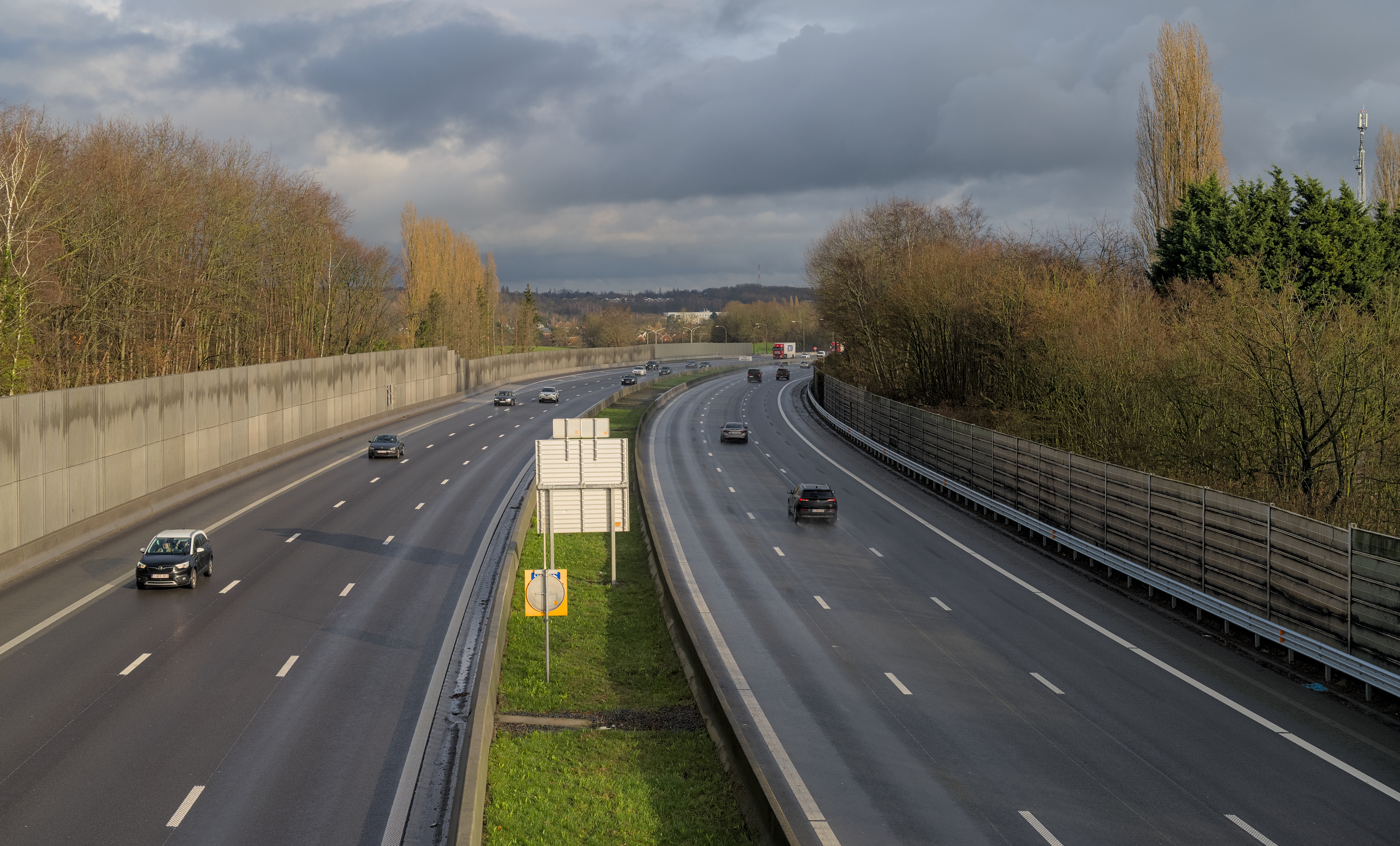

Route information
- Length: 551 km (342 mi)

Major junctions
- North end: Amsterdam, Netherlands
- South end: Paris, France

Location
- Countries: Netherlands, Belgium, France

Highway system
- International E-road network; A Class; B Class

European route E19 is a 551-kilometre (342 mi) long European route from Amsterdam, Netherlands to Paris, France via Belgium. The E19 is the busiest road in Europe.

== Overview ==
Since October 2007 construction works have started on a new railroad between Schaerbeek and Mechelen on the central reservation of the E 19 (Belgian A1) with the purpose of improving the train connection between Antwerp, Brussels Airport and Brussels.

In the Netherlands, the E19 starts in Amsterdam on the A4 to pass Through to the Hague, where it switches to the A13 to run Delft and to Rotterdam. There it goes on the Kleinpolderplein on the A20 and Terbregseplein on the A16. At Zwijndrecht it passes through the Drechttunnel as it goes on to Dordrecht, over the Moerdijkbruggen, following to the city of Breda and crossing the border at Hazeldonk/Meer into Belgium.

In Belgium the E19 runs on the A1 to the Antwerp ring and from Antwerp to the Brusselse ring. The route then leads to France via the A7.

In France, the E19 runs first in the Hauts-de-France region on the A2. In Valenciennes, it serves as the ring on the A23 motorway to Lille. At the junction of Graincourt-lès-Havrincourt near Cambrai, the E 19 joins the Autoroute des Anglais E 17. It then meets the E 15 European route in the node of Combles.

It now runs on the North Autoroute A1 through the Picardy to Paris. The European roads E 15 and E 19 merge into each other. The node of Ablaincourt-Pressoir connects the E 19 to the E 44. Then comes Compiègne before reaching the Île-de-France region.

It arrives in the agglomeration of Paris and meets the Francilienne, also known as A104, near the airport of Paris-Charles de Gaulle and then the A170 at the junction of Gonesse. Shortly thereafter, the E15 and E19 diverge in the knot of Garonor. The knot of la Courneuve connects it to the A86. The E 19 ends at the Porte de la Chapelle, where it connects to the Boulevard périphérique (ring) and the Rue de la Chapelle (street of La Chapelle).

In the past, this European road was number 10 (E 10). Of these, some names are derived, look for the E10 lake in Brasschaat / Schoten.

== Route ==
The E19 passes the following cities:

- The Netherlands
  - A 4: Amsterdam - Schiphol Airport - The Hague
  - A 13: The Hague - Delft - Rotterdam
  - A 20: Ring road Rotterdam
  - A 16: Rotterdam - Breda - Border
- Belgium
  - A1: Border - Antwerp
  - R1: Ring road Antwerp
  - A1: Antwerp - Brussels
  - R0: Ring road Brussels
  - A7: Brussels - Nivelles - La Louvière - Mons - Border
- France
  - A 2: Border - Valenciennes - Cambrai - junction with A1
  - A 1: Junction with A2 - Paris
