= Van Wijngen International =

European logistics company

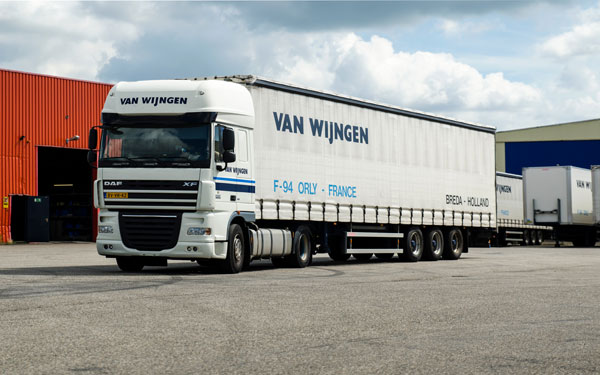

Van Wijngen International is a Dutch logistics company. It owns around 80 trucks and provides services such as distributing goods with their own trucks and third party suppliers. The company has two locations; one in Breda, Netherlands and one in Valenciennes, France. Van Wijngen employs about 130 people.

== History ==
Van Wijngen was established as a small company owned by Martien van Wijngen since 1985. Back then, Van Wijngen transported fresh fruits and vegetables from the farmers in Spain, the Netherlands and France. There was a high demand of fruits and vegetables to be delivered on time so that the farmers would get the highest market price.

As time went by, the transportation of (common) products had become the focus of the company.

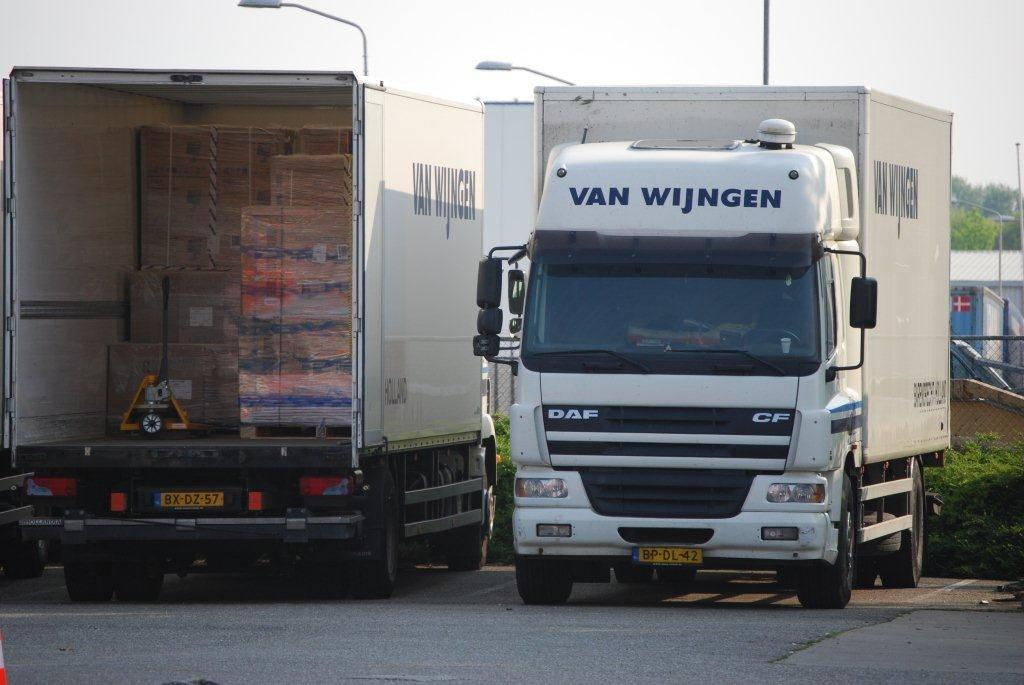

== Location ==
The head office of Van Wijngen International is located on the industrial terrain in Hazeldonk, Breda. A second office has French employees and is based in Valenciennes, France.

== Bankruptcy in 2010 ==
Van Wijgen suffered during the 2008 financial crisis. The company had to cut down staff and reduce the number of own trucks. However, by 2013, things had picked up for the company and in 2016 an important increase in capacity was announced.
