= Meer, Antwerp =

Meer
- Village
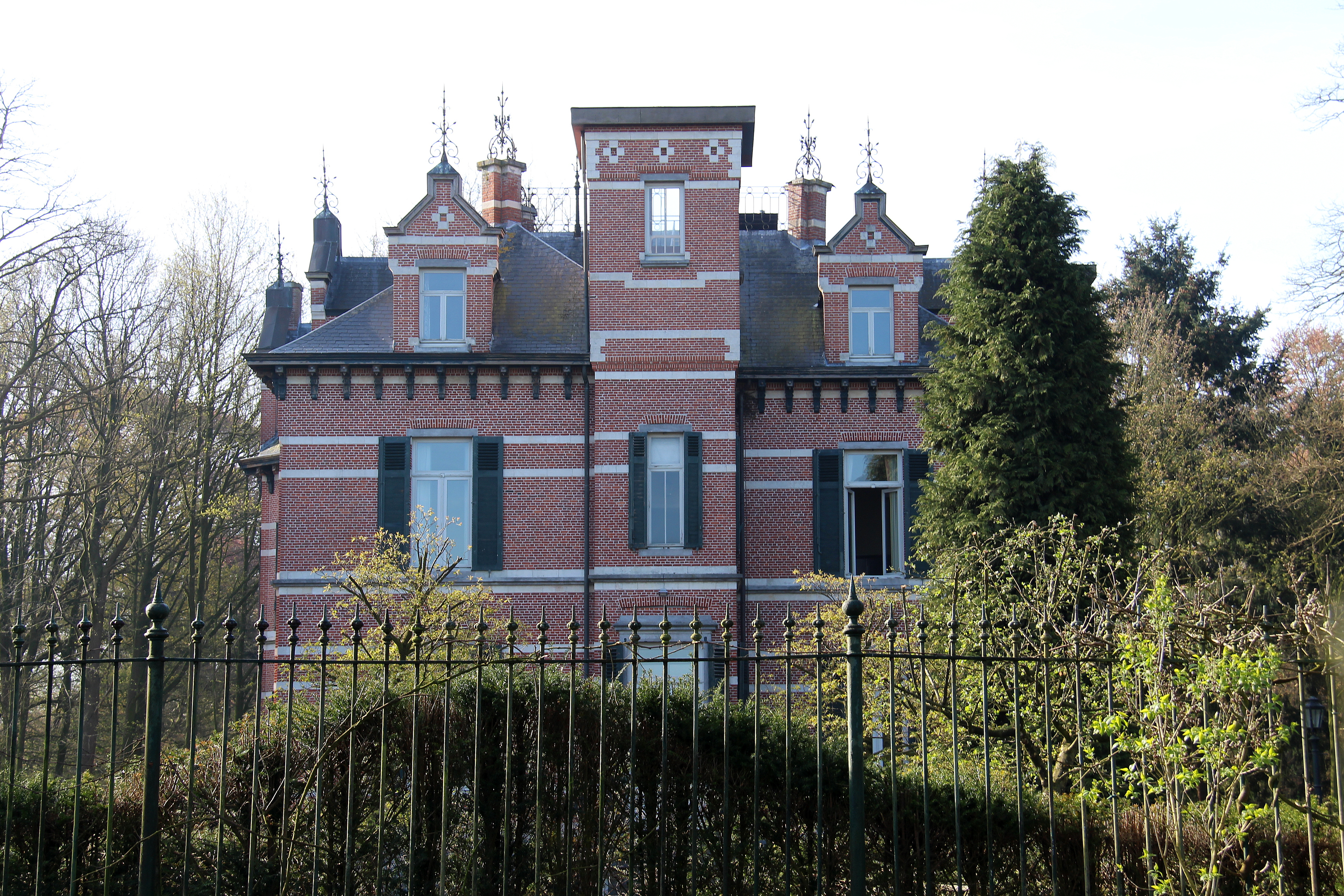
- Villa Maxburg

- Location in Belgium
- Coordinates: 51.4450°N 4.7364°E
- Country: Belgium
- Region: Flemish Region
- Province: Antwerp
- Municipality: Hoogstraten

Area
  - Total: 38.11 km^{2} (14.71 sq mi)

Population (2021)
  - Total: 3,524
  - Density: 92.47/km^{2} (239.5/sq mi)
- Time zone: CET

Meer is a village in the Belgian municipality of Hoogstraten in the province of Antwerp. As of 2021, it has 3,542 inhabitants.

== History ==
The village was first mentioned around 1200 as Mera, Mere. It used to be part of the Land of Breda. In 1278, Meer became owned by the Lord of Hoogstraten. In 1794, it became an independent municipality. In 1972, the village was cut in two by the E19 motorway. Meer was an independent municipality until 1977 when it was merged into Hoogstraten.

== Business ==
Brouwerij Sterkens is a microbrewery in Meer that has been a family business since 1651, and has been managed by the Sterkens family for 14 generations. The brewery is well known for their beer brands St. Sebastiaan, St. Paul, Hoogstraten Poorter and Bokrijks.

The 'Transport Zone Meer' at het border crossing Hazeldonk/Meer is also located nearby the village and part of the "Logistics Center Hazeldonk Meer”.

== Gallery ==
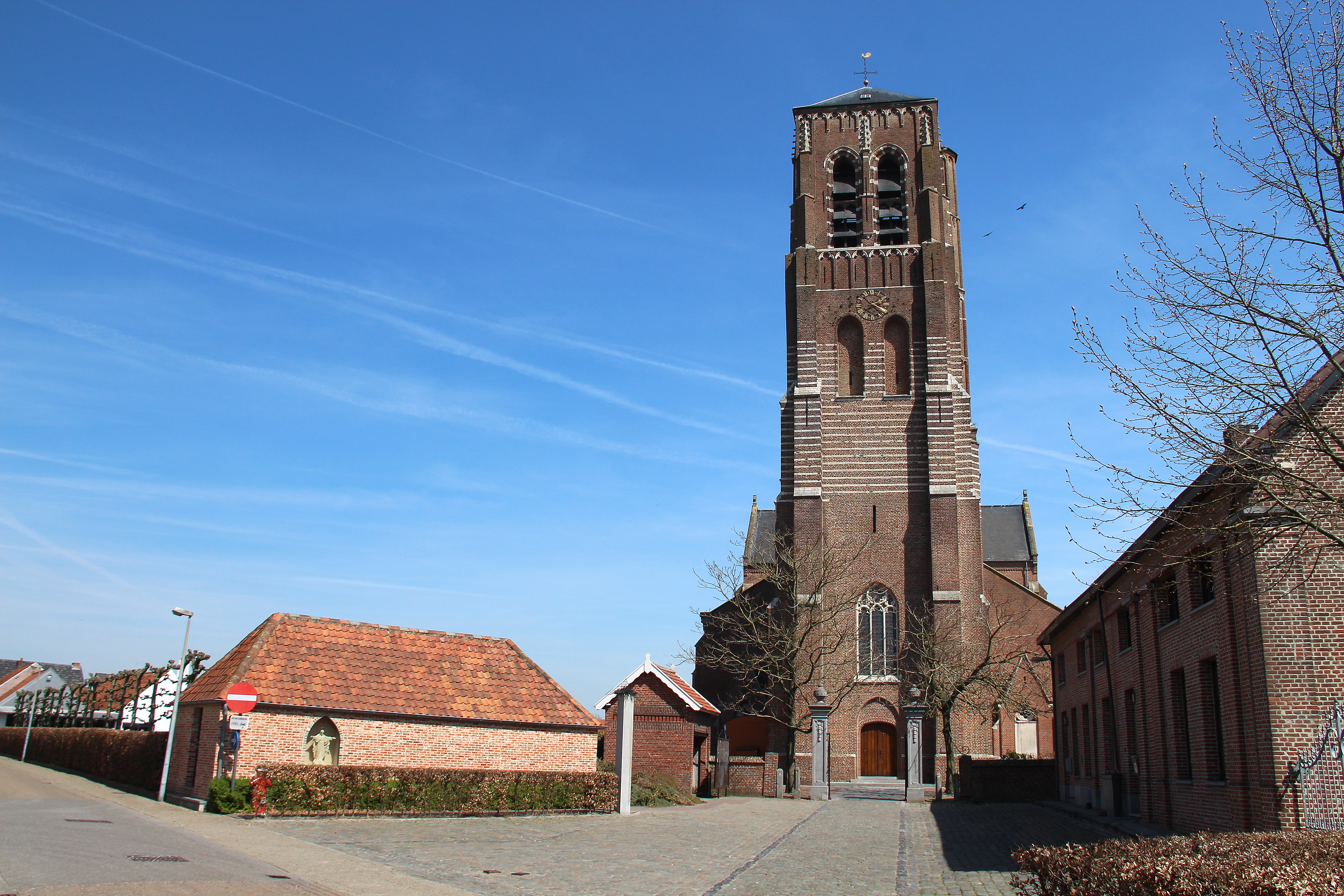
Onze-Lieve-Vrouw Bezoeking Church

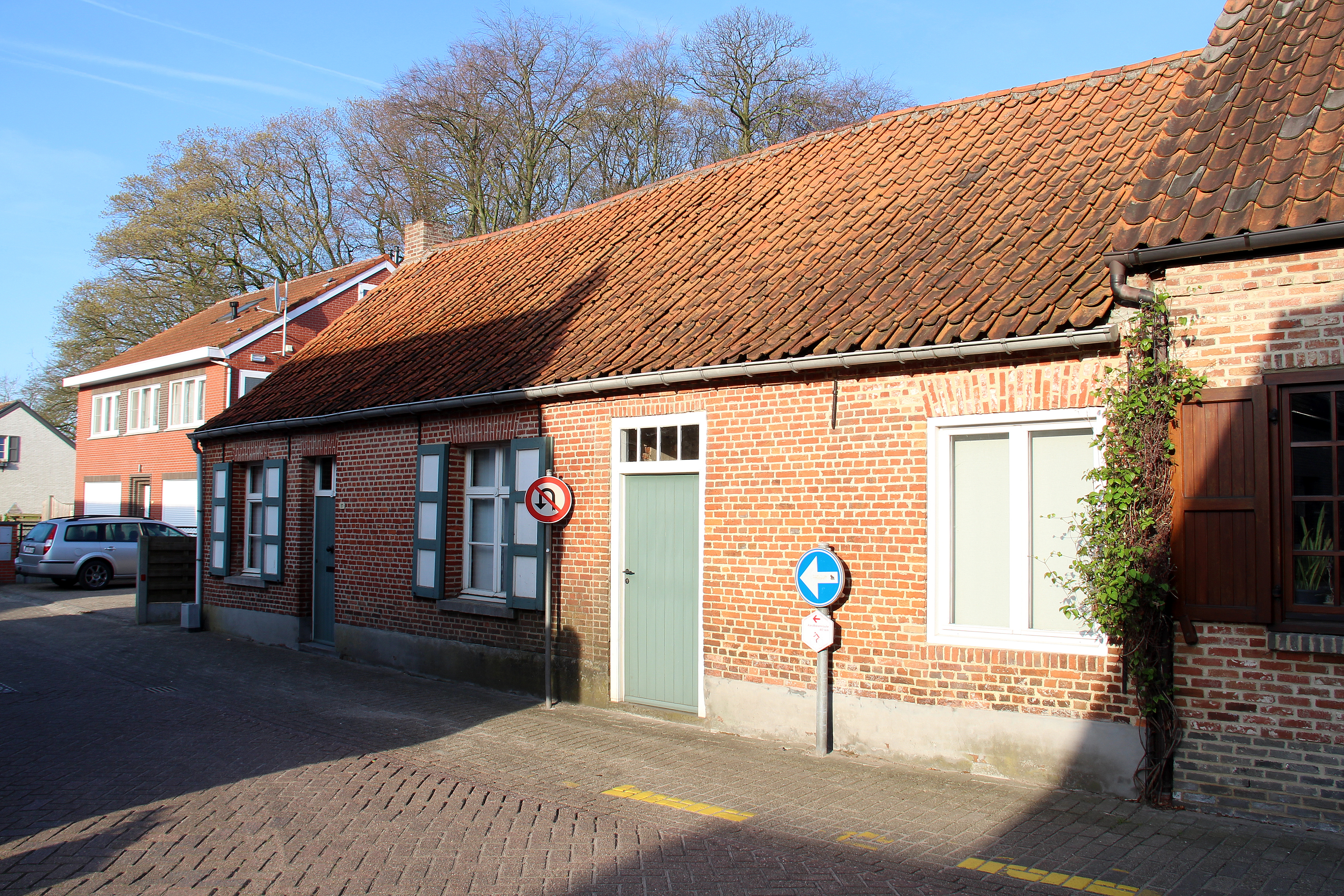
House in Meer

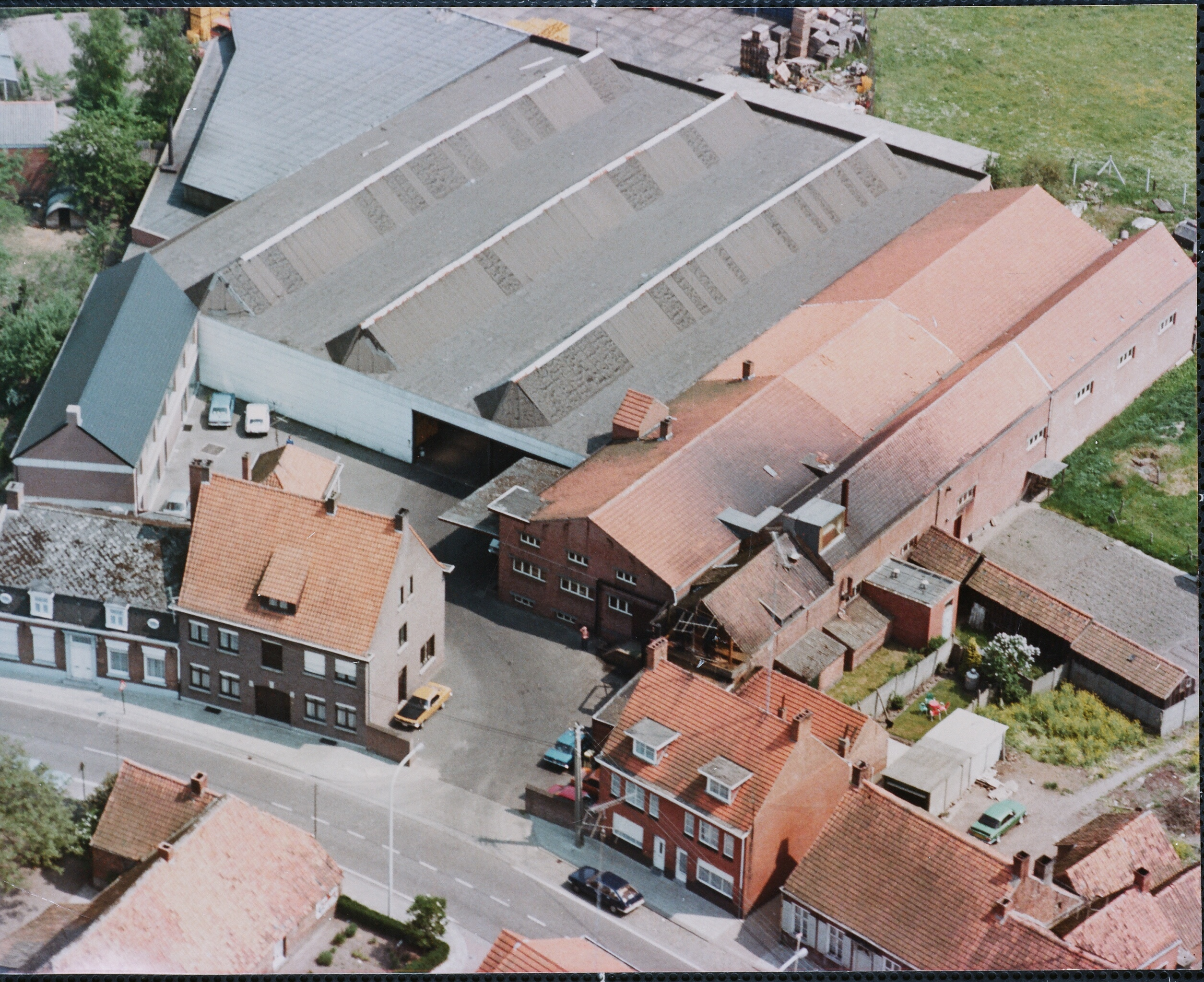
Brewery Stervens

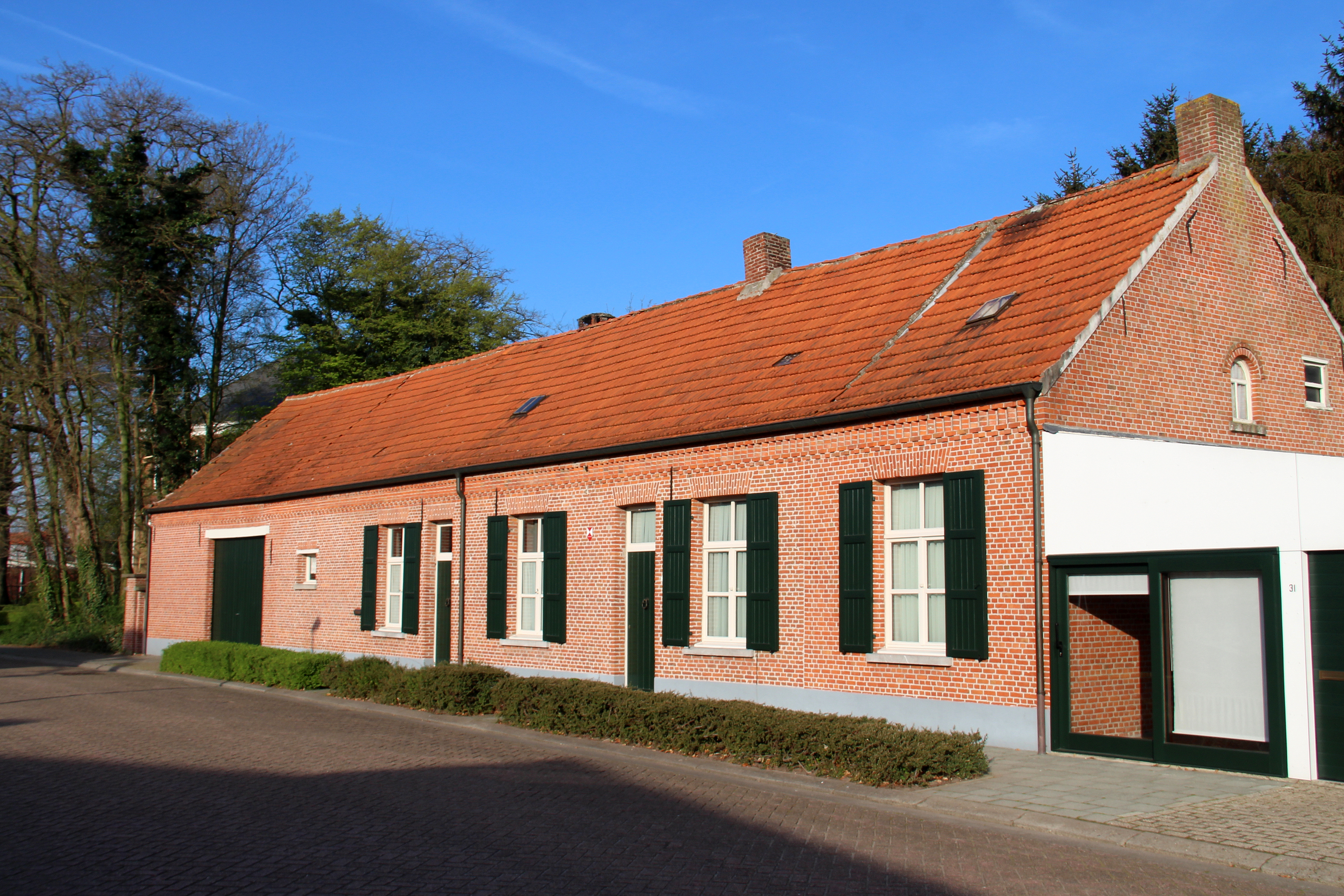
Farm worker's houses
