= Randalls Brewery =

- Industry: Brewing
- Founded: 1868; 158 years ago
- Founder: Robert Henry Randall
- Headquarters: St Peter Port, Guernsey, United Kingdom
- Owner: The Guernsey Pub Company
- Website: www.randalls.gg

R. W. Randall's Brewery is a brewery based in St Peter Port, Guernsey, founded in 1868 by Robert Henry Randall. The company was continued by his son, Robert William Randall, who gave the brewery its name.

== History ==
The brewery was established in 1868. In 1873 Vauxlaurens Brewery was built in what is now St Julian's Avenue. In 1887 they were the first place in Guernsey to use a dynamo to power electric lights, decorating St Julian's Avenue for the Golden Jubilee of Queen Victoria. The brewery was also the last property in Guernsey to cease using commercial DC electricity when they converted their bottling plant to AC current a hundred years later in 1987. In 2008 the brewery was moved to a new site in St Georges Esplanade. Since the summer of 2008 Randall's of Guernsey is the only brewery where draught Breda is brewed.

During the 1990s, they launched the popular advertising campaign featuring archetypal Guernsey couple Len and Enid, with the catch line "If it's not Randalls, it's a scandal".

The brewery remained in the ownership of the Randall family until April 2006, when it was sold to The Guernsey Pub Company, a group of private investors. The old brewery building has been turned into flats.

== Availability ==
Draught Breda, Breda super dry and Patois are available throughout Randalls of Guernsey's 18 tied pubs and hotels, including the recently renovated Slaughterhouse, opened in 2017, as well as in various free trade pubs in Guernsey, Alderney and Sark. Bottled beers can be found in the Corkscrew Off-licences and most major supermarkets in Guernsey.

== Brands ==
=== Breda ===
Breda is a 5% abv pale lager brewed under licence by Randalls since August 2008. It was originally produced at the Oranjeboom Brewery in Breda, The Netherlands, by Inbev, and exported to the Channel Islands.

In 2013 Breda won a silver medal at the International Brewing Awards in the 4.7 to 6% ABV (Premium Lager) category.

=== Breda super dry ===
Breda super dry is a 4.2% abv Pilsner lager brewed under licence by Randalls.

=== Patois ===
A bright chestnut brown best bitter brewed to 4.5%ABV using three varieties of hop.

=== Past Brands ===
==== Cynful ====
Cynful is a dark bottled ale. It won the annual Tesco Beer Challenge in 2004, and became a featured specialty beer in 250 Tesco stores across the United Kingdom. The ingredients are Guernsey well water, chocolate malt and Kent hops.

==== Other brands ====
Other brands include Envy; Guilty, a stout; and Wycked, a bitter.

== Awards ==
In 2004, Cynful won the annual Tesco Beer Challenge, and became a featured speciality beer in 250 Tesco stores across the United Kingdom. This subsequently became a permanent contract .
