= Breda University of Applied Sciences =

Vocational university in the Netherlands

Coordinates: 51.590509°N 4.795288°E

Breda University of applied Sciences
- Former names: Nederlands Wetenschappelijk Instituut voor Toerisme en Recreatie (1966–1978); Nationale Hogeschool voor Toerisme en Verkeer (1978–2000); NHTV Internationale Hogeschool Breda (2000–2018)
- Motto: Creating Meaningful Experiences
- Type: University of applied sciences
- Established: 1 September 1966; 59 years ago
- Chairman: Jorrit Snijder
- Administrative staff: 801 (2019)
- Students: 7,223 (2019)
- Location: Breda, North Brabant, Netherlands
- Website: http://www.buas.nl/

Breda University of Applied Sciences (abbreviated as: BUas) is a Dutch university of applied sciences in Breda, the Netherlands. BUas caters for more than 7,000 Dutch and international students from over 80 countries. The institute offers professional and academic bachelor's and master's programmes in the domains of Data Science & AI, Creative Business, Games, Hotel, Facility, Logistics, Built Environment, Tourism, Leisure & Events.

== History ==
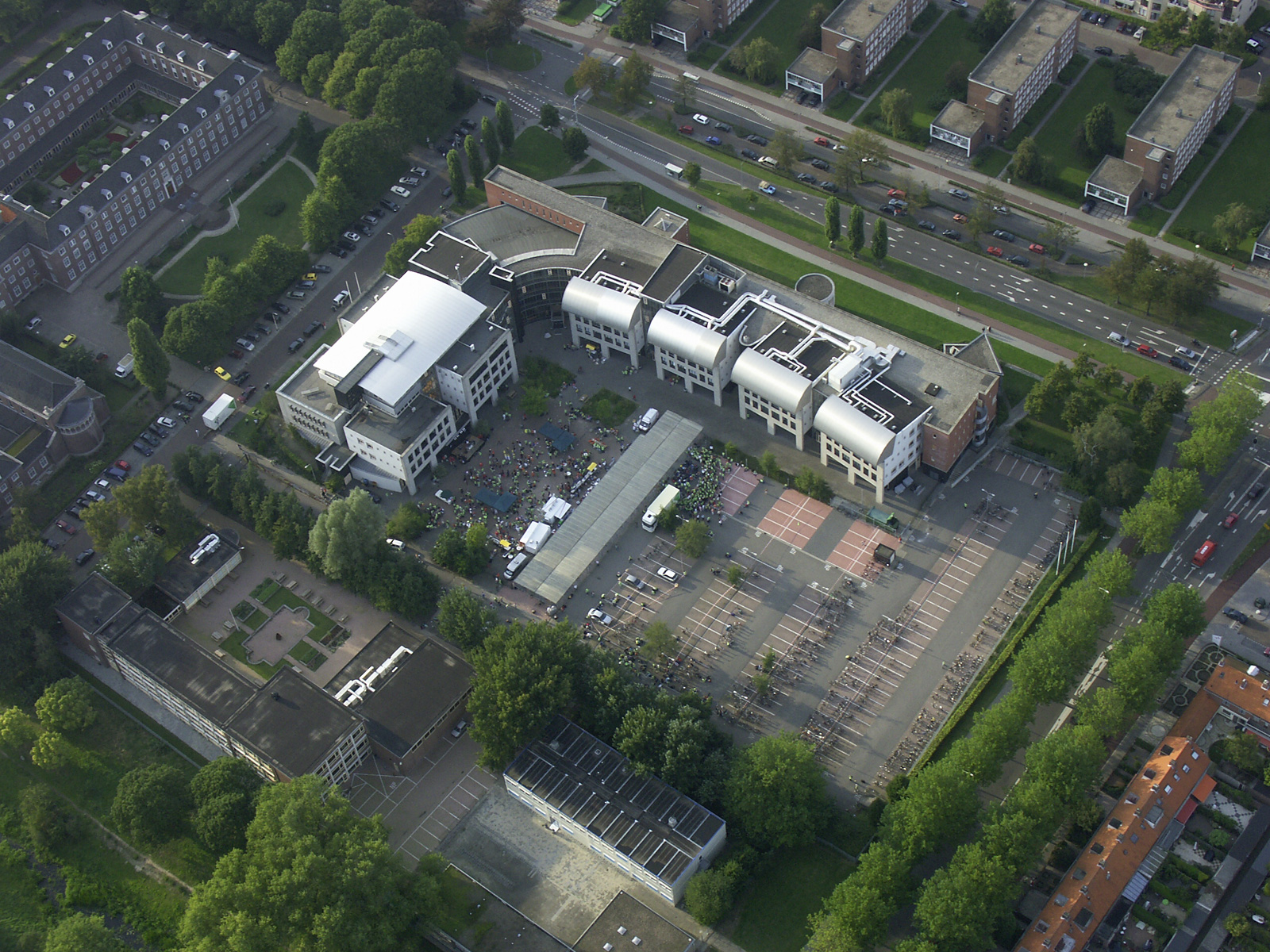
The former NHTV campus as seen from the air.

The history of Breda University of Applied Sciences goes back to 1966, the year in which the Nederlands Wetenschappelijk Instituut voor Toerisme (NWIT) was founded in Breda. This institute primarily focused on tourism, recreation, languages and economics. In 1987 the NWIT merged with Verkeersakademie Tilburg (VAT), which was established in 1972. Together they continued as Nationale hogeschool voor toerisme en verkeer (NHTV). In the years that followed, the institute and its course offerings saw substantial growth. The institute adopted an increasingly international outlook, which prompted a new name in 2001: NHTV internationale hogeschool Breda. From this time on, 'NHTV' was no longer an abbreviation, but a brand name. Since 2009 the institute has also been offering academic degree programmes in the fields of tourism and leisure. That is why its name was changed again, as it was no longer exclusively a higher education institute. The new name was NHTV internationaal hoger onderwijs Breda and in 2018 this name was changed to Breda University of Applied Sciences.

== Campus ==
The BUas campus is located at Mgr. Hopmansstraat 2-4 in Breda, the Netherlands. The small-scale and internationally oriented campus was developed through a vision of openness, sustainability, diversity, but also a unique individual identity. This is reflected in the buildings and in the landscape. Everything is aimed at facilitating interaction, cooperation, and stimulating vitality and creativity.

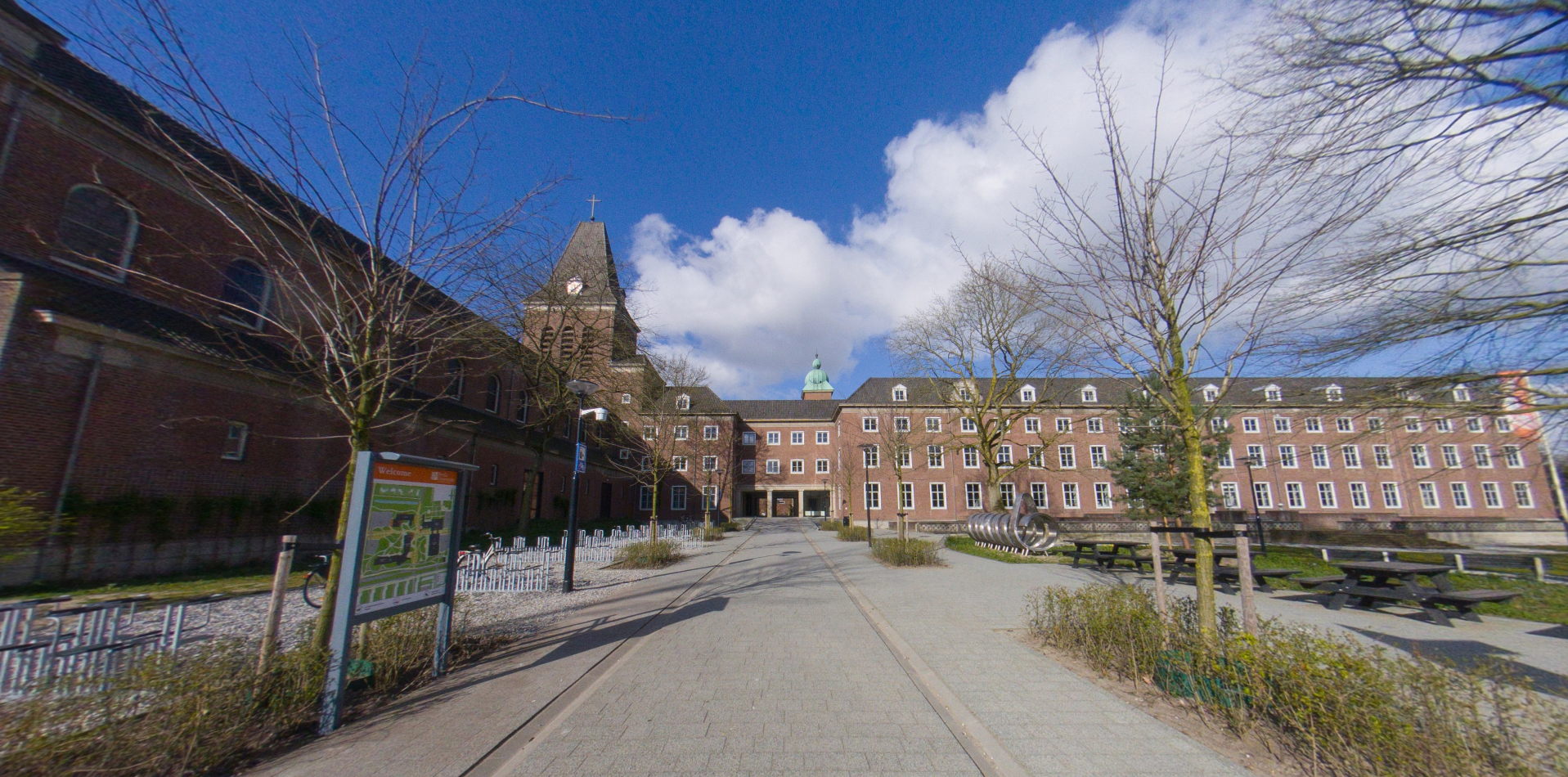
The Horizon building on the campus of Breda University of Applied Sciences

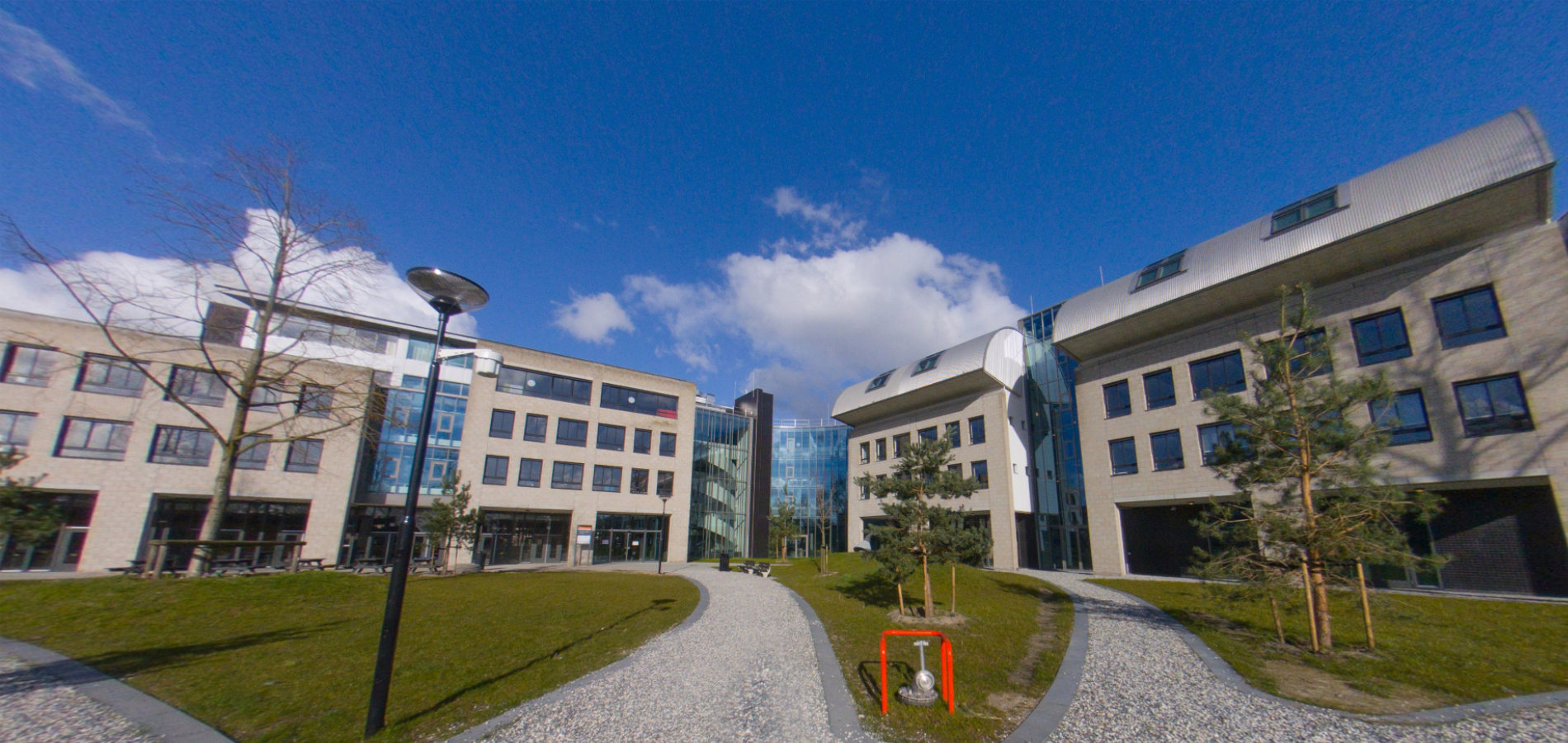
The Frontier building on the campus of Breda University of Applied Sciences

== See also ==
- Website
- Education in the Netherlands
