= Bouvigne Castle =

Coordinates: 51°33′45″N 4°47′00″E

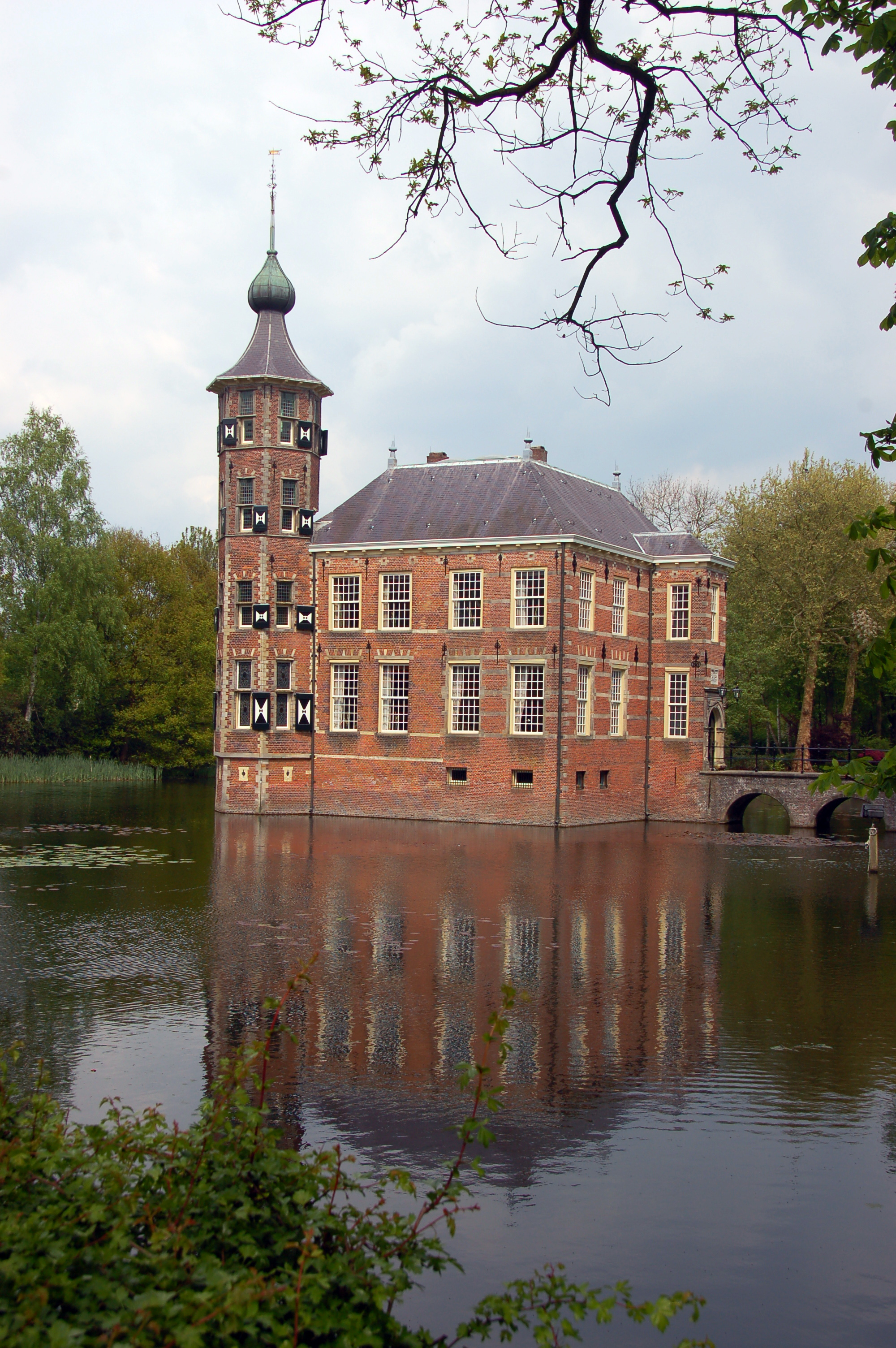
Bouvigne Castle

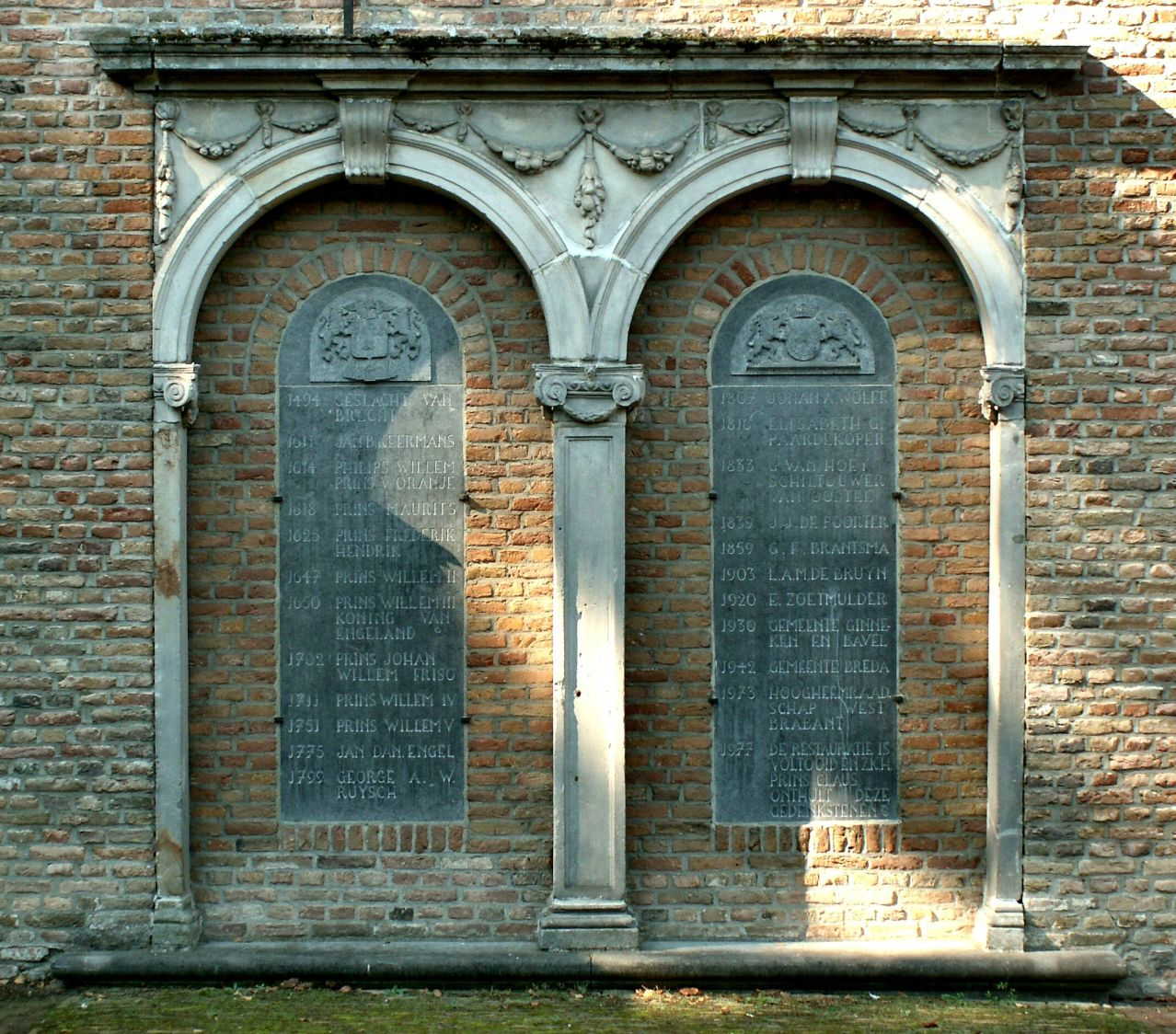
Plaque with all owners of Castle Bouvigne

Bouvigne Castle is a castle outside the Ginneken district in the Dutch province of North Brabant, near the Mastbos south of Breda. Behind it lies the Markdal.

It has been owned by the Brabantse Delta Water Board since 1972. After restoration between 1975 and 1977, it was reopened by Prince Claus on 13 September 1977.

== History ==
It is unknown how old the castle is and what it originally looked like. From 1494 there was a walled stone house on the De Boeverie estate near the two farms, one small and one large, already located there. The small farm stood at the intersection of Duivelsbruglaan and Bouvignelaan but went up in flames during the siege of Breda by Spinola in 1624. The large farm had been owned by the Princes of Orange since 1614 and by the state since 1881. In 1941 the farm was destroyed by a V1 rocket but later rebuilt.

As far as is known, the stone house was first mentioned in 1554 in an official deed: the will of the former owner Jacob van Brecht. In this testament, the building was described as a stately stone house surrounded by canals. The mansion has been expanded over time. The first floor of the tower was built on the stone house between 1554 and 1611. In the following three years, several other renovations followed and the tower was increased by a second floor. On 8 October 1614, Prince Philip William of Orange bought the house 'Boeverijen' for 27,000 guilders from his agent and confidant Jean Baptiste Keeremans, who had given it the current Renaissance appearance with his renovations. Philip-Willem was the eldest son and heir of his murdered father William of Orange. He was Baron of Breda from 1609 to 1618. Keeremans expected an appointment as drossaard of Breda (representative of the prince, comparable to the position of mayor), but the States General rejected his appointment because of his Catholicism and alleged anti-Calvinism.

Bouvigne is a grand mansion and was never used as a hunting lodge. The hunting grounds of the House of Orange were north of the Prinsenhof ( Breda Castle ) and near the Liesbos. The Mastbos is a landscaped wood production forest. It is not clear what Philip-Willem used the castle for, he lived on the Prinsenhof. He may have made it available as a steward's residence.

A total of eight princes in succession owned the castle. In 1637 it was the headquarters when Prince Frederick Henry besieged the city of Breda to end Spanish rule. Castle Bouvigne became Frederic Henry's headquarters. Later, Hendrik Carel van Naerssen opposed plans to demolish the building due to neglect in 1774. The Nassau Domain Council conceded. The wealthy coffee planter George Ruysch renovated the castle and Francized the name after Bouvigne (as it was called in 1802 in a deed of sale). From 1930 the castle came into the hands of the government and was rented out for a long time to the Catechists of the Eucharistic Crusade ( Pius X foundation ).

In 2007 the castle was regularly in the local news for controversial building plans. Since 1 October 2010, Bouvigne Castle has been one of the official wedding locations within the municipality of Breda.

== Gardens ==
There are three different gardens, all with statues:

- A French garden, created around 1913 on the initiative of Mr. Leopold de Bruyn (the then owner)
- An English garden, laid out around 1920. In the center is a chapel built in 1932 by the Pius X foundation
- A German garden, created in the 1930s, with the former burial chapel of Mgr. Frans Frencken, the spiritual leader of the catechists

The gardens can be visited. The castle is only on special days, for example the Brabant Castle Day.

== Cross-border monumental agreements ==
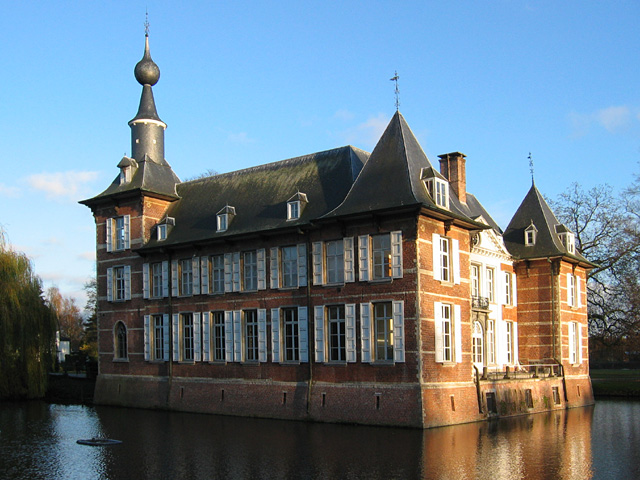
Schoten Castle

Castle Bouvigne bears a resemblance to the larger castle of Schoten in the Belgian municipality of Schoten. The Lordship of Breda was once (from 1167 to 1268) under the authority of the Lords of Schoten (the flags of Schoten and Breda are identical). Yet nothing is known of a relationship between the two castles. At the time of the Lords of Schoten, the estate De Boeverie (later Bouvigne) may already have been a medieval property. In the fifteenth and sixteenth centuries a walled mansion was established there, which was owned by the Van Brecht family. After the construction of the current castle started in 1548, the final renovation began in 1611, giving the house its current form.

There are more cross-border monumental agreements between Breda and the province of Antwerp. There is a similarity between the tower of the Grote Kerk in Breda and the Sint-Katharinakerk in Hoogstraten (Noorderkempen).
