= Breda =

- City and municipality
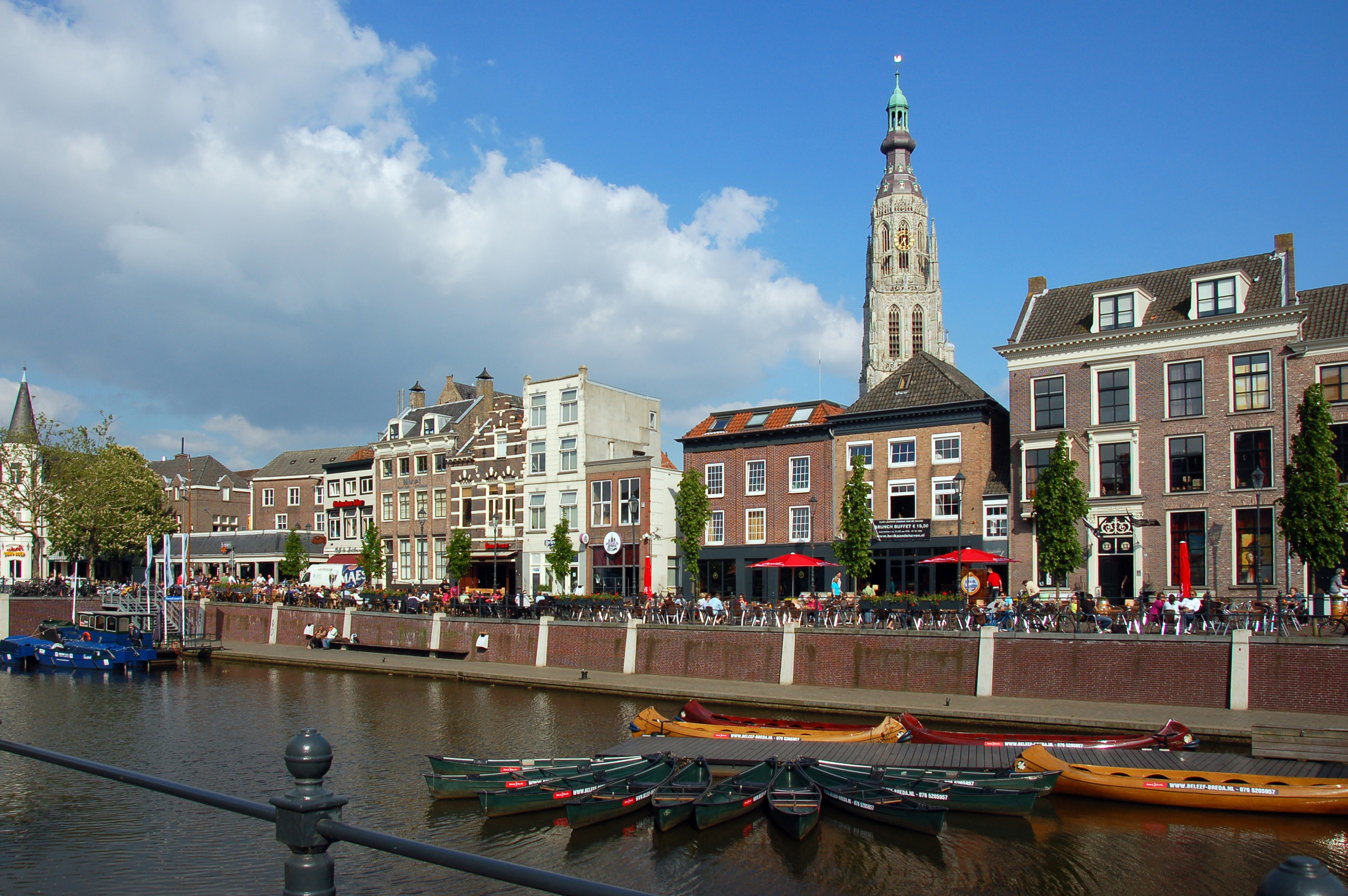
- Docks in the city center

- Flag Coat of arms

- Location in North Brabant
- Interactive map of Breda
- Location within the Netherlands Location within Europe
- Coordinates: 51°35′20″N 04°46′33″E
- Country: Netherlands
- Province: North Brabant

Government
  - Body: Municipal council
  - Mayor: Paul Depla (PvdA)

Area
  - Municipality: 128.68 km^{2} (49.68 sq mi)
  - Land: 125.74 km^{2} (48.55 sq mi)
  - Water: 2.94 km^{2} (1.14 sq mi)
- Elevation: 3 m (9.8 ft)

Population (Municipality, January 2026; Urban and Metro, May 2014)
  - Municipality: 190,204
  - Density: 1,513/km^{2} (3,920/sq mi)
  - Urban: 180,420
  - Metro: 324,812
  - Metro region: 553,706
  - Brabant CMSA: 1,932,055
- Demonym(s): Bredanaar, Bredaër
- Time zone: UTC+1 (CET)
  - Summer (DST): UTC+2 (CEST)
- Postcode: 4800–4841, 4847, 4850–4854
- Area code: 076
- Website: www.breda.nl

Breda (/ˈbreɪdə/ BRAY-də, also UK: /ˈbriːdə/ BREE-də, US: /breɪˈdɑː/ bray-DAH; Dutch: [breːˈdaː]) is a city and municipality in the southern part of the Netherlands, located in the province of North Brabant. The name derived from brede Aa ('wide Aa' or 'broad Aa') and refers to the confluence of the rivers Mark and Aa. Breda has 185,072 inhabitants on 13 September 2022 and is part of the Brabantse Stedenrij; it is the tenth largest city/municipality in the country, and the third largest in North Brabant after Eindhoven and Tilburg. It is equidistant from Rotterdam and Antwerp.

As a fortified city, it was of strategic military and political significance. Although a direct fiefdom of the Holy Roman Emperor, the city obtained a municipal charter; the acquisition of Breda, through marriage, by the House of Nassau ensured that Breda would be at the center of political and social life in the Low Countries. Breda had a population of 190,204 in 2026; the metropolitan area had a population of 324,812.

== History ==
Historical population
Year	Pop.	±% p.a.
1437	4,870	—
1496	6,025	+0.36%
1640	9,500	+0.32%
1740	11,000	+0.15%
1795	8,250	−0.52%
1942	75,694	+1.52%
1945	79,790	+1.77%
1950	89,304	+2.28%
1955	98,050	+1.89%
1960	107,127	+1.79%
1965	115,782	+1.57%
1970	121,209	+0.92%
1975	118,001	−0.54%
1980	117,259	−0.13%
1985	118,974	+0.29%
1990	123,025	+0.67%
1995	129,911	+1.10%
2000	160,615	+4.33%
2005	168,054	+0.91%
2010	173,299	+0.62%
2015	180,937	+0.87%
2020	184,069	+0.34%
2024	188,078	+0.54%
Source: Lourens & Lucassen 1997, pp. 40–41

In the 11th century, Breda was a direct fief of the Holy Roman Emperor, its earliest known lord being Henry of Brunesheim (1080–1125). The first mention of Breda in the historical record was in 1125 by Engelbertus van Breda who was a witness to draw up of a document. The city of Breda obtained a municipal charter in 1252. After that Breda had the rights to build fortifications. The city constructed brick walls and Roman-style gates.

In 1327, Adelheid of Gaveren sold Breda to Duke Johannes III of Brabant. In 1350, the fief was resold to Johannes II of Wassenaar (d. 1377). In 1403, the heiress of his line, Johanna of Polanen (1392–1445), married Engelbert I of Nassau (1370–1442; his sarcophagus is in the Grote Kerk in Breda). Through her, the city came into the possession of the House of Nassau, where it remained until 1795, passing to William I of Orange (1533–1584), stadtholder of Holland, Zeeland, and Utrecht and leader of the Dutch revolt. Thus, the baron of Breda was also Count of Nassau in the Holy Roman Empire, Prince of Orange, and (the main) stadtholder in the Dutch Republic (from 1572 to 1650, 1672–1702, 1747–1795). Breda remained part of the barony of Breda until it was captured by French revolutionary forces in 1795.

=== Residence city ===
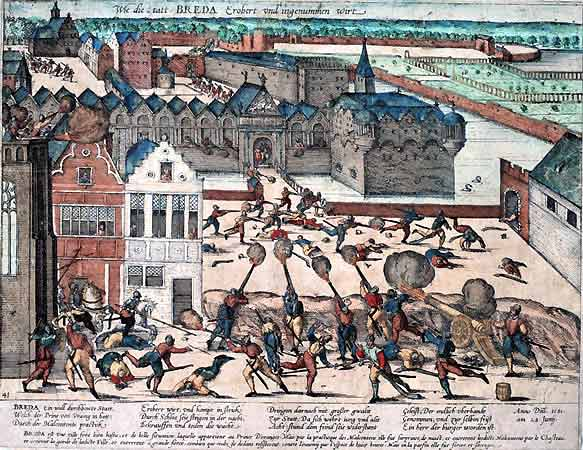
Haultpenne's soldiers vent their fury upon the citizens of Breda in 1581

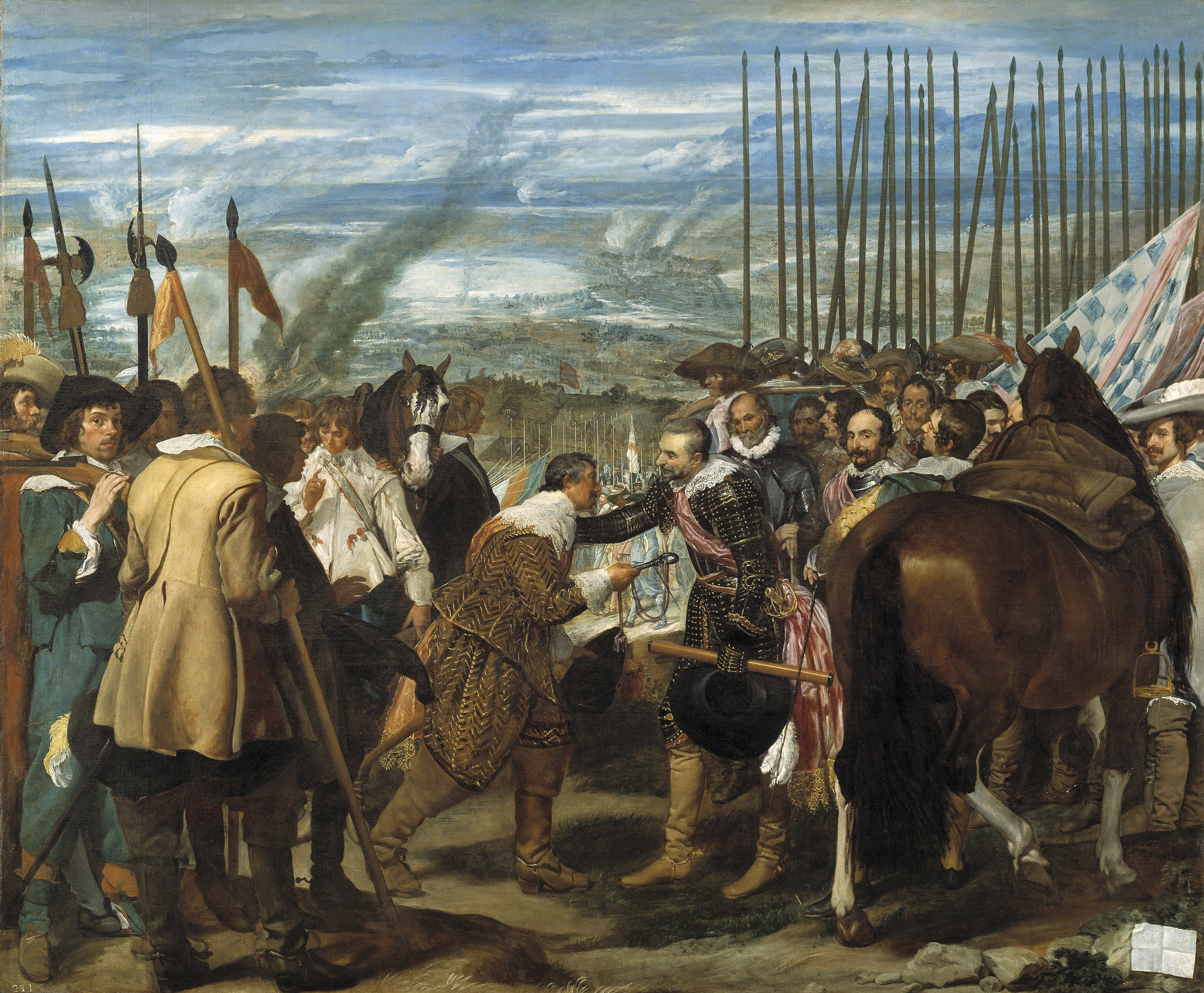
The Surrender of Breda, by Diego Velázquez.

The acquisition of the city by the House of Orange-Nassau marked its emergence as a residentiestad (residence city). The presence of the Orange-Nassau family attracted other nobles, who built palatial residences in the old quarters of the city. The most impressive one, built by the Italian architect Thomas Vincidor de Bologna for the first Dutch prince, was the first renaissance-style palace built north of the Alps. In the 15th century the city's physical, economic and strategic importance expanded rapidly. A great church was built in Brabantine Gothic style with an elegant 97-metre-high (318 ft) tower, called Grote Kerk (main church) or also Onze Lieve Vrouwe Kerk (Church of Our Lady). In 1534 Henry III of Nassau-Breda rebuilt the modest medieval fortifications in impressive style.

In 1534, a fire destroyed over nine tenths of the city, close to 1300 houses, churches, and chapels, and the town hall. Only 150 houses and the main church remained. In July 1581, during the Eighty Years' War, Breda was captured in a surprise attack and siege by Spanish troops then under the command of Claudius van Barlaymont, whose sobriquet was Haultpenne. Although the city had surrendered upon the condition that it would not be plundered, the troops vented their fury upon the inhabitants. In the resulting mayhem, known as Haultpenne's Fury, over 500 citizens were killed. In March 1590, Breda fell back into the hands of the Dutch and Maurice of Nassau, when a 68 men hand-picked force, concealed under the turf of a peat-boat, had contrived to enter the city in a daring plan devised by Adriaen van Bergen, known as the ruse with the Peat Ship of Breda. Around 1610 the construction of the Spanish Gate or "Spanjaardsgat" was started as a remembrance to that successful action.

After a ten-month siege in 1624–25, the city again surrendered to the Spaniards, now led by Spinola; the event was immortalized by Diego Velázquez. In the Siege of Breda of 1637 the city was recaptured by Frederick Henry, Prince of Orange, after a four-month siege, and in 1648 it was finally ceded to the Dutch Republic by the Treaty of Münster.

In 1646, Frederick Henry founded the Orange College of Breda, modelled on Saumur, Geneva, and Oxford, intending it to train young men of good family for the army and the civil service.

=== Stuart exiles ===
The exiled Stuart Charles II of England resided in Breda for a little over a month of his time in exile during the Cromwellian Commonwealth and Protectorate, thanks to the proximity of Charles's sister Mary, Princess Royal and Princess of Orange, the widow of Prince William II of Orange.

Based mostly on suggestions by the Parliamentarian General George Monck, Charles II's Declaration of Breda (1660) announced his conditions for accepting the crown of England, which he was to regain a few months later in the year.

=== Later history ===
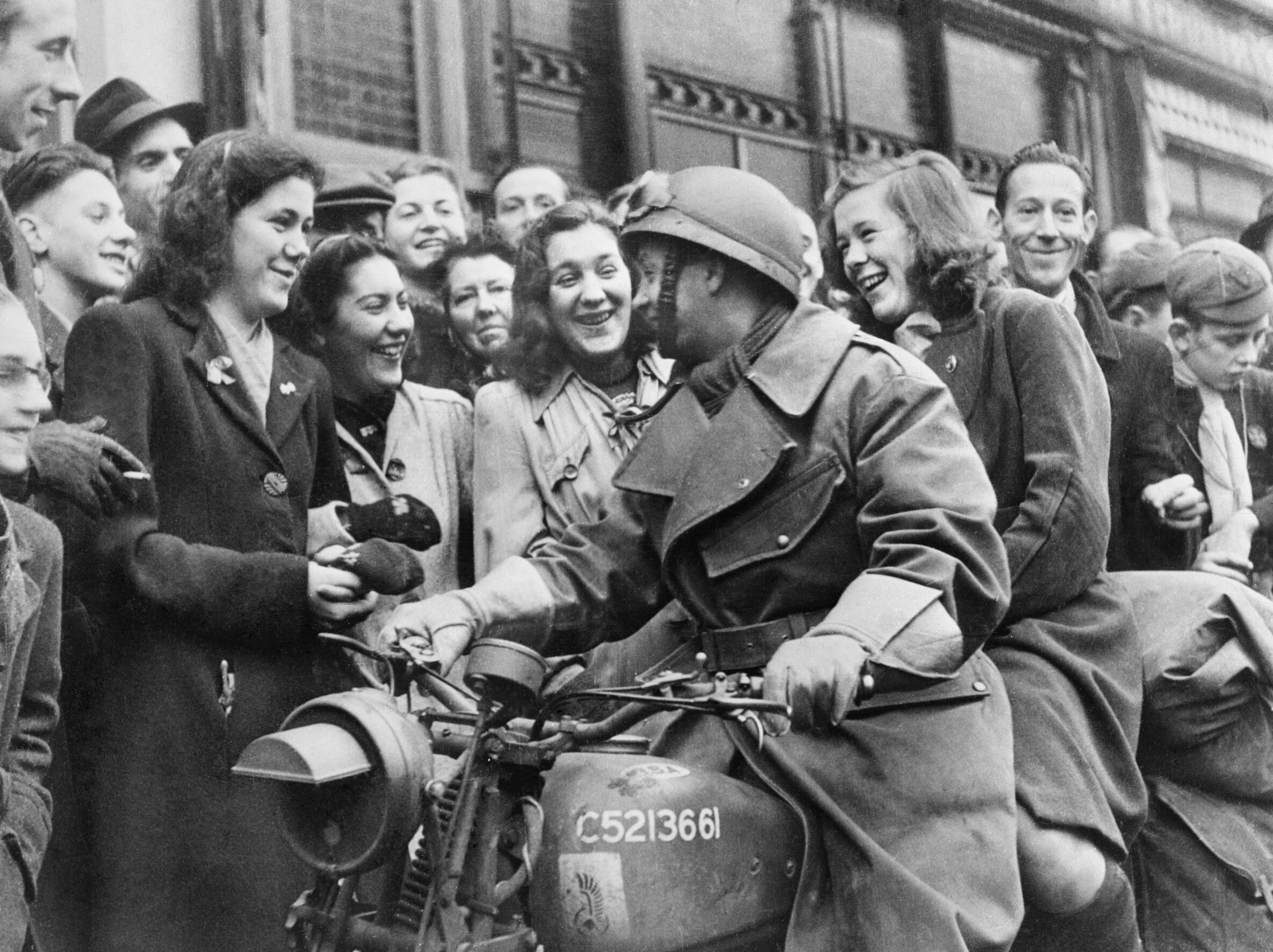
Polish soldiers welcomed by the residents of Breda, 1944

The Treaty of Breda was signed in the city on 31 July 1667, bringing to an end the Second Anglo-Dutch War in which the Dutch faced the same Charles II who had been their guest. Between 1746 and 1748 it was the site of the Congress of Breda, a series of talks between Britain and France aimed at bringing an end to the War of the Austrian Succession, which ultimately led to the signing of the Treaty of Aix-la-Chapelle.

During the Second World War, the city was under German occupation for over four years. During Operation Pheasant Breda was liberated following a successful outflanking manoeuvre planned and performed by forces of 1st Polish Armoured Division of General Maczek on 28 October 1944. Each year during Liberation Day festivities, Breda is visited by a large Polish contingent and the city of Breda reserves a special portion of the festivities for the fallen Polish soldiers. A museum and a monument honoring Maczek and the Polish 1st Armoured Division stands in the city center. General Maczek and many soldiers of his division are buried in the nearby Polish military cemetery.

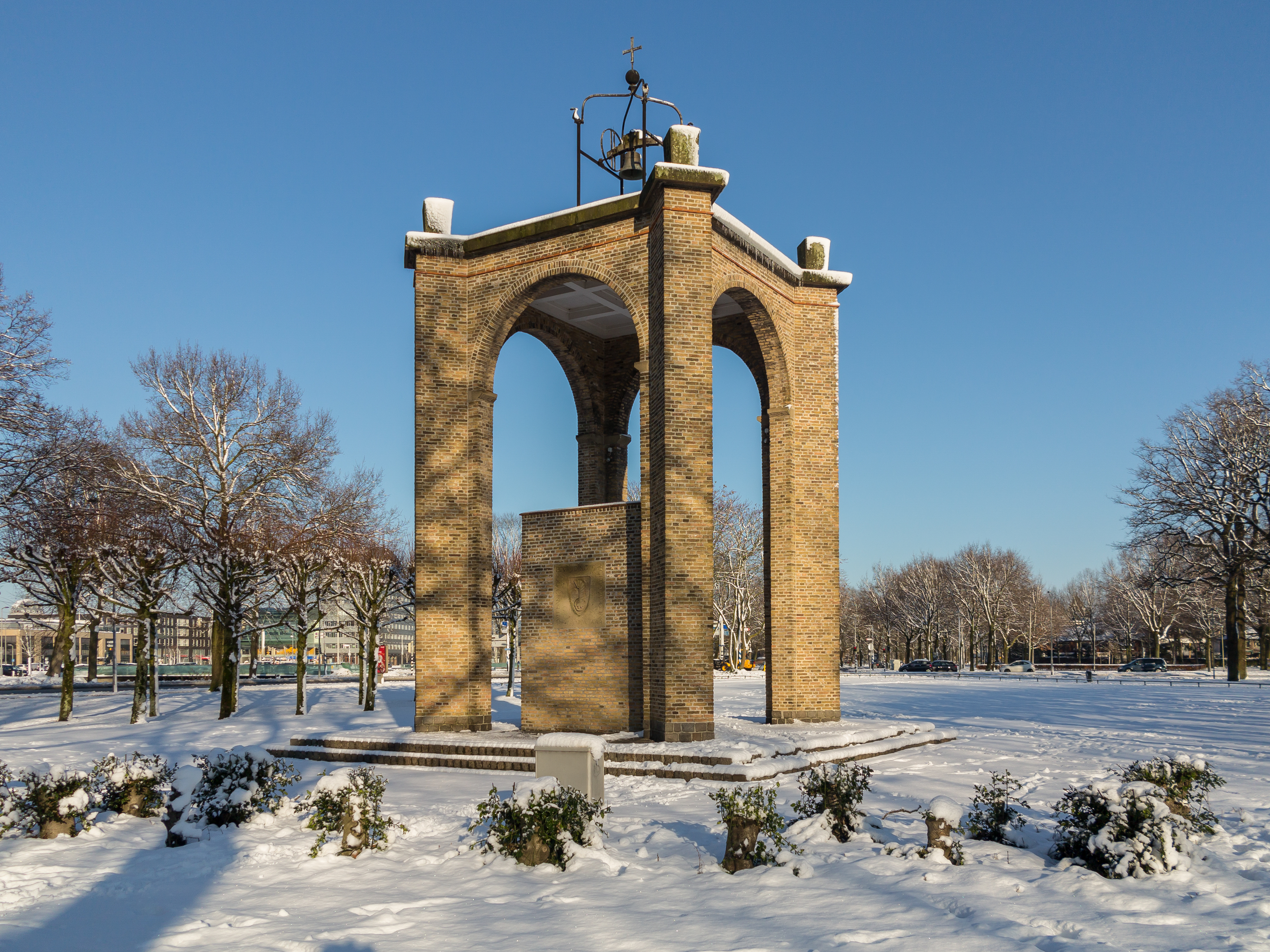
Breda, Polish chapel

Breda was the site of one of the first panopticon prison establishments, Koepelgevangenis. This prison housed German war criminals in the Netherlands for their war crimes during the Second World War. Known as "The Breda Four", or "Vier von Breda", they were Willy Lages, who was released in 1966 due to illness, Joseph Kotalla, who died in prison in 1979, and Ferdinand aus der Fünten and Franz Fischer, who were both released in 1989 and died later the same year.

== Administration ==
- Breda (city) (≈180,000)
  - Ginneken (former village absorbed by city agglomeration)
  - Princenhage (former village absorbed by city agglomeration)
- Prinsenbeek (≈11,500) (added at the municipal reorganization in 1997)
- Bavel (≈7,000) (added at the municipal reorganization in 1997)
- Teteringen (≈6,500) (added at the municipal reorganization in 1997)
- Ulvenhout (≈4,700) (added at the municipal reorganization in 1997)

=== Administration ===
The municipality of Breda is divided in 11 sectors:

1. Breda Centrum (center)
2. Breda Noord ( North)
3. Breda Noord-West (Haagse Beemden) (Northwest)
4. Prinsenbeek
5. Breda West (West), which includes Princenhage and the border crossing 'Hazeldonk'
6. Breda Zuid (South), which includes the Zandberg neighborhood
7. Breda Zuid-Oost (Southeast), which includes Ginneken
8. Ulvenhout
9. Bavel
10. Breda Oost (East)
11. Teteringen

== Topography ==
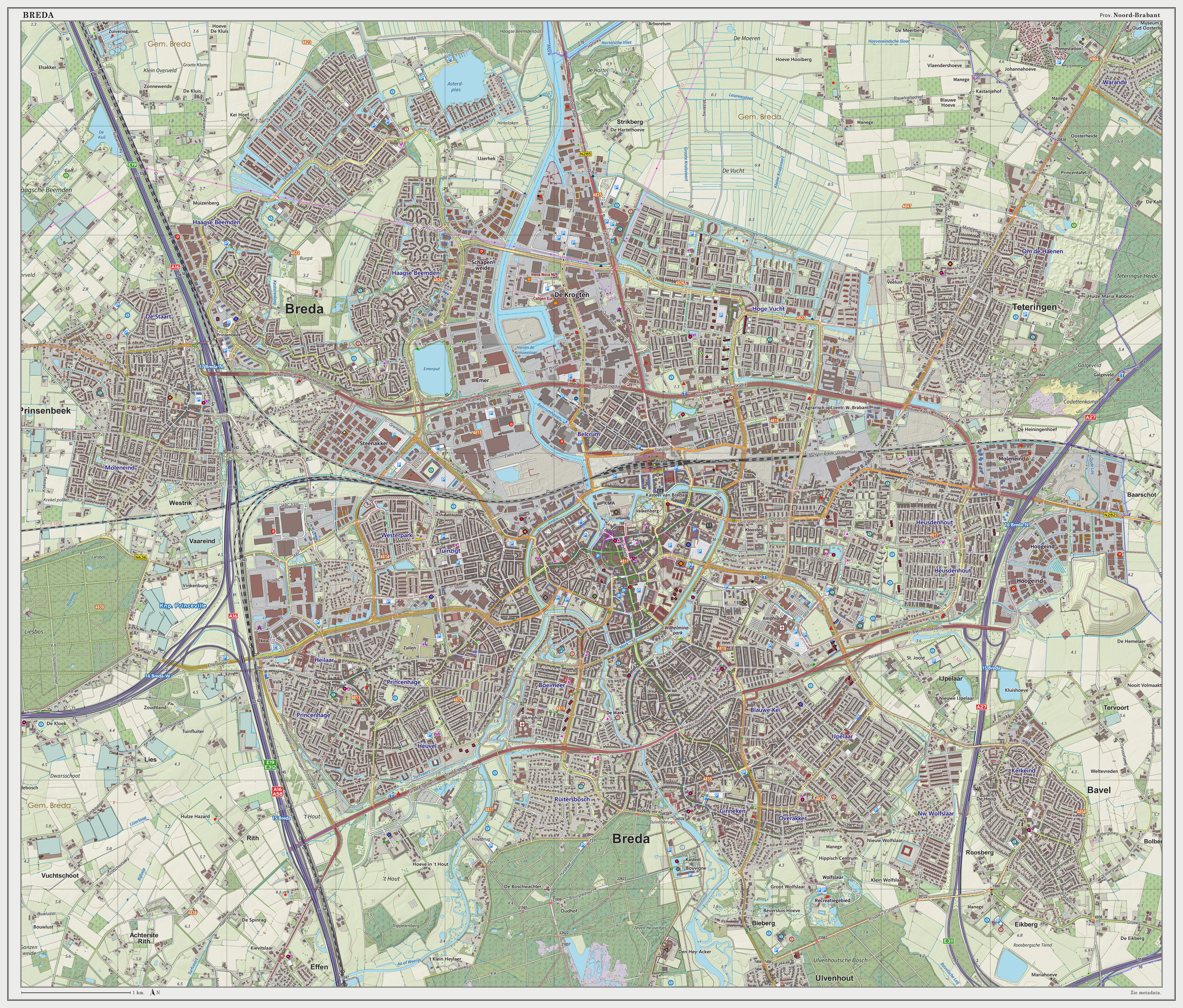

Topographic map image of the city of Breda, March 2014. Click to enlarge.

== Economy ==
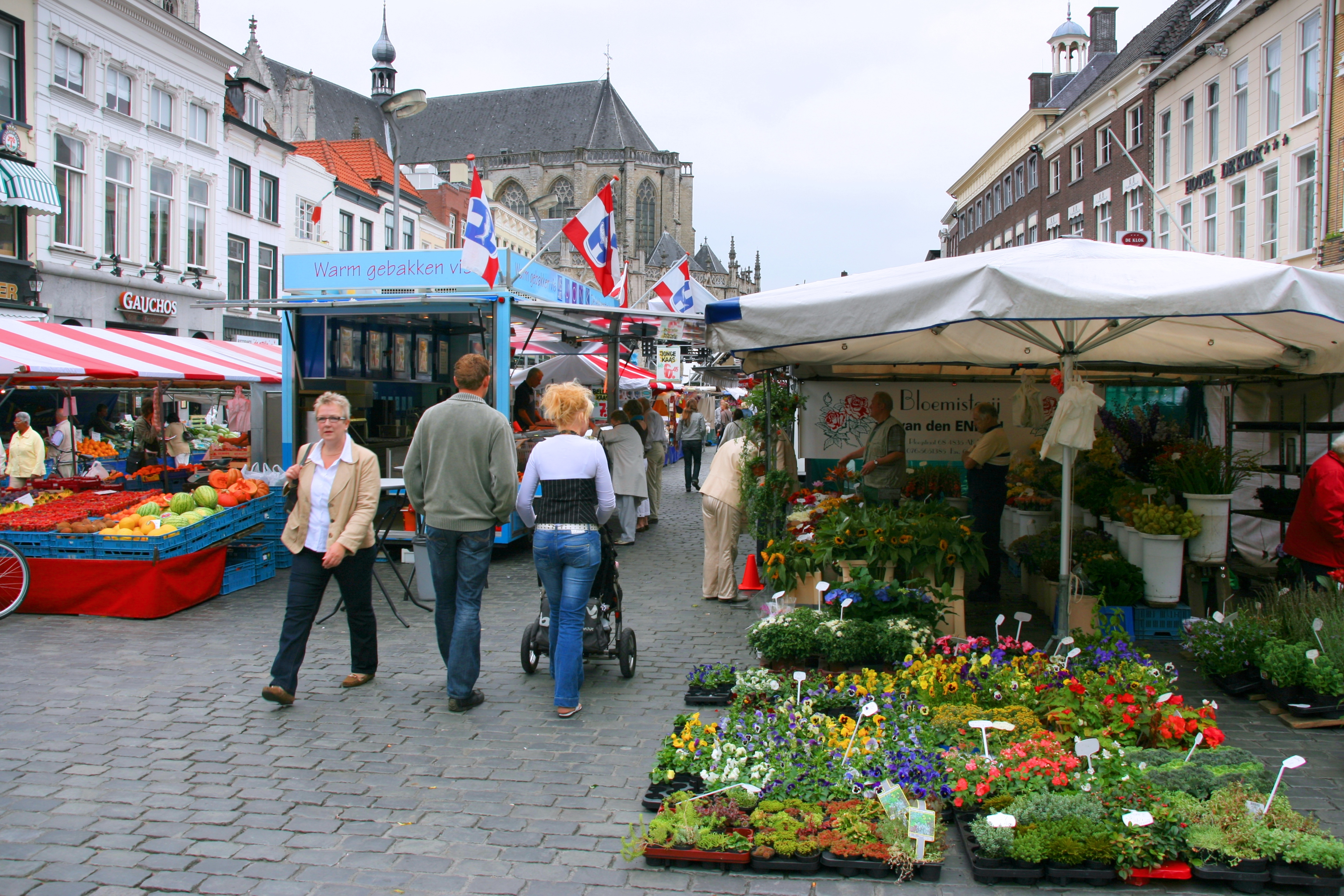
The market at Grote Markt

Historically, economic activities were mainly industrial. Breda was a center of the food- and drink industry. Companies like Hero (lemonade), Van Melle (Mentos), De Faam (liquorice) and Kwatta (chocolate) are famous throughout Western Europe. Breda also had a sugar factory, supplying its best-known products.

Breda formerly housed the largest brewery in the Netherlands (Oranjeboom). The multinational Interbrew took over the brewery in 1995 and then closed it in 2004. Production of the Breda brand was moved to both Bremen and Leuven until 2008, when Randalls Brewery (in Guernsey) acquired the licence. Guernsey is now the only place in the world where draught Breda is brewed.

However, the decline of industrial activity did not harm the city's economy. Nowadays, Breda is a service oriented economy based on business, trade and logistics. A growing number of international companies choose to establish their head office for Benelux operations and manufacturing in Breda. Examples of these companies are 3M, Abbott Laboratories, Alfa Laval, Amgen, ExxonMobil, General Electric, General Motors, Krohne Oil & Gas, Ritchie Bros. Auctioneers, Scania, Texaco, and Toshiba. Also, the food industry is still largely represented by companies such as Anheuser-Busch InBev, Hero Group, Perfetti Van Melle and Royal Cosun. Furthermore, the city is host to the headquarters of the Royal Netherlands Air Force. Because of its central location between the ports of Antwerp and Rotterdam, the city also attracts logistics companies such as Van Wijngen International. Koch Media has its Benelux office in Breda.

The main shopping areas of Breda are the city center and the southern part of Breda. Known shopping centers are De Barones and 't Sas. Major shopping streets are the Eindstraat, Ginnekenstraat, Wilhelminastraat and Ginnekenweg. A market is held on the Grote Markt every Tuesday and Friday from 09:00 to 13:00. A book and antique market is held on Wednesday from 09:00 to 17:00.

== Education ==
Breda became since 1970 a more specific education city and student city. In 2012 there were 27,000 students registered in Middelbaar- and Hoger Onderwijs.

Secondary education consists of;

- vmbo – Pre-vocational secondary education
- vmbo-theoretical or mavo – secondary general continued education
- havo – higher general continued education
- vwo – preparatory scientific education / atheneum / gymnasium

Some schools offer bilingual English/Dutch education.

Secondary schools in Breda;

- Curio (umbrella organization)
  - De Rotonde (special education – services & cuisine, mavo)
  - ISK (international transition school)
  - Praktijkschool (practical special education)
  - Prinsentuin van Cooth (vmbo – agriculture, services and agricultural products, care, mavo)
  - Scala (vmbo – art, theatre, multimedia, entrepreneurship, sports, mavo)
- Koraal Group (umbrella organization, special education)
  - Brederocollege (special education vmbo and havo)
  - De Kei (special education – mavo, havo)
  - Ginnekencollege (education program at juvenile justice institution ‘Den Hey Acker’)
- De Campus (collaboration of three schools)
  - Markenhage (Dalton Plan)
  - Michaël College (Waldorf education)
  - Orion Lyceum (havo, vwo)
- Nassau Scholengemeenschap (mavo, havo, vwo)
- Graaf Engelbrecht College (mavo, havo, vwo dedicated in sports)
- Mencía de Mendoza Lyceum (Dutch & bilingual mavo, havo, vwo, atheneum)
- Newman college (mavo, 'technasium' – havo, atheneum & gymnasium)
- Onze Lieve Vrouwelyceum (havo, atheneum en gymnasium)
- Stedelijk Gymnasium Breda
- Tessenderlandt (vmbo – construction, mobility & transport, catering & recreation, healthcare & welfare, mavo)
  - Christoffel (special education)
- International School Breda (myp)
- Libertad (democratic education)
- Luzac (private school)

=== Vocational education ===
This type of education is called 'Middelbaar Beroepsonderwijs' (MBO).

- De Rooi Pannen (hospitality and cuisine, events catering, tourism, leisure and marketing)
- Curio, Frankenthalerstraat 15 (agriculture, bread and banquet)
- Curio, Markendaalseweg 35 (hospitality, food and lifestyle, facility service)
  - Cas Spijkers Academie (all-round culinary, catering and cuisine)
- SVO (vocational training food)
- Winford Academy (private school)

=== University of Applied Sciences ===
This type of education is called 'Hoger Beroepsonderwijs' (HBO)

- Breda University of Applied Sciences (data science & AI, creative business, games, hotel, facility, logistics, built environment, tourism, leisure & events)
- Avans University of Applied Sciences
  - Environmental Science for Sustainability, Ecosystems and Technology
  - Industrial Engineering and Management
  - International Business and Management Studies
  - International Financial Management
  - Faculty of Military Sciences (part of the Dutch Defense Academy NLDA)
- Academie Sint-Joost (art school – visual arts)

=== Military ===
- Koninklijke Militaire Academie (K.M.A.), NLDA – (service academy, for the Dutch Army, the Dutch Air Force and the Royal Marechaussee)

== Main sights ==
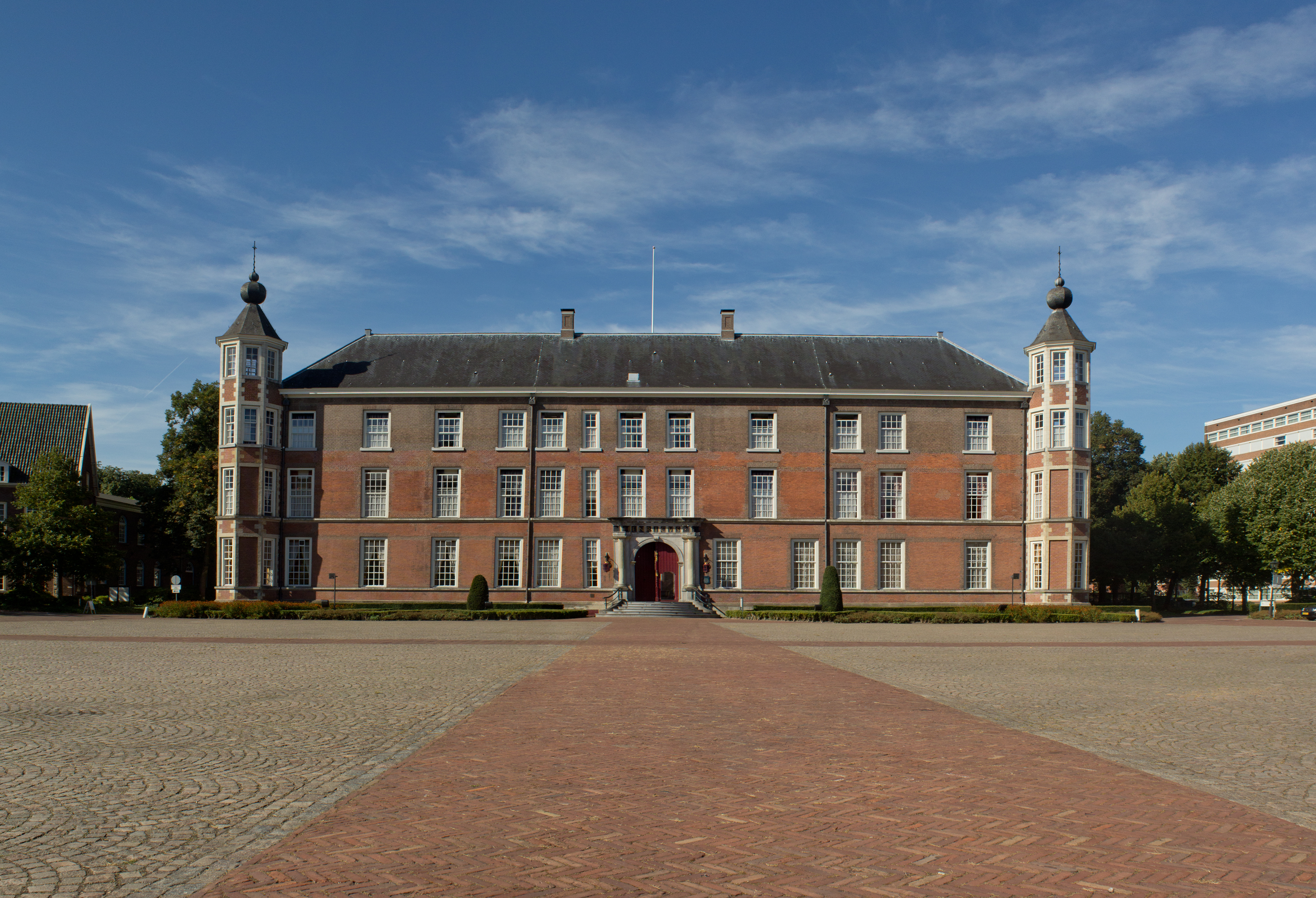
Castle of Breda

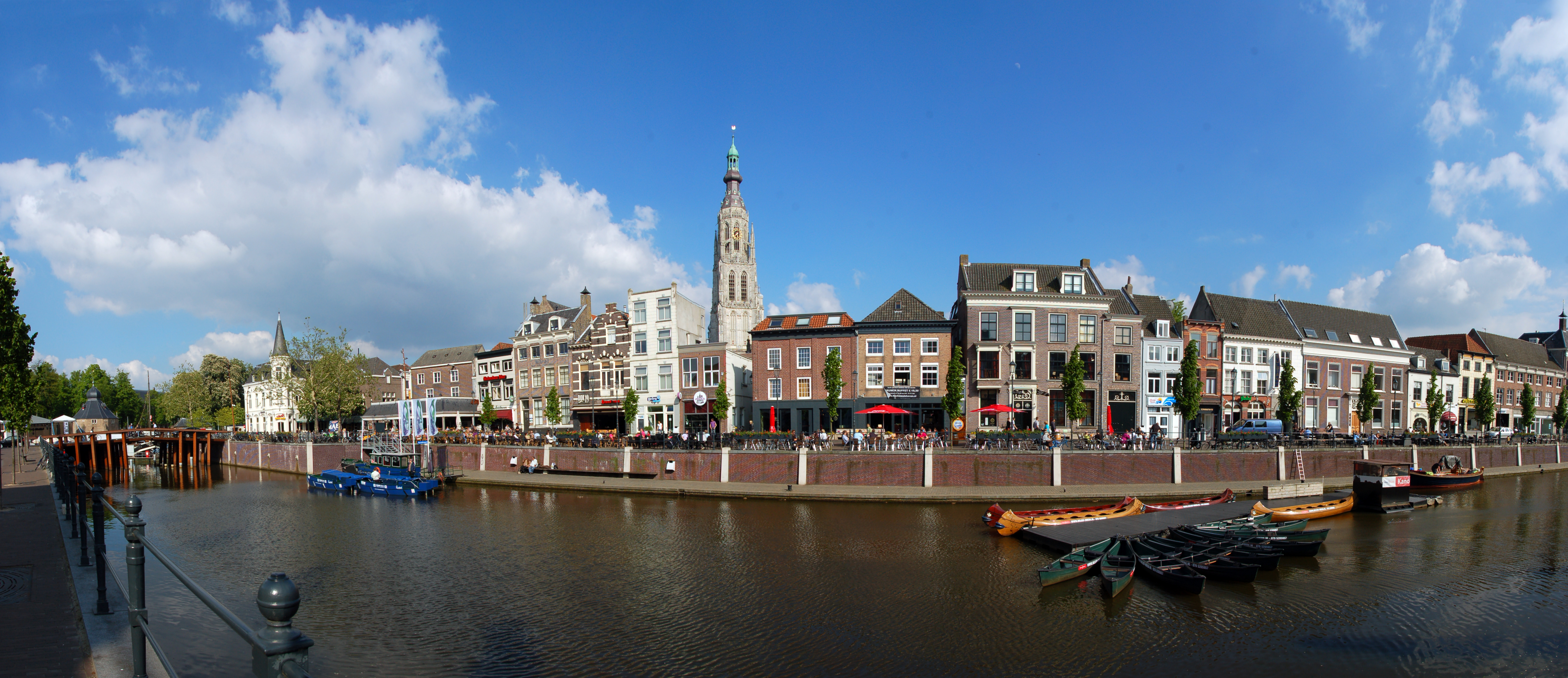
Harbour of Breda

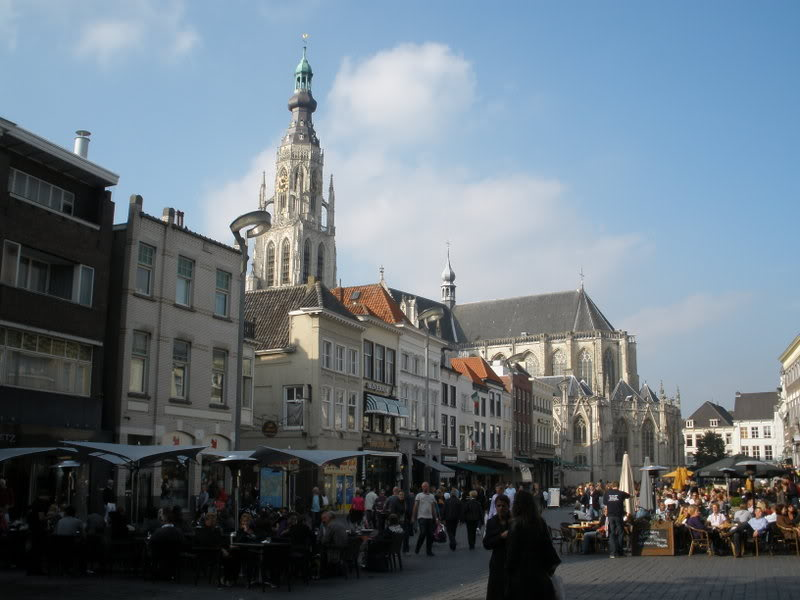
Grote Markt

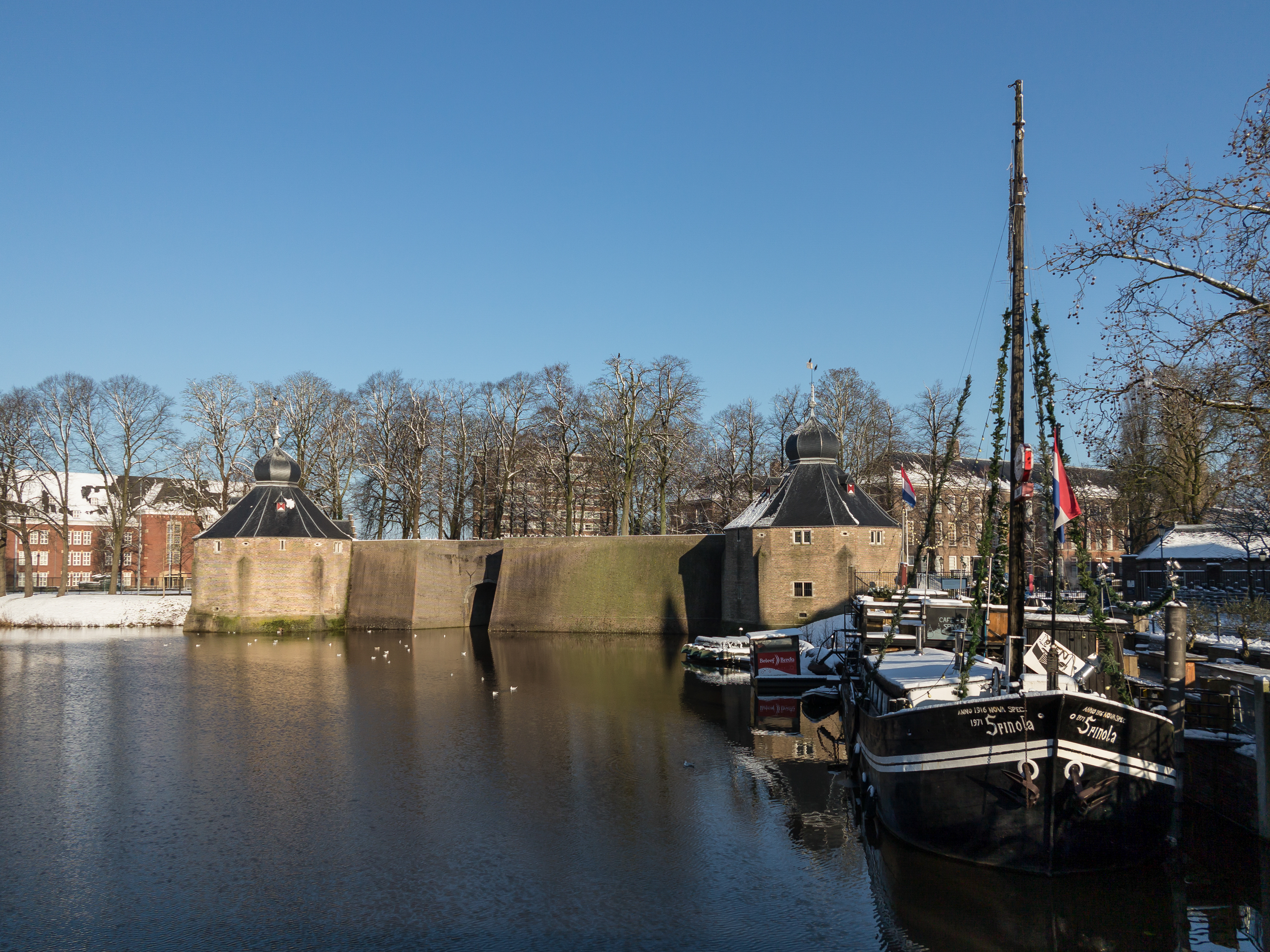
Ancient port: het Spanjaardsgat

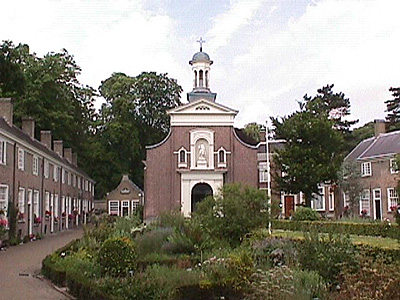
Begijnhof

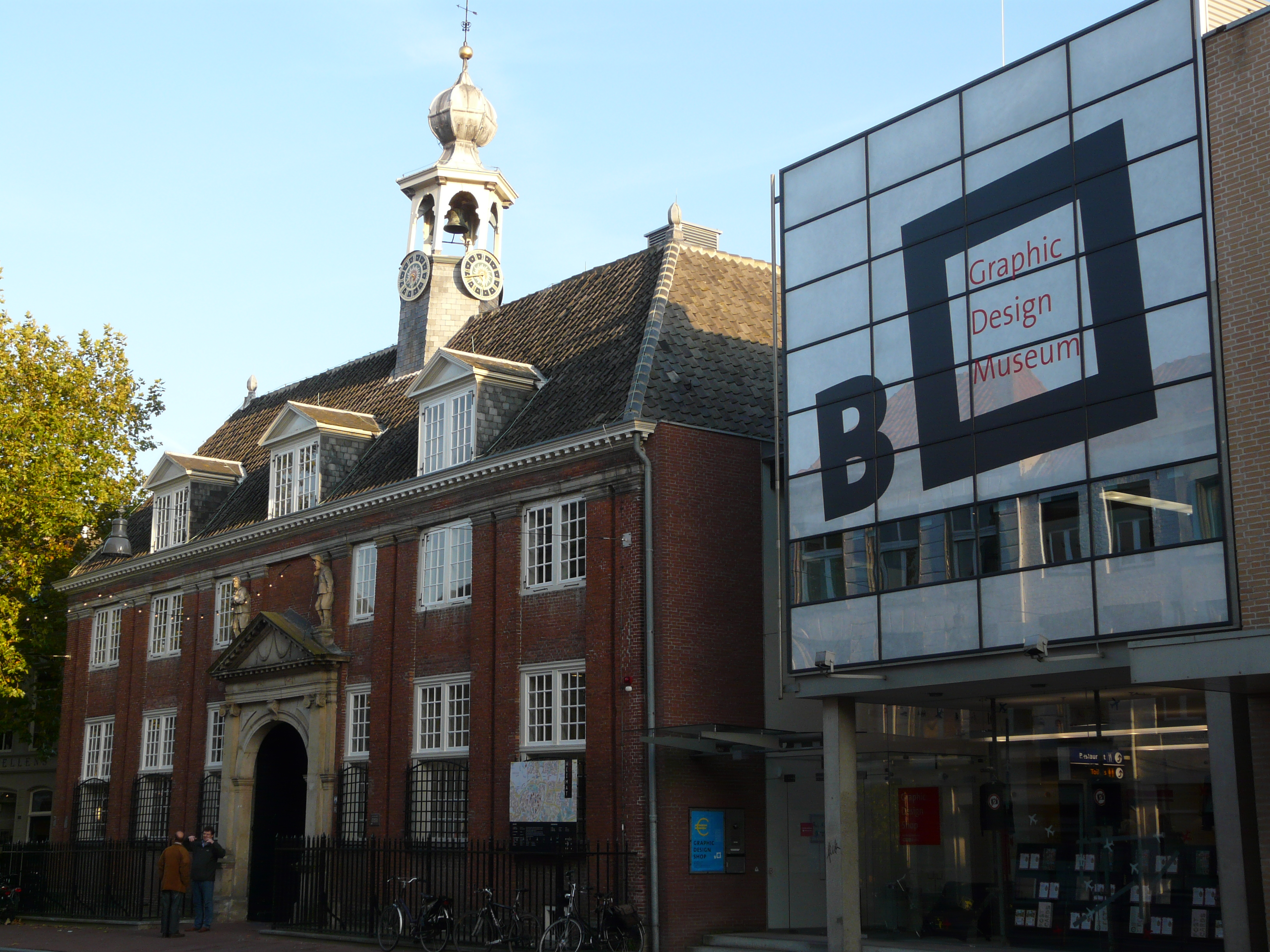
Stedelijk Museum Breda

The city center contains old buildings and portions of the singels (moats) and the harbour. Focal point is the Grote Markt, the main square with pubs and sidewalk cafes.

Park Valkenberg is a major public park, halfway between the main railway station Breda and the Grote Markt.

Major historic buildings include:

- The Grote Kerk (Great Church) or Onze Lieve Vrouwe Kerk (Church of Our Lady), a major example of the Brabant style of Gothic Architecture.
- The Castle of Breda (houses the K.M.A).
- The Bouvigne Castle (house the 'Brabantse Delta Water Board' since 1972)
- The Begijnhof, a Beguinage.
- Saint Anthony's Cathedral (Sint-Antoniuskathedraal), the cathedral church of the Catholic Diocese of Breda.
- City hall.
- The Spanjaardsgat, a 16th-century water gate (part of the K.M.A. complex)
- The Koepelgevangenis (Koepelprison).

== Culture ==
The spoken dialect is West Brabantian, which is very similar to colloquial Dutch.

=== Carnaval ===
As in other cities and villages in the south of the Netherlands, 40 days before Easter the citizens of Breda celebrate Carnaval. A four day chain of foolish events, silliness, nonsensical costumes and a small beer on the side. During the event the mayor of the city, symbolically turns over the keys to the city to “Prince Carnaval” and his ‘Council of 11’. Breda has 4 festive monarchs, the Prince of Breda, Princenhage, Haagse Beemden and the Baron of Ginneken. For the occasion the city is renamed to ‘Kielengat’.

Musically, the carnaval events traditionally are enlivened by wind bands called ‘Dweilorkesten' (Mop Orchestra’s). All pubs and bars participate in the event and on Sunday and Monday a large parade of floats and foolish creations slides through the streets. The events ends on the evening before Ash Wednesday (Shrove Tuesday). The exclusive TV channel 'BaronieTV' broadcasts the events throughout the 'Barony of Breda'.

=== Theaters ===
- Chassé Theater (large regional theater and concert venue)
- Nieuwe Veste (art & music center, concert house and music school)
- Podium Bloos (cultural venue, dance, stage play, music and literature)
- De Stilte (dance company and theater)
- Muzipo (puppet theatre)
- Poppodium Mezz (concert venue)
- Sound Dog (concert venue)
- Poppodium Phoenix (concert venue)
- Avenue (dinner show theatre & restaurant)
- De Koe (social cultural center, concert venue)

=== Cinemas ===
- Chassé Cinema (film house connected to Chassé Theater)
- Filmhuis Breda (independent cultural film house)
- Pathé Breda
- Kinepolis Breda

=== Music festivals ===
- Breda Jazz Festival
- Breda Barst (free rock festival)
- Breda Live
- Breda Dancetour (dance festival)
- Spanjaardsgat Festival (classical music festival on a flouting stage in the old harbor)
- Ploegendienst (dance festival)
- Parkies (traveling summer festival)
- Duikboot Festival
- Tranen van Van Cooth (Levenslied festival)
- 538 Koningsdag – April 27, "national" kings birthday party organized by Radio 538
- Breda Drijft – (Breda Floats, music festival on the moats)

=== Museums ===
Breda hosts the following museums:

- Begijnhof Breda Museum (Beguinage museum)
- Generaal Maczek Museum (museum dedicated to General Maczek)
- Maczek Memorial Breda (memorial and graveside of General Maczek)
- Bier Reclame Museum (Beer advertising museum & bar)
- NAC Museum (museum of NAC Breda)
- Heemkundig Museum Paulus van Daesdonck (historical museum)
- Museum Oorlog & Vrede (War and Peace Museum)
- Stedelijk Museum Breda (historical municipal museum)
- Princenhaags Museum (historical village museum)

=== Other notable events ===
- BredaPhoto (outdoor photo exposition)
- Graphic Matters (graphic design festival)
- Cultuurnacht (culture night)
- Lichtsloepen Parade (illuminated boat parade)
- Brabantse Kastelendag (provincial open castle day)
- International Film Festival Breda
- Stripbeurs (comic book convention)

=== Harley Day ===
The Harley Dag was one of the biggest one-day motorcycle events of Europe, held on the third Sunday of August. The American motorcycle brands Harley Davidson and Indian were the main guests of the day. Other American brands were also welcomed to the city center. All other brands had to park at a dedicated parking outside the city center. At the peak over 10,000 motorcycles visited the city and attracted an audience of a 100,000 people. 2010 was the 22nd and last official edition.

=== Roodharigedag ===
Redhead Day (nl; Roodharigedag) is a festival that between 2007 and 2011 took place in Breda during first weekend of September. Since 2019 the festival relocated to Tilburg. The two-day festival is a gathering of people with natural red hair, but is also focused on art related to the colour red. Activities during the festival are lectures, workshops and demonstrations. The festival attracts attendance from 20 countries and was free due to sponsorship of the local government. Furthermore, some people referred to Breda as the opposite of burning man. As the festival grew bigger they needed a new spot to host the ever growing event.

== Sports ==
=== Football ===
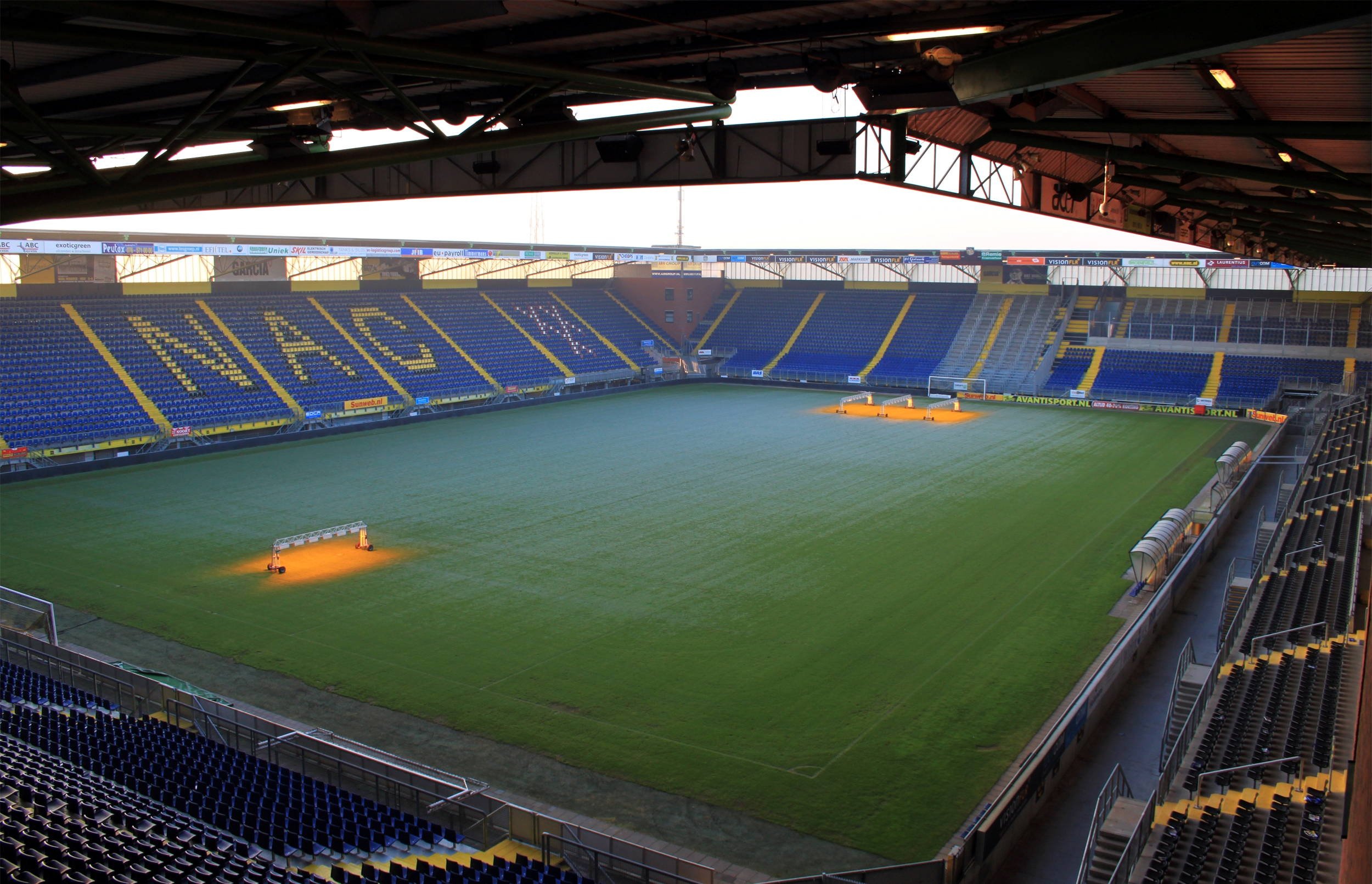
Rat Verlegh Stadion

Breda's only professional football club, is NAC Breda. The club plays in the Eredivisie and their home stadion is the Rat Verlegh Stadion. The club became National Champion, once in 1921. The former Cadet football association ‘Velocitas’ of the military academy won the Holdertbeker (the predecessor of the KNVB Cup) in 1899-1900.

Besides NAC there are more amateur football clubs among others;

- v.v. Baronie
- RKVV JEKA
- RKSV Groen Wit
- SAB (voetbalclub)
- SV Advendo
- The Gunners

=== Hockey ===
Breda also plays a big role in the hockey department. B.H.V. Push supplied high-level players to the national women and men teams of the Netherlands and played in the Hoofdklasse them self. A few of Push’s national team players for example are: Bram Lomans, Matthijs Brouwer, Thom van Dijck, Joep de Mol, Floris Wortelboer, Teun Beins, Cécile Vinke and Malou Pheninckx.

- BNMHC Zwart-Wit
- BH & BC Breda (hockey & bandy club)

=== Athletics ===
Breda's athletics club, A.V. Sprint, is with around 2000 members, the largest club of its kind in the Netherlands. Beside the usual athletics sports at their own track, they offer, Nordic walking, tai chi, bootcamp and parasports.

=== Other sports ===
- SBC2000 (water polo, swimming, diving)
- Breda's Rugby club
- Breda's Golden Glory (kickboxing camp)
- Bredase Bowling Vereniging, playing in the first European bowling alley
- Boxing association 'Bredase Ring'
- Fier (artistic gymnastics)
- Roller derby Breda
- Cadetten Roei – en Zeilvereniging 'Dudok van Heel' (Rowing and Sailing, Military academy)
- BRESS, Bredase Student Sports

=== Venues ===
- Municipally Sport center Breda a.k.a. ‘De Scharen’
- de Drie Linden, Prinsenbeek
- de Doelen, Princenhage
- Bruut (bouldering)
- Zwembad Sonsbeeck (swimming pool)
- Sports Boulevard
  - Schaats- en Racketcentrum Breda (iceskating, racket sports)
  - Zwembad De Wisselaar (swimming pool)
  - Wielerbaan Breda (cycle sport)

=== Sport events ===
- Singelloop

Every year in October, the Bredase Singelloop is a major road running event on the half marathon distance with a field of national and international athletes. Similar events are held in Princenhage (10 van 't Aogje) and Haagse Beemden (Haagse Beemden Loop) although the maximum distances are 10 kilometer.

- Outdoor Brabant

The equestrian sports event Outdoor Brabant started out as "Military Breda" in the woods around Galder and a Four-in-hand Combined driving competition, near the village Princenhage. Later these merged and both moved to the southwest of Princenhage where the event changed into "Breda Hippique". The event consists of dressage, eventing, show jumping, and Combined driving. For a couple of years the event was free of charge to the public, due to sponsoring by a major bank. When the sponsorship ended a relative high fee was charged to enter the event.

==== Para sports ====
- Special Olympics Nationale Spelen

In 2024 together Breda and Tilburg host the Special Olympics National Games. The biggest national sports event aseptically for people with a mental disability. 2500 athletes competed in 21 sports.

- European Para Championships

Between August 8 and 20, 2023, the European Para Championships were held in Breda. 1,500 athletes from 45 countries participated in the event.

- ParaGamesBreda

In 2011, the ParaGamesBreda received 3,000 athletes from 40 countries.

==== UEFA Women's Championship 2017 ====
In 2017 the NAC Breda Stadion was one of the hosts of the Women's European Football Championship. Together with Enschede, Deventer, Rotterdam, Tilburg, Doetinchem and Utrecht. The Dutch women won the tournament in the De Grolsch Veste in Enschede.

== Demographics ==
=== Religion ===
Religions in Breda (2014)
1. No affiliation (44.9%)
2. Roman Catholic (41.8%)
3. Protestant Church in the Netherlands (6.00%)
4. Other Christian denominations (2.60%)
5. Islam (3.60%)
6. Hinduism (0.60%)
7. Buddhism (0.50%)

In 2014, the largest religion in Breda was Christianity, comprising 50.4% of its population. The next largest faith is Islam adhered to by 3.6% of residents. Religiously unaffiliated people made up 44.9% of the population.

=== Ethnic groups ===
The ethnic make-up of Breda, in 2020, was as follows:

- Dutch (140,312) (75.45%)
- Moroccans (5,712) (3.1%)
- Indonesians (5,332) (2.9%)
- Turks (3,080) (1.7%)
- Belgians (2,940) (1.6%)
- Germans (2,661) (1.5%)
- Antilleans/Arubans (2,211) (1.2%)
- Polish (2,165) (1.2%)
- Surinamese (2,058) (1.1%)
- Irish (65) (0.08%)

== Notable residents ==
- Charles II of England, lived in Breda for most of his exile during the period of the Commonwealth of England. His sister, Mary, Princess Royal and Princess of Orange was widow of Stadtholder William II, Prince of Orange and co-regent for their son William III sovereign Prince of Orange and later King of England, Scotland and Ireland.
- Stadtholder William the Silent, Prince of Orange, 'Lord of Breda' and his wife Anna van Egmont, Princess consort of Orange, had their residence at the Breda Castle. Anna is buried in the Prince chapel at the Grote Kerk.
- René of Chalon, the first of the Nassau family bearing the tile 'Prince of Orange', was born and lived in the Breda Castle. He passed the title to his paternal cousin William of Nassau-Dillenburg (William the Silent).
- Although neither of them were long-term residents of Breda, it was there, in 1618, that the young René Descartes (at the time, a soldier in the army of Prince Maurice of Nassau) first met, and had extensive conversations with, Dutch philosopher, mathematician, and scientist Isaac Beeckman (then temporarily resident in the town). This interaction with Beeckman seems to have changed the course of Descartes’ intellectual life, eventually leading him to the major innovations in mathematics, science, and philosophy for which he is famous.
- Jan Ingenhousz FRS (1730–1799), physiologist, biologist and chemist, was born in Breda
- "Colonel" Thomas Parker, the manager of Elvis Presley, born and raised in Breda as Andreas Cornelius van Kuijk.
- Adriaen Cornelissen van der Donck (c. 1618–1655), first lawyer in the Dutch colony of New Amsterdam; a polyglot
- Breda is the birthplace and home to several internationally famous electronic dance music artists including R3hab, Dannic, W&W along with former World No.1 DJs — Tiësto and Hardwell. The title of their 2011 collaboration track, Zero 76 is derived from the dialing code of Breda.
- Breda is also the birthplace of former Olympic swimmer Karin Brienesse and former field hockey player Remco van Wijk, who twice won the gold medal at the Summer Olympics with the Dutch National Team: 1996 and 2000.
- Sculptor Jan De Swart, born in Ginneken, a suburb of Breda, and lived in the area until he emigrated to The United States in 1929
- Pioneering Dutch composer Jan Ingenhoven (1876-1951) was born in Breda, and it's the city where the Dutch composers Daan Manneke and Kristoffer Zegers live.
- Thomas Simon Cool, Dutch historical and genre painter, resided and taught in Breda 1866-1870
- The Dutch football international Pierre van Hooijdonk played in Breda. Other formerly international Dutch football players from NAC Breda were Antoon (Rat) Verlegh, Kees Rijvers, Kees Kuijs, Leo Canjels, Daan Schrijvers, Frans Bouwmeester, Nico Rijnders, Ad Brouwers, Bertus Quaars, Martin Vreysen and Ton Lokhoff.
- Ramon Dekkers, Muay Thai and Kickboxing World Champion, was born and died in Breda
- Guido Weijers, famous Dutch stand-up comedian
- Virgil van Dijk, Dutch professional footballer playing center-back for Liverpool
- Sylvie Meis, Dutch television personality, model and ex-wife of football player Rafael van der Vaart was born in Breda
- Pieter Bruegel the Elder, famous Netherlandish painter
- Paul Verschuren, born in Breda, Roman Catholic Bishop of Helsinki from 1967 to 1998
- Josine van Dalsum (1948-2000), Dutch actress

== Transportation ==
=== Trains ===
Breda has two railway stations, Breda and Breda-Prinsenbeek, providing ’Sprinter’ and Inter-city connections throughout the Netherlands.

Inter-city destinations from Breda to the North are Rotterdam, Den Haag and Amsterdam; east to Tilburg, Eindhoven, Den Bosch, Nijmegen and Zwolle; west to Roosendaal and Vlissingen.

The regional Sprinter-trains connect the smaller towns, Gilze en Rijen, Etten-Leur, Lage Zwaluwe and Dordrecht with Breda. The Breda-Prinsenbeek railway station is only served by Sprinter-trains.

The 'Intercity direct' uses the HSL-Zuid for a high-speed connection with the Rotterdam Centraal station, Schiphol Airport and Amsterdam Centraal station. Between Rotterdam and Schiphol there is an extra surcharge for this train.

The international train from Amsterdam to Brussels-South railway station also stops in Breda and connects the city with these destinations via the Schiphol–Antwerp high-speed railway. The train is operated by a corporation between NS International and the National Railway Company of Belgium (NMBS).

=== Buses ===
There are four kinds of buses in Breda: citybuses, regional, intercity and international. City and regional buses are operated by Arriva under the alias 'Bravo' (BRAbant Vervoert Ons).

Citybuses drive only within the city of Breda;

- 1 – Hoge Vucht <-> Breda bus station <-> Nieuw Wolfslaar / Bavel
- 2 – Hoge Vucht <-> Breda bus station <-> Haagse Beemden
- 4 – Princenhage <-> Breda bus station <-> Haagse Beemden
- 5 – Breda bus station <-> Heusdenhout
- 6 – Breda bus station <-> Meersel-Dreef
- 7 – Nieuw Wolfslaar <-> Breda bus station <-> Heusdenhout
- 8 – Breda bus station <-> Breda University of Applied Sciences (Ignatiusstraat)
- 9 – Breda bus station <-> Avans University of Applied Sciences

Regional buses provide connections to nearby towns and cities;

- 115 – Zundert
- 119 – Zevenbergen
- 177 – Zevenbergen, Klundert, Fijnaart
- 122 – Hooge Zwaluwe, Lage Zwaluwe
- 130 – Rijen, Gilze
- 132 – Chaam, Baarle-Nassau/Baarle-Hertog
- 216 – Etten-Leur (departure near Breda-Prinsenbeek train station)
- 311 – Etten-Leur (center), Oudenbosch, Oud Gastel
- 312 – Etten-Leur, Roosendaal
- 316 – Etten-Leur (north)
- 325 – Oosterhout (Hoofseweg / Het Goorke)
- 326 – Oosterhout, Geertruidenberg
- 327 – Oosterhout, Tilburg
- 615 – Zundert, Berkenring – Breda, Mencia de Mendoza (student bus runs twice a day)

The more luxurious intercity buses, called 'Brabantliner' connect Breda with both Gorinchem (402) and Utrecht (400 & 401). These lines are a compensation for the lack of direct train connection between the cities.

There was also a Zeelandic busline (19) which connected Hulst (Zeelandic Flanders) and Breda via Antwerp, Belgium. The line was operated by Connexxion and in the past by the Belgian De Lijn. After 71 years the line was canceled in 2024.

International buses are operated by several providers. From the international bus stop at the Breda railway station, multiple options are possible.

Low-cost intercity bus service FlixBus provides a regular timetable to Bercy, Seine via Antwerp or Gent-Dampoort. In addition, two routes to the Romanian capital Bucharest. Either via Antwerp – Maastricht – Aachen or via Eindhoven – Düsseldorf to Cologne/Bonn Airport station – Frankfurt am Main Hbf to Passau, with the final station Autogara Militari. The company also offers a tree times a week services to Brussels-North railway station from the Breda-Prinsenbeek international bus stop.

The BlaBlaCar bus provides an (almost) daily timetable between Breda – Utrecht – Amsterdam – Schiphol and Sloterdijk in the early morning. In addition, BlaBlaCar bus provides an international timetable to Antwerp – Brussels, Center – Brussels-South railway station – Paris, Gare de Paris Bercy with the final station at Paris, Charles de Gaulle Airport.

Flibco offers an airport shuttle service from Breda to Brussel, Zaventem Airport and Paris, Charles de Gaulle Airport.

=== Roads ===
- The A16 / E19 is a motorway in the west, going northbound to Rotterdam and southbound to the Belgian border at Hazeldonk/Meer following in the direction of Antwerp, Brussels as A1 and through to Paris as E19.
- In the East the A27 / E311 is also a motorway to the north; It connects Breda with Utrecht and Almere.
- Passing South of the city, the A58 connects Breda with Tilburg and Eindhoven in an easterly direction and Roosendaal, Bergen op Zoom, Middelburg and Vlissingen in a westerly direction.
- Further north of Breda runs the A59 from 's-Hertogenbosch to Willemstad, following as N59 to Zierikzee.

The Interchanges 'Sint-Annabosch' (A58/A27), 'Galder' (A16/A58), 'Zonzeel' (A16/A59) and 'Hooipolder' (A27/A59) connecting them all.

=== Waterway ===
The city owes its existence to the accessibility by water. As from the beginning of the city, the rivers Mark and Aa were used for trading and supplying the city. Today the city is accessible for pleasure boating from the north. There is an open connection to the Volkerak via the Mark and connection to the Wilhelmina Canal through the Mark Canal. The Dintel/Mark is accessible for cargo ships up to 86 meters (282 ft) long from Dintelsas to Breda. The 'Werve' yacht port provides a berth for passing pleasure ships just north of the city center.

=== Airport ===
The small airport Breda International Airport is located west of the city. The airport was opened in 1949 as Seppe Airfield and is in limited use for civil aviation. Amsterdam's Schiphol Airport is fairly used by residents in the city as it provides most destinations worldwide. It is located 112 km (70 mi) north of Breda. NS operates direct train services between Breda and Schiphol.

== Twin towns – sister cities ==
Breda is twinned with:

- Diest, Belgium
- Brussels, Belgium
- Dillenburg, Germany
- Orange, France
- Wrocław, Poland
