= Zandberg, North Brabant =

Neighborhood in Breda, Netherlands

Coordinates: 51°34′37″N 4°46′59″E

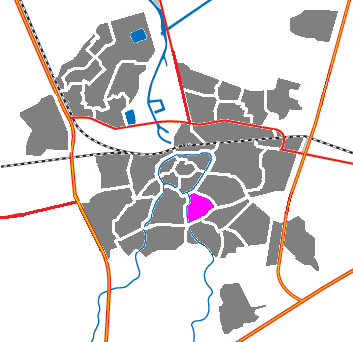
location of Zandberg in Breda

Zandberg is a neighbourhood and residential district to the southeast of the city centre of Breda, an extension raised in the 1920s and 1930s. It is only one of four parts of one of the seven greater quarters of that city, officially called 'Breda East' (Breda Oost).

== History ==
Zandberg is the home of the "Sacramentskoor", the choir of the 1926 Sacrament Church; it is one of the few semi-professional all male choirs in the Netherlands.
