= Thom van Dijck =

Dutch hockey player (1929–2021)

Personal information
- Nationality: Dutch
- Born: 7 August 1929 Ginneken en Bavel, Netherlands
- Died: 12 September 2021 (aged 92)

Sport
- Sport: Field hockey

Thom van Dijck (7 August 1929 – 12 September 2021) was a Dutch field hockey player. He competed in the men's tournament at the 1960 Summer Olympics.
