= Hazeldonk/Meer =

Hazeldonk
- Industrial area
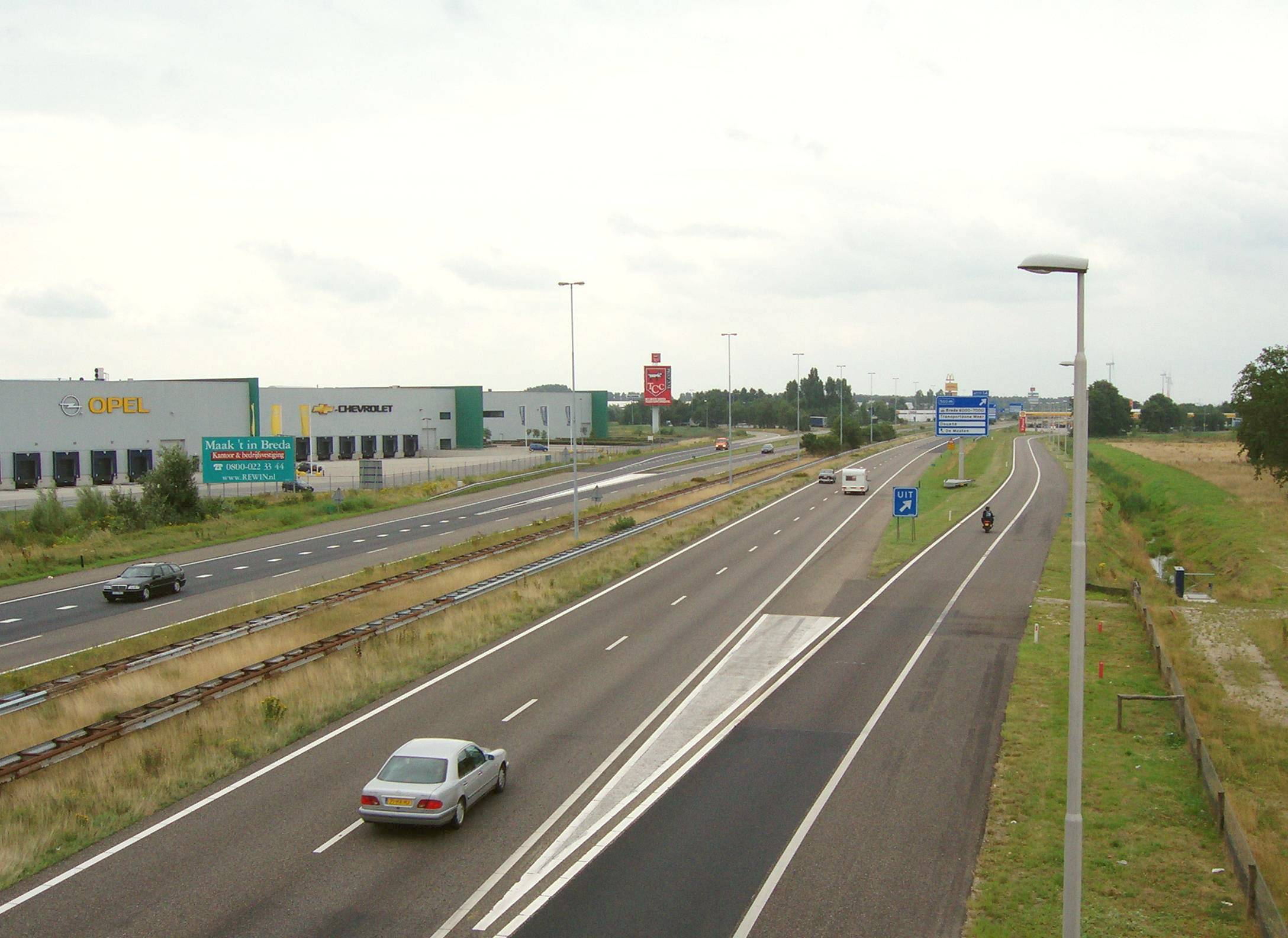
- Motorway A16 at Hazeldonk

- Location in the province of North Brabant in the Netherlands Hazeldonk (Netherlands)
- Coordinates: 51°29′11″N 4°44′10″E
- Country: Netherlands
- Province: North Brabant
- Municipality: Breda
- Time zone: UTC+1 (CET)
  - Summer (DST): UTC+2 (CEST)

Meer
- Transport Zone
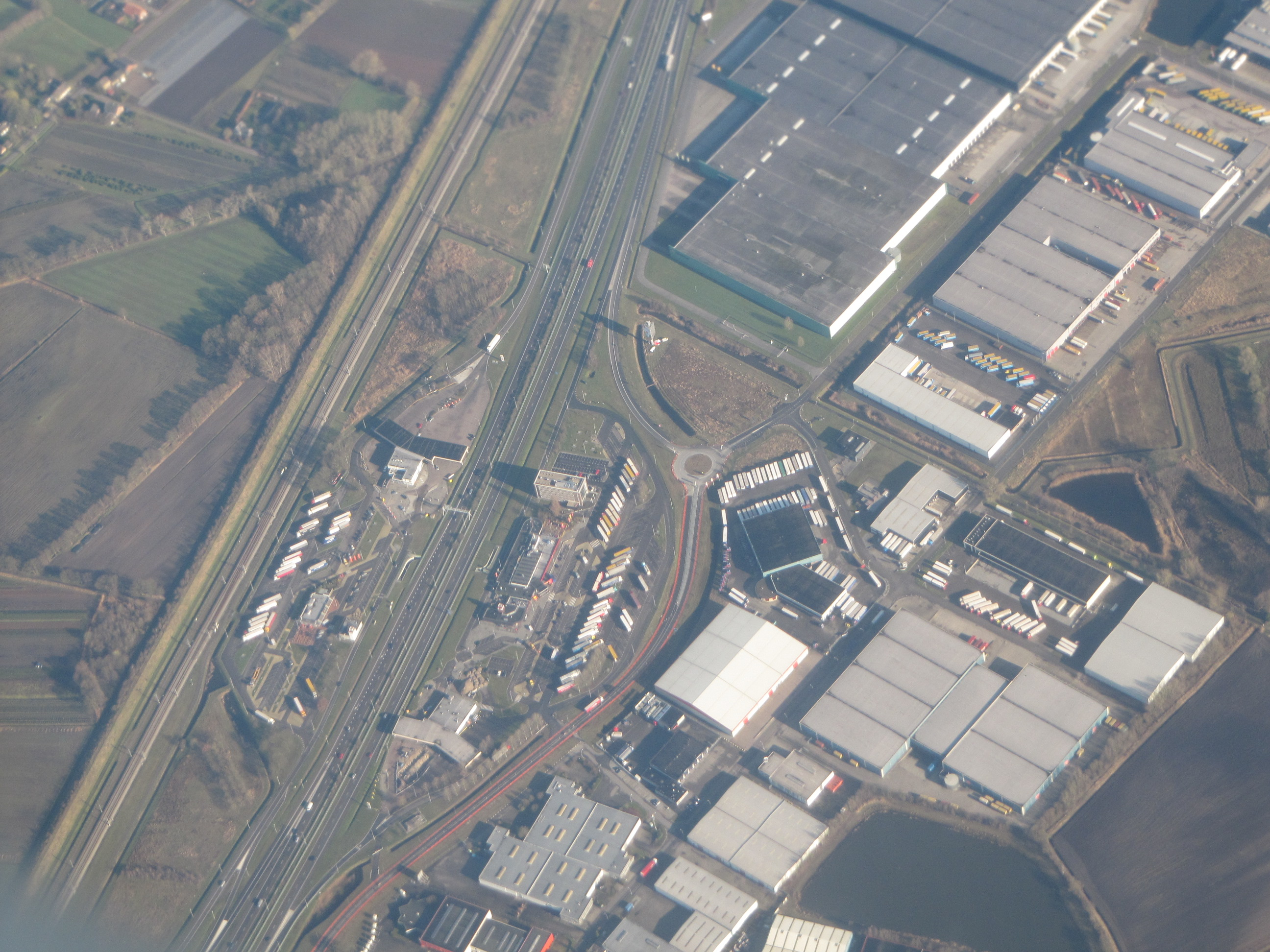
- Aerial photograph Hazeldonk/Meer

- Location in the province of Antwerp in Belgium Meer (Belgium)
- Coordinates: 51°29′07″N 4°44′02″E
- Country: Belgium
- Region: Flemish Community
- Province: Antwerp
- Municipality: Hoogstraten
- Time zone: UTC+1 (CET)
  - Summer (DST): UTC+2 (CEST)

Hazeldonk (as it is called in the Netherlands) or Meer (as it is called in Belgium) is the busiest border crossing between the Netherlands and Belgium. It sees an average of 55,000 vehicles per day, with some sources suggesting it as one of the busiest border crossings in Europe. The European route E19 (Amsterdam - Paris) crosses the border here and turns from the Dutch A16 (Rotterdam - Hazeldonk) into the Belgian A1/E19 (Meer - Brussels) motorway.

Since 1997 the former municipality Hazeldonk belongs to the municipality of Zundert. The border crossing and adjacent industrial area belongs to the municipality of Breda. At the Dutch side of the border lies the service station Hazeldonk, which includes fast food restaurants, petrol stations and a hotel.

The Schiphol–Antwerp high-speed railway also crosses the Dutch/Belgium border here and connects the HSL-Zuid with the HSL 4.

Due to the Schengen acquis there is free movement of persons and goods between the Netherlands and Belgium, although there are regular inspections by mutual customs. The Dutch and Belgian police forces also work closely together and can freely continue their work on both sides of the border, including in priority pursuit of a suspicious vehicle.

== History ==
The name Hazeldonk is mentioned for the first time in 1303, regarding the nearby Dutch civil parishe Hazeldonk. Meer refers to nearby the Belgian village Meer in the municipality of Hoogstraten. The business association at Hazeldonk is a collaboration with Hazeldonk and the Transport Zone Meer and is called "Logistics Center Hazeldonk Meer".

On the 17th of January 1972 the Dutch Queen Juliana and her Belgian colleague King Baudouin officially opened the road between Antwerp and Rotterdam (Then known as E10). On that day there was no border control office and freight traffic stil needed to use the old N263 via Wuustwezel and Zundert. Later in 1984 a customs post 'Breda' was realised.

On initiative of the Provincial states of Noord-Brabant a distribution center was built on Dutch grounds next to the customs office. On the opposed side in Belgium the 'Transport Zone Meer' arose. This was the start of the international transport hub as it is today.
