= Wijck =

Wijck is a Dutch surname derived from the Dutch word for neighborhood, "wijk".

Wijk in turn is derived from the Latin word "vicus". A vicus was a small settlement that started to emerge next to Roman forts, when local people wanted to trade with the Romans. Vicus became vic / wic / vyc / wyc / wik / wick / wich / wyk / wyck / wych, which became wijk or wijck. The sound of the "i" changed from sounding like "leek" or "weak", but somewhat shorter (vicus » vic), towards sounding like "strike" or "Mike" (wijck).

Notable people with the surname include:

- C.C. van Asch van Wijck (1900–1932), Dutch artist, model and sculptor
- Jaak van Wijck (1870–1946), notable Dutch painter
- Johan Cornelis van der Wijck (1848–1919), Dutch lieutenant general of the Royal Netherlands East Indies Army
- Robert Anderson Van Wyck (1849–1918), Mayor of New York
- Thomas Wijck (1616–1677), Dutch painter, a member of Dutch family of painters and draughtsmen
- Titus van Asch van Wijck (1849–1902), Dutch nobleman, politician and colonial governor of Suriname

== See also ==
- Van Asch Van Wijck Mountains, a mountain range in Suriname
- Tenggelamnya Kapal van der Wijck (Sinking of the van der Wijck), an Indonesian serial and later novel
- WJCK (disambiguation)
- Wijk (disambiguation)
- Van Wyck (disambiguation)
