= Van Wijk =

Van Wijk is a Dutch toponymic surname. "Wijk" may refer to Wijk bij Duurstede or a number of other towns, including Wijk near Leusden, Beverwijk, Rijswijk, Waalwijk, and Wijk aan Zee. 12,750 people in the Netherlands carried the name in 2007. Alternative forms are van Wijck, van der Wijk, van Wyk (the common Afrikaans form), and van Wyck (mostly in the United States). Notable people with the surname include:

Van Wijk

- Dennis van Wijk (born 1962), Dutch footballer and manager
- Jack van Wijk (born 1959), Dutch computer scientist
- Jan van Wijk (born 1962), Dutch racing cyclist
- Joop van Wijk (1950–2022), Dutch film director
- Kevin van Wijk (born 1989), Dutch basketball player
- L. M. van Wijk (born 1946), Dutch businessman
- Michael Van Wijk (born 1952), English bodybuilder, actor and television presenter
- Milou van Wijk (born 2004), Dutch swimmer
- Nicolaas van Wijk (1880–1941), Dutch linguist
- Remco van Wijk (born 1972), Dutch field hockey player
- Uco van Wijk (1924–1966), Dutch astronomer and educator

Van Wijck

- Frieda Van Wijck (born 1950), Flemish radio and television presenter
- Jaak van Wijck (1870–1946), Dutch painter

Van Asch van Wijck

- C. C. van Asch van Wijck (1900–1932), Dutch artist and sculptor
- Titus van Asch van Wijck (1849–1902), Dutch governor of Suriname, after whom the Van Asch Van Wijck Mountains were named

Van der Wijck

- Aart van der Wijck (1840–1914), Dutch Governor-General of the Dutch East Indies
- Johan Cornelis van der Wijck (1848–1919), Dutch military leader and governor of Aceh

== See also ==
- Van Wijk (crater), lunar impact crater named after Uco van Wijk
- Wijck
- Van Wyk
