= Wyk (disambiguation) =

Wyk is a village in Poland.

Wyk, or WYK or Van Wyk may also refer to:

- West Yorkshire, a county in England, Chapman code
- Wyk auf Föhr, a town on the German island of Föhr, Schleswig-Holstein
- Wah Yan College, Kowloon, a Catholic boys-only secondary school in Hong Kong
- van Wyk, a South African surname
- Van Wyk and Grumbach syndrome, in girls

== See also ==
- Wijk (disambiguation)
- Wyck
