= Goswin Haex van Loenhout =

Most Reverend Goswin Haex von Loenhout
- Auxiliary Bishop of Utrecht
- Church: Catholic Church
- Diocese: Diocese of Utrecht
- In office: 1469–1475

Orders
- Consecration: 29 Sep 1469 by Guillaume Fillastre

Personal details
- Died: 31 March 1475 Utrecht, Netherlands

Goswin Haex von Loenhout, O. Carm. or Goswinus Hexius (1398 – 31 Mar 1475) was a Roman Catholic prelate who served as Auxiliary Bishop of Utrecht (1469–1475).

== Biography ==
Goswin Haex was born Loenhout. It is likely that he is the same as "Goeswin van Nedervenne" (Nedervenne was a settlement in Loenhout), who in 1412 became a citizen of Bergen op Zoom. He was ordained a Carmelite priest in Vlissingen. On 15 May 1469, he was appointed during the papacy of Pope Paul II as Auxiliary Bishop of Utrecht and either Titular Bishop of Hierapolis in Phrygia or Hierapolis in Syria. On 29 Sep 1469, he was consecrated bishop by Guillaume Fillastre, Bishop of Tournai. He served as Auxiliary Bishop of Utrecht until his death on 31 Mar 1475.
