= Loenhout =

- Village
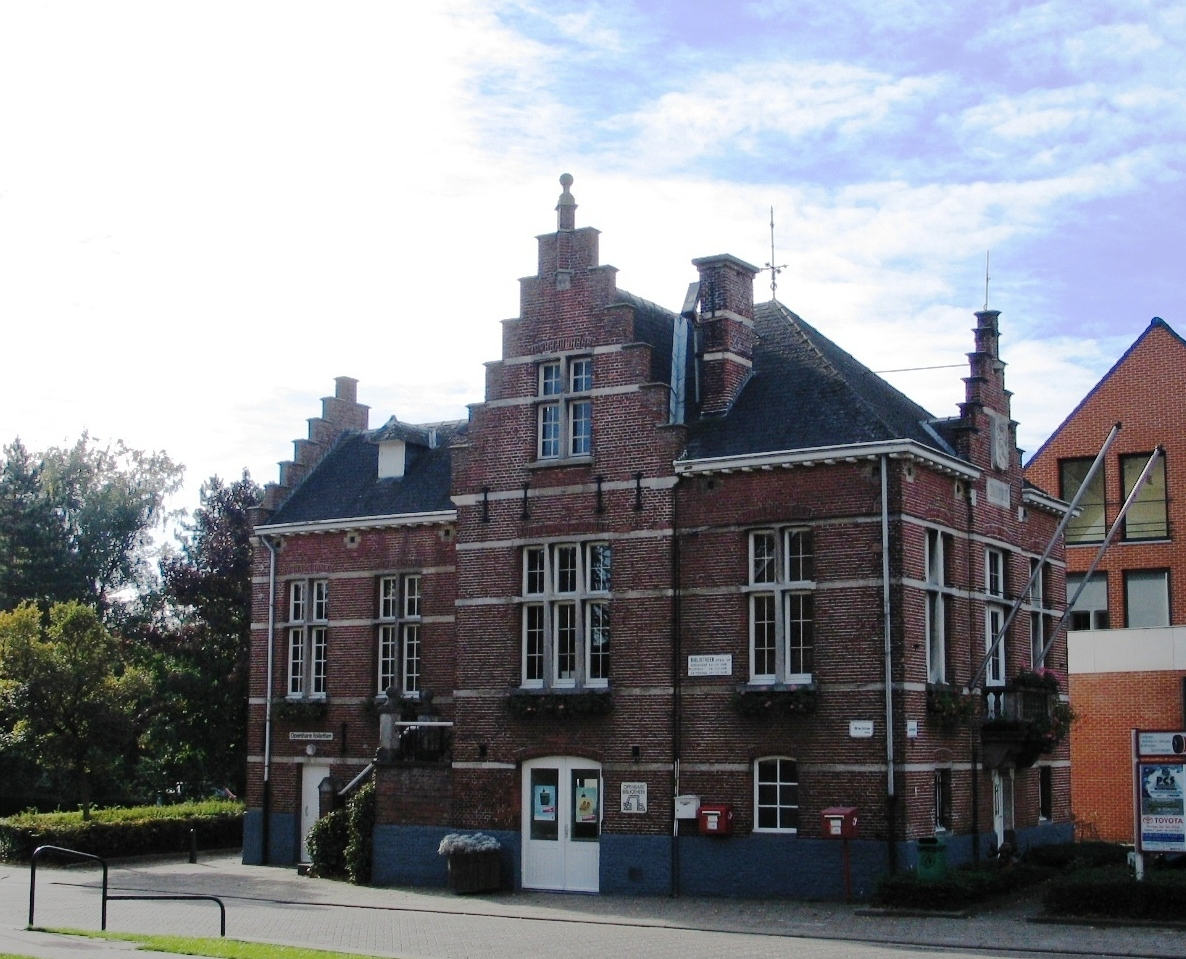
- Former town hall
- Coat of arms
- Location in Belgium
- Coordinates: 51.3992°N 4.6439°E
- Country: Belgium
- Region: Flemish Region
- Province: Antwerp
- Municipality: Wuustwezel

Area
  - Total: 31.07 km^{2} (12.00 sq mi)
- Highest elevation: 22 m (72 ft)
- Lowest elevation: 13 m (43 ft)

Population (2021)
  - Total: 4,411
  - Density: 142.0/km^{2} (367.7/sq mi)
- Time zone: CET
- Postal code: 2990

Loenhout is a village and deelgemeente (sub-municipality) of the municipality of Wuustwezel in the province of Antwerp, Belgium. The village is located near the Dutch border, and about 26 kilometres (16 mi) north-east of the city of Antwerp.

== History ==
The area around Loenhout used to contain two heerlijkheden under the same Lord, but one was a fief of Hoogstraten while the other belonged to the Duchy of Brabant. Loenhout became a parish in 13th century, and was awarded to the St. Bernard's Abbey of Hemiksen in 1277. The Dutch Revolt in the late 16th century resulted in the destruction of the castle and a near depopulation of the area. In the 18th century, during the rule of Maria Theresa of Naples and Sicily, the wilderness was cultivated, and Loenhout became an agricultural community specialising in livestock.

Loenhout was an independent municipality until 1977 when it was merged with Wuustwezel.

== Nature and landscape ==
Loenhout is located in the North Campine, a region with a poor sandy soil sparsely populated before the 20th century. It is a flat area with a height of 13-22 meters. A number of streams run north from the south, of which the Kleine Aa (Small Aa river) is the most important. These streams come together at the Belgian-Dutch border to form the Aa of Weerijs.

The A1 (E19) motorway and the high-speed train line (Thalys) Schiphol – Antwerp cut through the landscape southeast of Loenhout.

== Underground gas storage facility ==
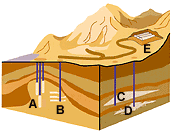
Natural gas can be stored in different underground geological structures covered by a low-permeable caprock: (A, B) dome structure, (C) aquifer reservoirs and (D) depleted reservoirs. The Loenhout gas storage structure looks more like an 'upside-down soup plate' structure (C) than like a well-shaped dome.

The Belgian Fluxys company operates an Underground Gas Storage (UGS) facility of 680 millions cubic meters of natural gas in Loenhout. The gas is stored in a fissured aquifer system in the top Dinantian karstic limestones (Visean age) of the Heibaart structure. The Lower Carboniferous carbonates in the Campine-Brabant Basin are highly fractured, a prerequisite condition to store gas or to recover deep geothermal energy. The Heibaart structure was investigated by means of several deep exploration boreholes, the first performed for Petrofina in 1962. Petrofina, the main petroleum company in Belgium at this time, was drilling in the North of Belgium in the hope of discovering a petroleum reservoir. The results of the exploration campaign were not successful, but it allowed to identify a promising trapping geological structure that could be used for gas storage. The gas storage project was developed two decades later.

The Loenhout UGS is one of the two gas storage systems connected to the Fluxys gas transport grid. The gas storage system consists of a geological dome structure (in fact looking more like an 'upside-down soup plate' than like a well-shaped dome) covered by a layer of low-permeable caprock. The impermeable caprock is water and gastight and allows to confine high-calorie gas in the underlying fissured limestone aquifer. From April to November, natural gas is injected under pressure in the system and draw down the water table. In the winter, when the gas consumption is high, gas is retrieved from the reservoir and the water table rises again. This unique infrastructure for Belgium was drilled at 1,000 – 1,500 m depth in the 1970's below the land of 5 municipalities (Loenhout, Wuustwezel, Hoogstraten, Rijkevorsel and Brecht) but is relatively poorly known by the public in Belgium.

With it 9 terrawatt hours (TWh), the gas storage site of Loenhout plays a strategical role in the safety of the gas supply of Belgium (4.74 % of the 190 TWh of natural gas annually consumed in Belgium in 2021), as emphasized by the Federal Belgian government in the frame of the energetic gas crisis in Europe resulting from the 2022 Russian invasion of Ukraine. The gas storage system plays a role of buffer to attenuate seasonal fluctuations in the gas market. While being filled in the summer, it contributes to nearly 15% of the winter gas peak consumption in Belgium.

In 2007, a second potential site for underground gas storage in the Campine-Brabant Basin was investigated by VITO, the Flemisch Institute for Technological Research, in Poederlee (municipality of Lille, Belgium). Its estimated total gas storage capacity was lower (300 millions cubic meters) than that of Loenhout (680 millions cubic meters), but the project was abandoned by Fluxys and Gasprom in 2008. There was two reasons for that: (1) the seismic survey showed that only 120 millions cubic meters of gas could be stored in the reservoir structure, and (2) GREG, the regulatory body of energy in Belgium, gave a negative advice to the government. GREG disagreed with the project because it was a joint venture between Fluxys and the Russian giant gas company Gasprom and that according to the contract of the joint company NV Poederlee Gas Storage, Gasprom would have had the monopoly to operate the site during 25 years and without any regulation.

== Events ==
The largest bloemencorso (flower parade) of Belgium is held in Loenhout. All the villages and hamlets in the area compete who has the most beautiful floats made out of flowers. The event is held on the second Sunday of September.

The Azencross is an annual cyclo-cross race held at the end of December in Loenhout.

== Notable people ==
- Goswin Haex van Loenhout (1398–1475), Roman Catholic prelate who served as Auxiliary Bishop of Utrecht
- Johannes Stadius (1527–1579), astronomer, astrologer, and mathematician
- Marten Van Riel (born 1992), triathlete

== Gallery ==
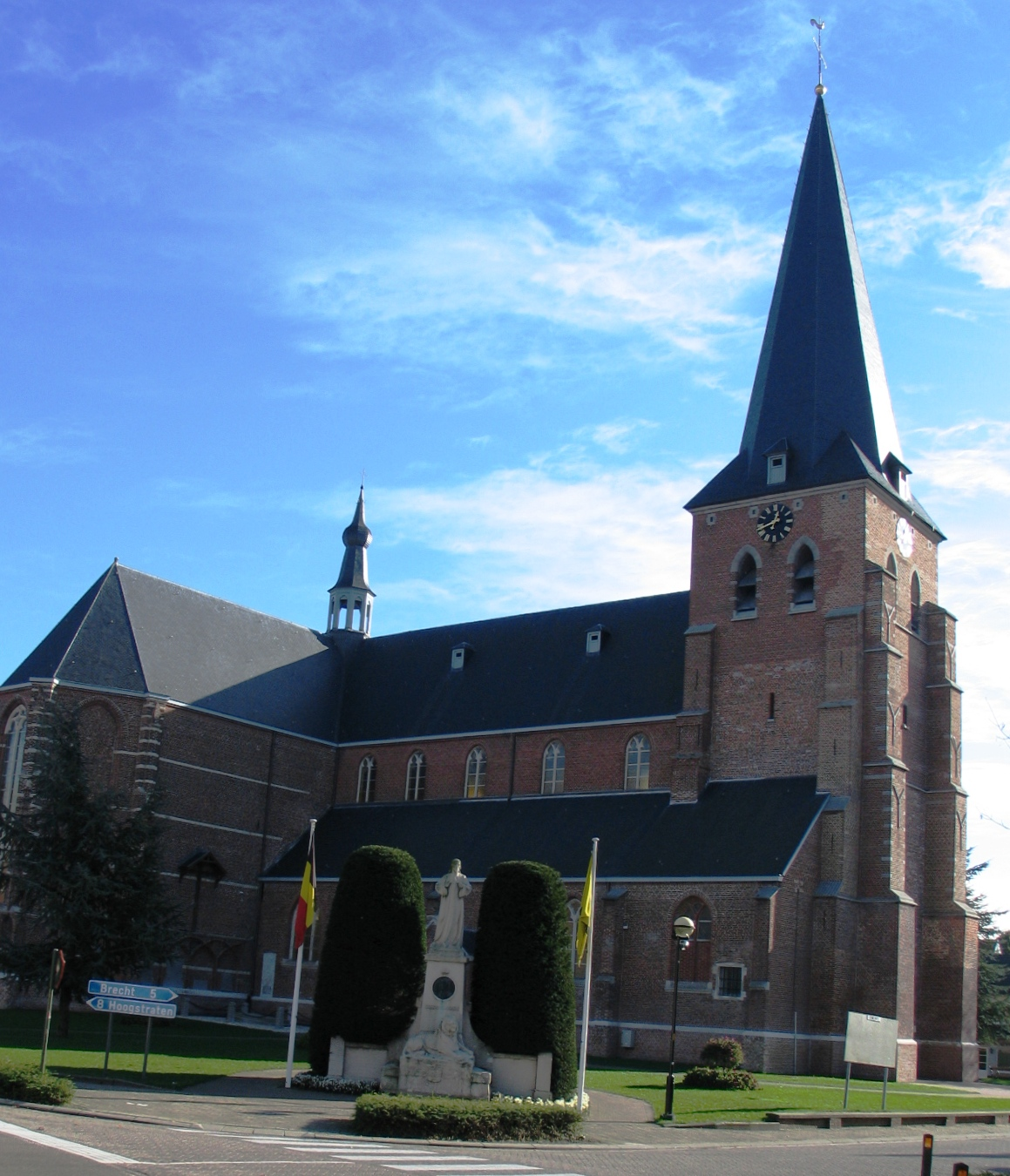
St Peter and Paul church

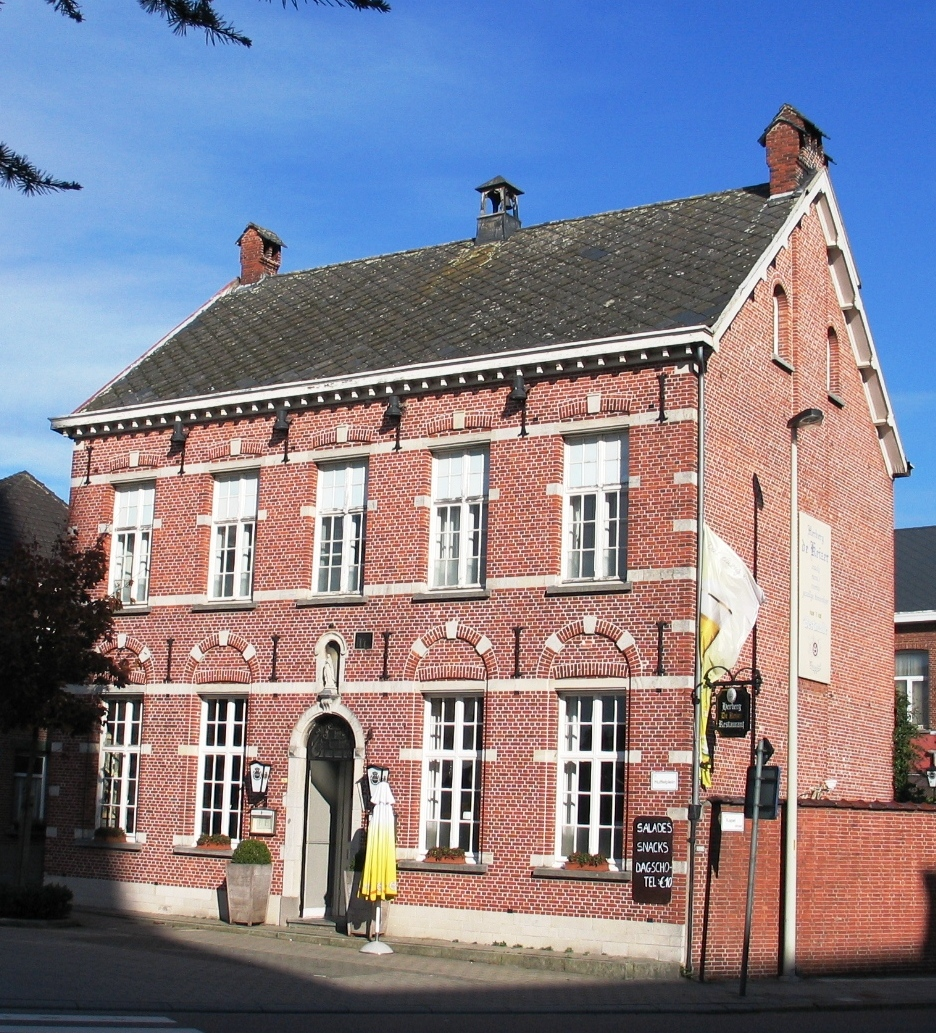
Inn De Keizer

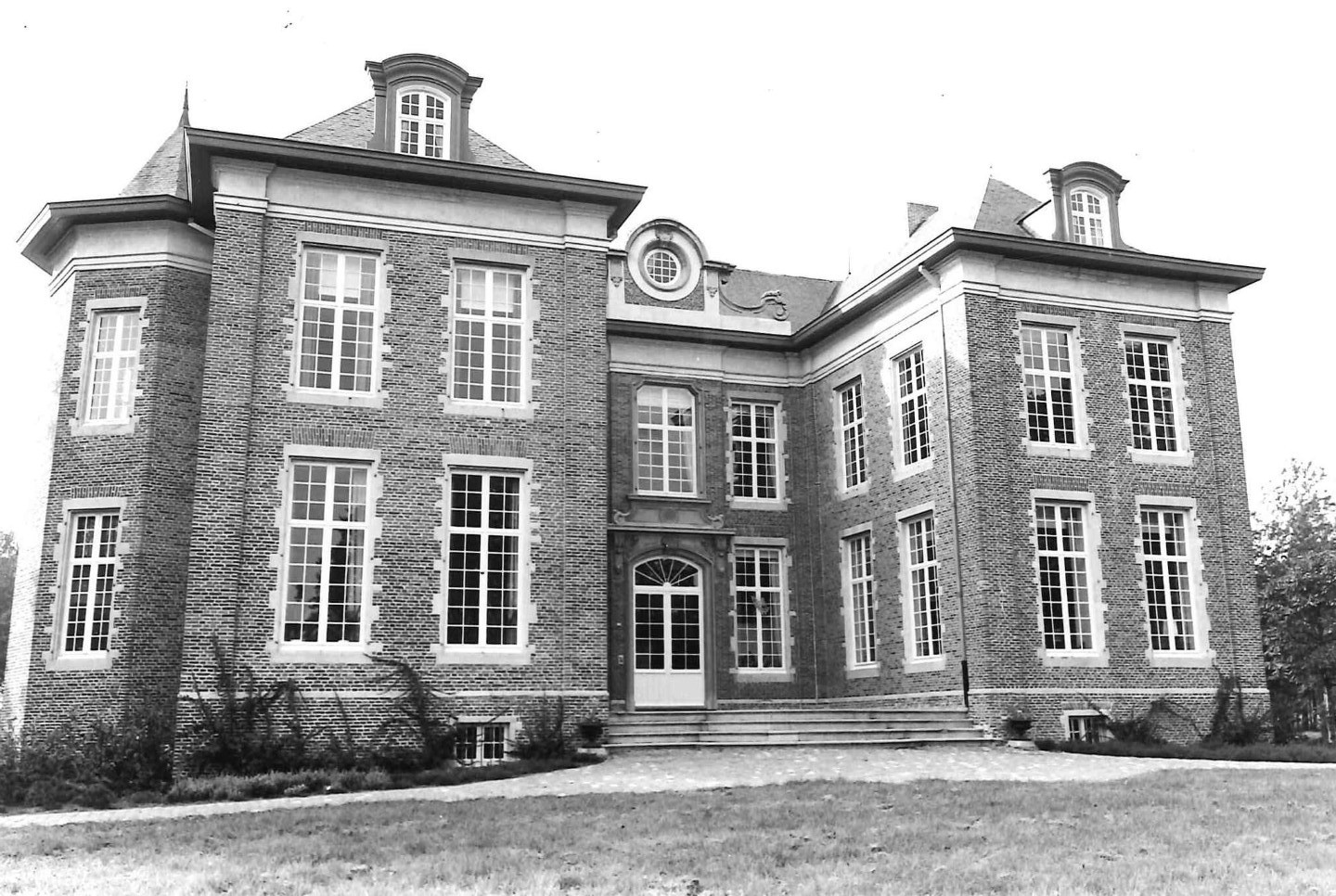
Castle Loenhorst
