= Wijk =

Wijk can refer to:

- Wijk aan Zee, part of the municipality Beverwijk, in North Holland, the Netherlands
- Wijk bij Duurstede, in Utrecht, the Netherlands
- Wijk en Aalburg, the main town in the municipality of Aalburg, North Brabant, the Netherlands
- Wijk (surname), a Swedish surname

== See also ==
- Van Wijk (and variants), a Dutch toponymic surname
- Marvin Wijks (1984–2025), a Dutch footballer
- Wyk (disambiguation)
