= Wik =

Wik may refer to:

- Wik peoples, several Australian Aboriginal groups from an extensive zone in Cape York
  - Wik languages
  - Wik Peoples v Queensland (1996), a landmark ruling that native title can coexist with pastoral leases in Australia
- Vik, Iran, a village in Zanjan Province, Iran, also known as Wik
- Wik (film), a 2016 Peruvian thriller drama film

== See also ==
- Wick (disambiguation)
- Wiki
- Wikipedia
- Wyck (disambiguation)
- W1K (disambiguation)
