= Mark (Dintel) =

Coordinates: 51.6587°N 4.3689°E

Mark river De Mark river
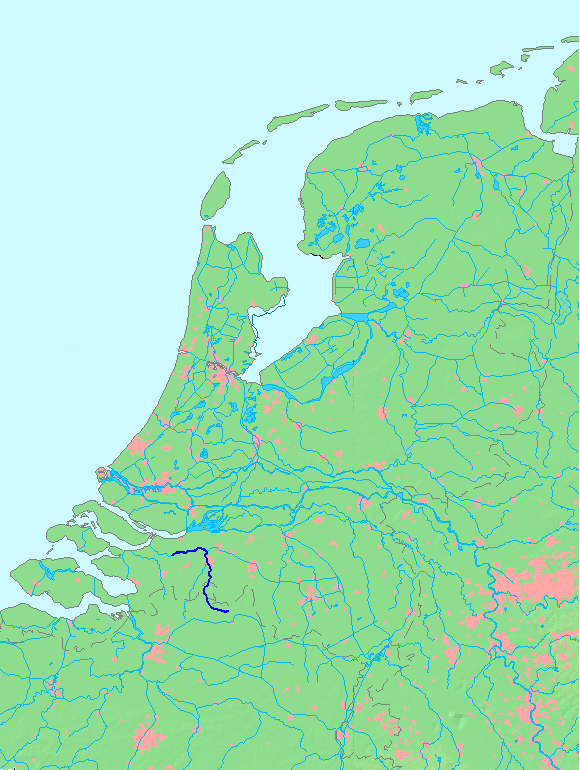
- Location of the Mark river

Location
- Country: Netherlands

Physical characteristics
- Mouth
  - location: Dintel
- Length: 80.6 km (50.1 mi)

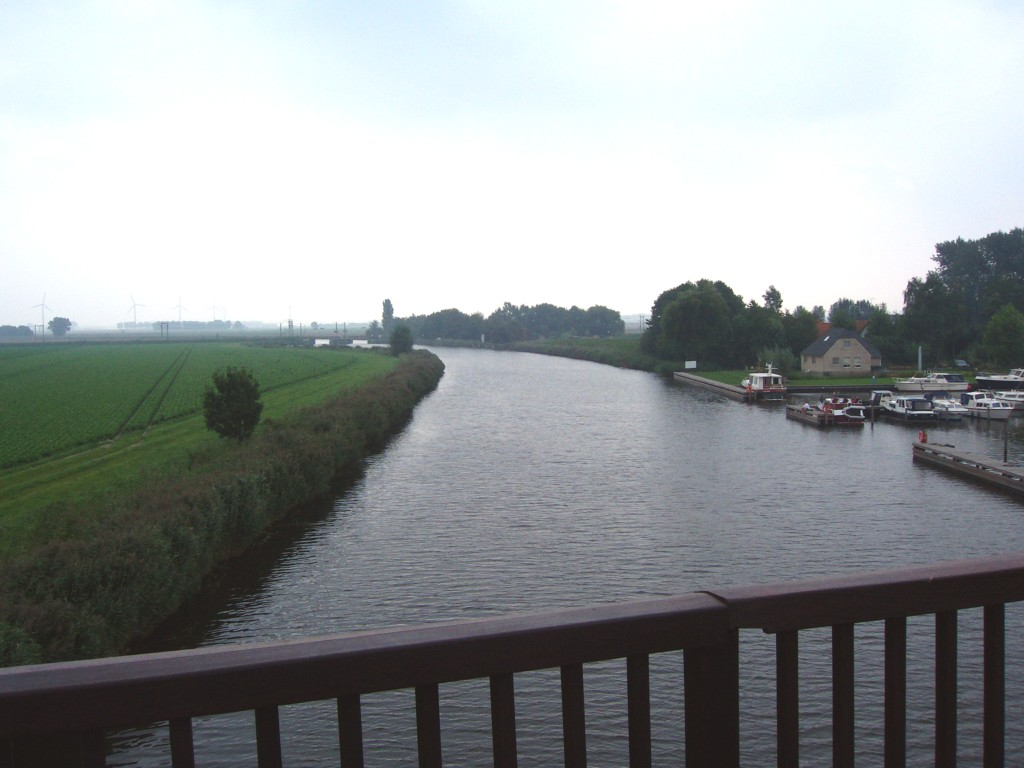
The Mark near Zevenbergen

The Mark (Dutch pronunciation: [ˈmɑr(ə)k]) is a river in the Dintel basin in Belgium and the Netherlands.

== Characteristics ==
The Mark rises north of Turnhout, Belgium, in the municipality of Merksplas. It passes through Hoogstraten before crossing the border with the Netherlands. In the city centre of Breda it receives its main tributary the Aa of Weerijs, forming the former defensive moat surrounding the city. North of the center of Breda, the water leaves the city and continues in a northerly direction, passing the Haagse Beemden as the river Mark. From this point the stream has become a river and commercial shipping is possible. At the village of Terheijden, the Mark makes a sharp turn to the west. Here is the connection with the Mark Canal. Near Oudenbosch/Standdaarbuiten, the Mark is known under the name Dintel. The Dintel flows into the Volkerak (part of the Rhine–Meuse–Scheldt delta) at Dintelsas. The Dintel and Mark are navigable for cargo ships up to 86 metres (282 ft) long from Dintelsas to Breda.

== Tributaries ==
- Kleine Mark (English: Little Mark)
- Merkske
- Heerlese Loop
- Strijbeekse beek
- Chaamse Beek
- Molenlei
- Aa of Weerijs
- Watermolenbeek

== See also ==
- Jaak van Wijck, painter of the river
