= Wijk (surname) =

Wijk is a Swedish surname. Notable people with the surname include:

- Andreas Wijk (born 1993), Swedish singer and model
- Anna Wijk (born 1991), Swedish former floorball player
- Carl Wijk (1906–1972), Swedish football player and coach
- Erik Wijk (born 1963), Swedish journalist and writer

== See also ==
- Van Wijk (and variants), a Dutch toponymic surname with a list of people bearing that name
