= McKeldin Mall =

Coordinates: 38.986°N 76.942°W

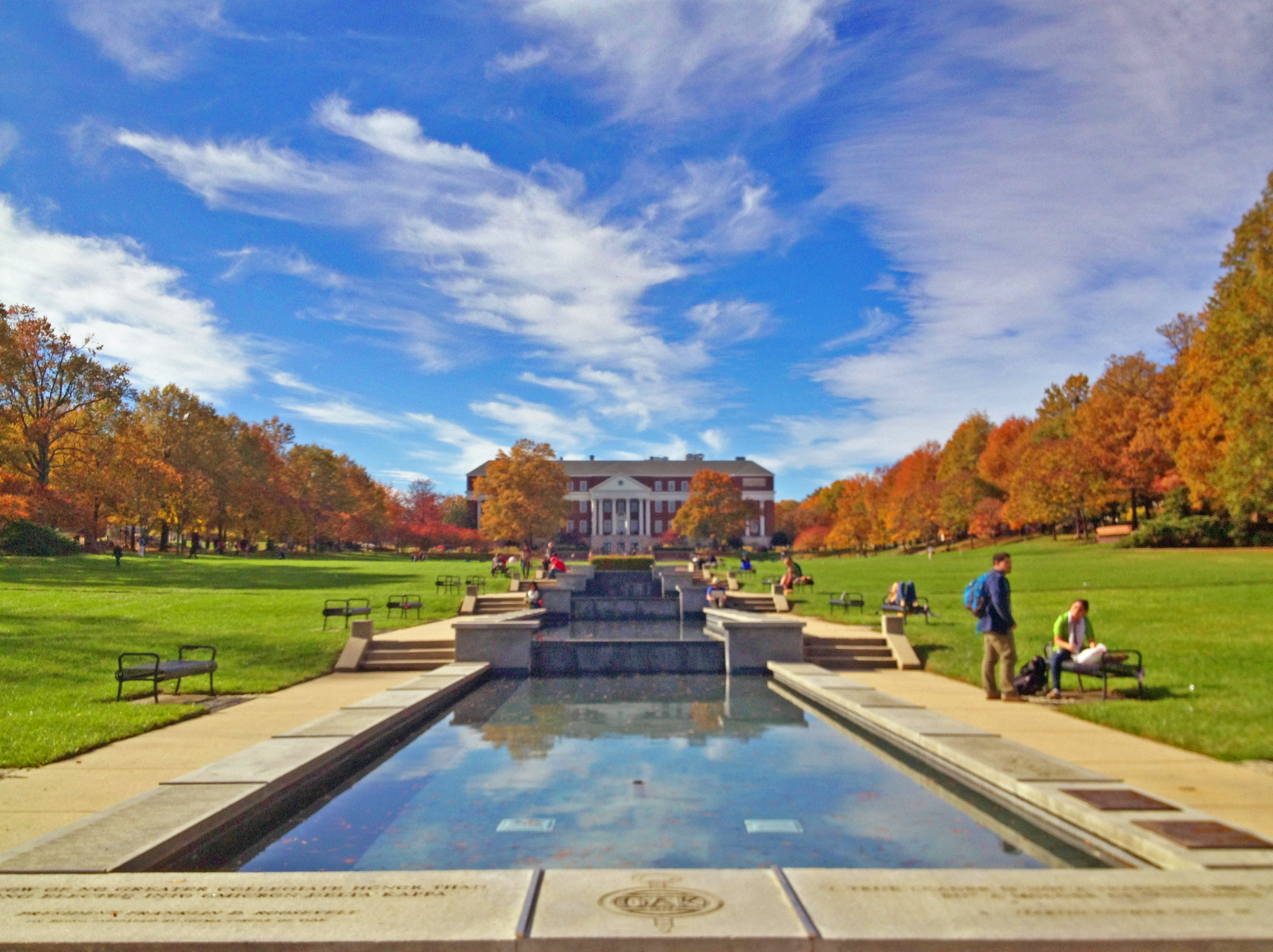
McKeldin Mall at University of Maryland, College Park, November 2013

McKeldin Mall is a nine-acre quad in the heart of the campus of the University of Maryland, College Park, United States. Named after Theodore McKeldin, the former Governor of Maryland, McKeldin Mall was considered to be the largest academic mall in the United States on its opening. It has been named one of the most picturesque college campus quads in the nation.

== Description ==
McKeldin Mall is book-ended (east to west) by the Main Administration building and McKeldin Library (the main library on campus) and along the north and south borders by various academic buildings, which are the homes to many departments in the College of Behavioral and Social Sciences, College of Arts and Humanities, and the College of Agriculture and Natural Resources. A 16-foot-by-250-foot rectangular fountain features prominently on the eastern half of the mall, honoring the university's members of the Omicron Delta Kappa society. A sundial, honoring Dutch astronomer Uco van Wijk (who founded the university's astronomy program) sits in the center of the mall, at the edge of the ODK fountain. Looking across the mall from the front entrance of McKeldin Library towards the Administration Building sits Testudo, the mascot of the University of Maryland.

The mall underwent a substantial renovation in 1990.

== Academic buildings ==
Northern end (from east to west):

- Symons Hall
- Edward St. John Teaching and Learning Center
- H.J. Patterson Hall
- Jimenez Hall

Southern end (from east to west):

- Marie Mount Hall
- Woods Hall
- Francis Scott Key Hall
- Tydings Hall
- Journalism Building (Note: Former home of the Philip Merrill College of Journalism. The Merrill College has since moved to the newly constructed Knight Hall and the Department of Government and Politics will be moving offices into the to-be-renamed Journalism Building after renovations.)

== The Peace Garden ==
Sitting in between the Main Administration Building and the ODK Fountain on McKeldin Mall is the Peace Garden. The Garden was created to commemorate the victims of the September 11 terrorist attacks. Flowers had been placed along the ODK Fountain on September 12, 2001 as a memorial; the Garden marks the location where those flowers were later buried. A plaque on the site explains the history of the Garden and includes the phrase, "May Peace Prevail on Earth."

== Images ==
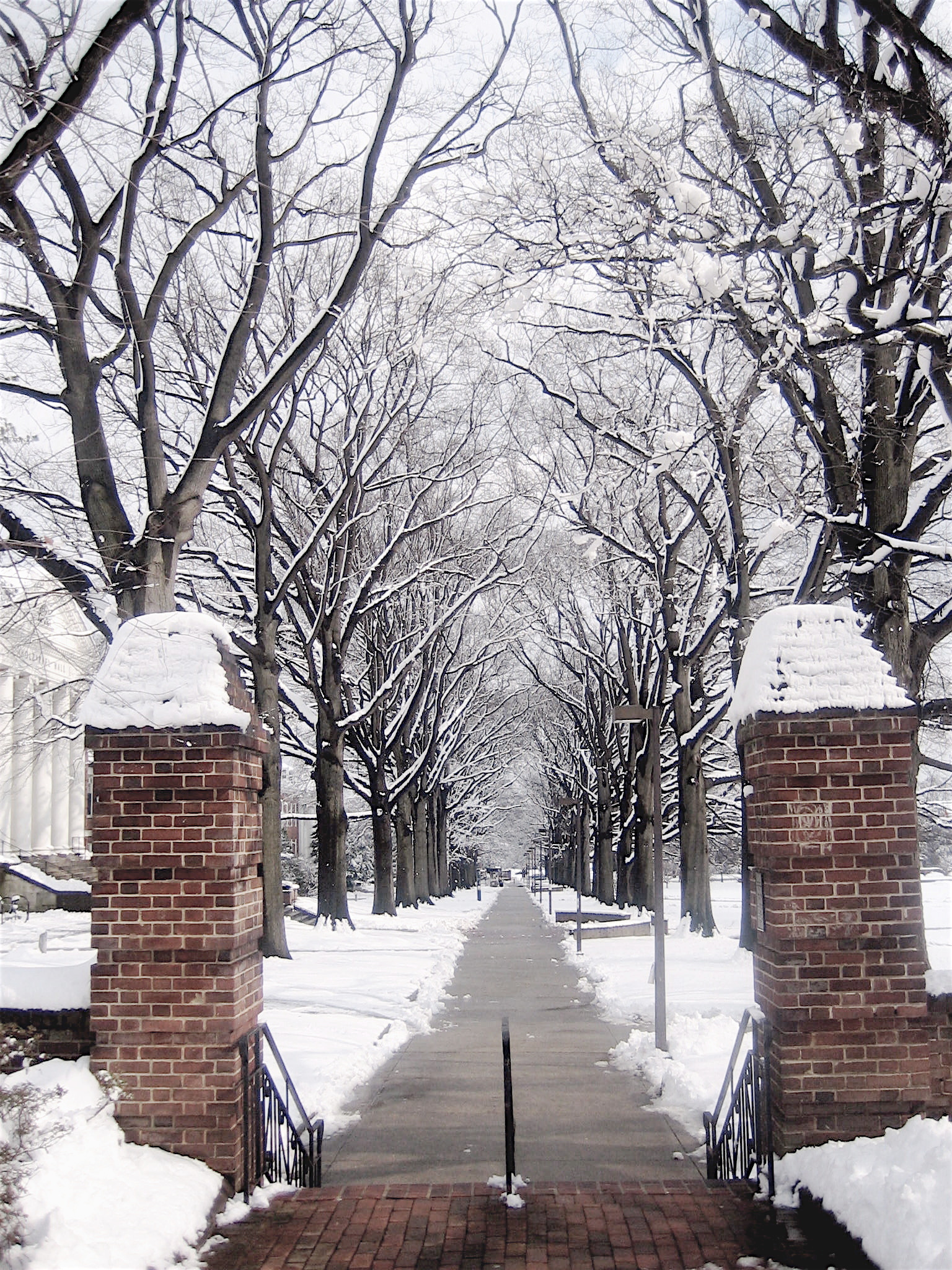
A walkway along the mall in winter.

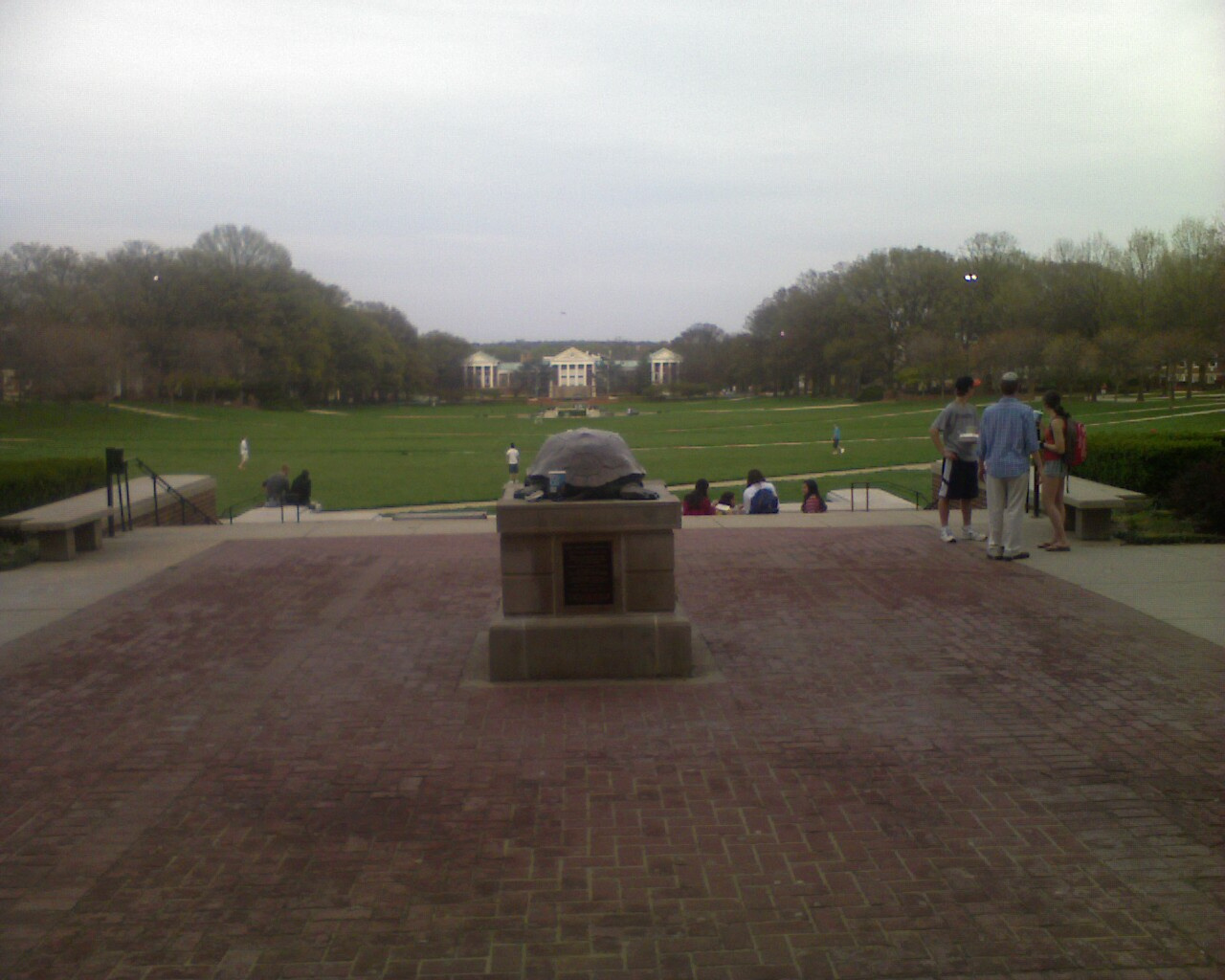
A view from the front entrance of the library.

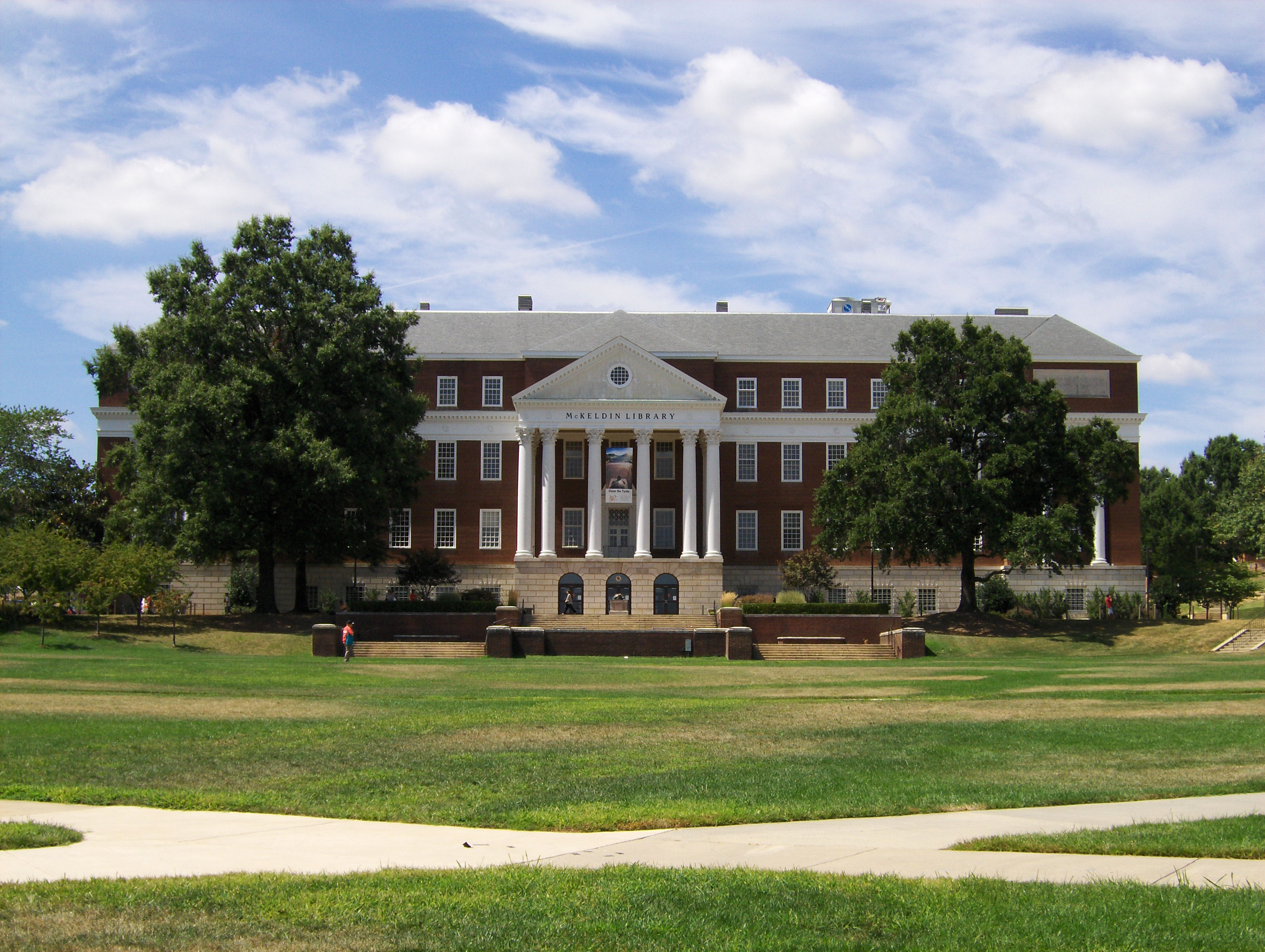
A view of McKeldin Library.

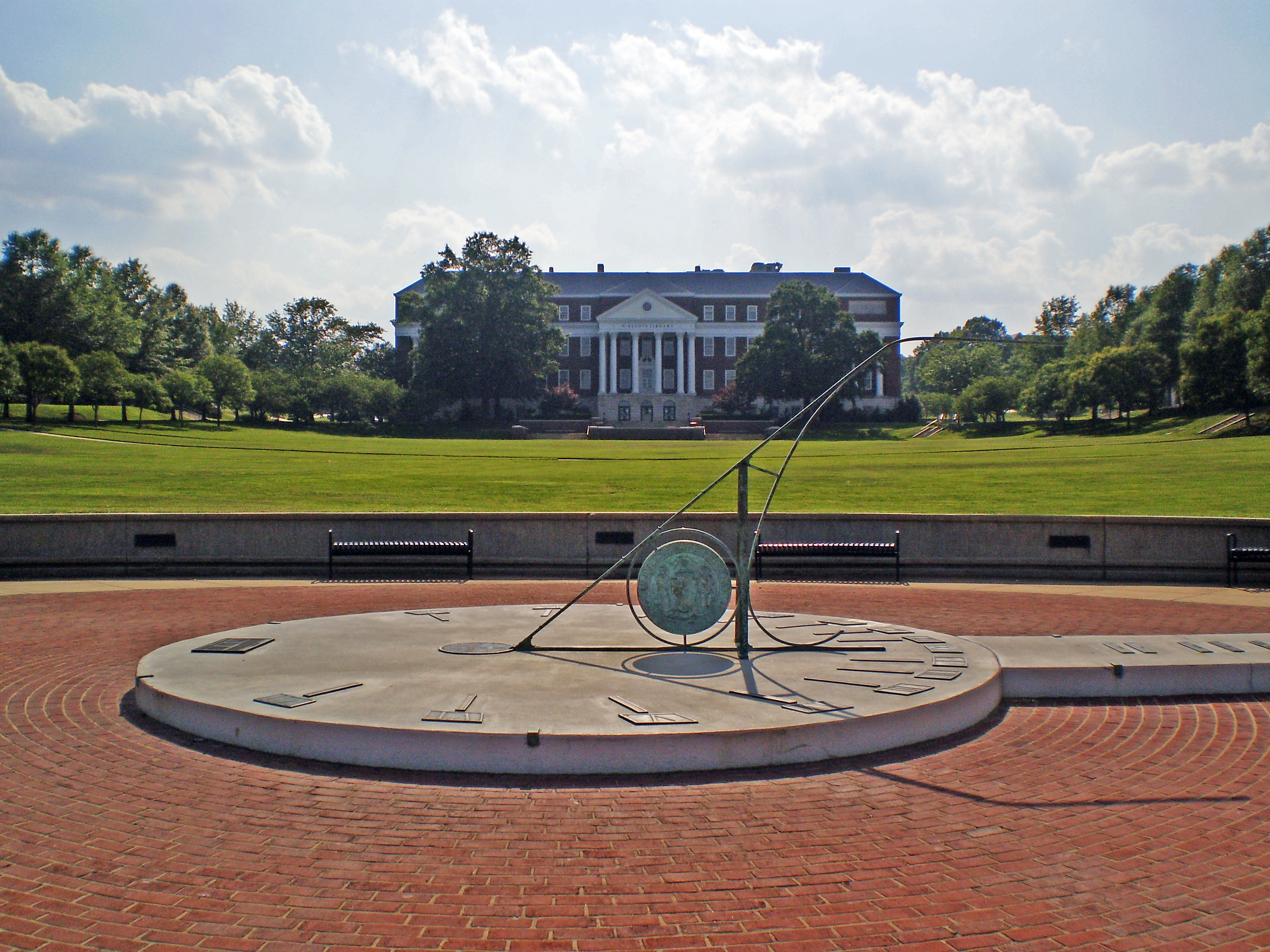
The sundial, in front of McKeldin Library.

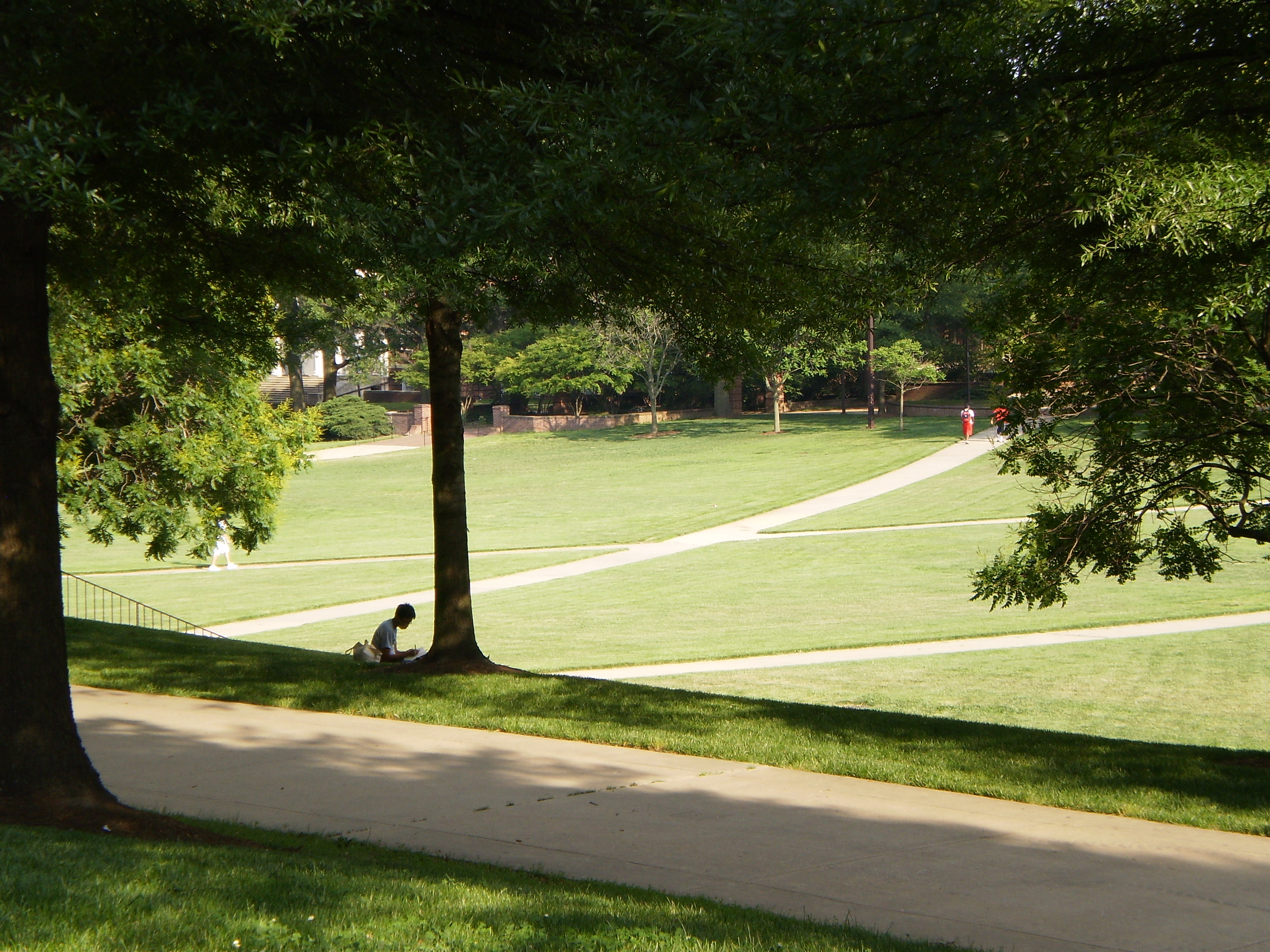
A student works on the mall.

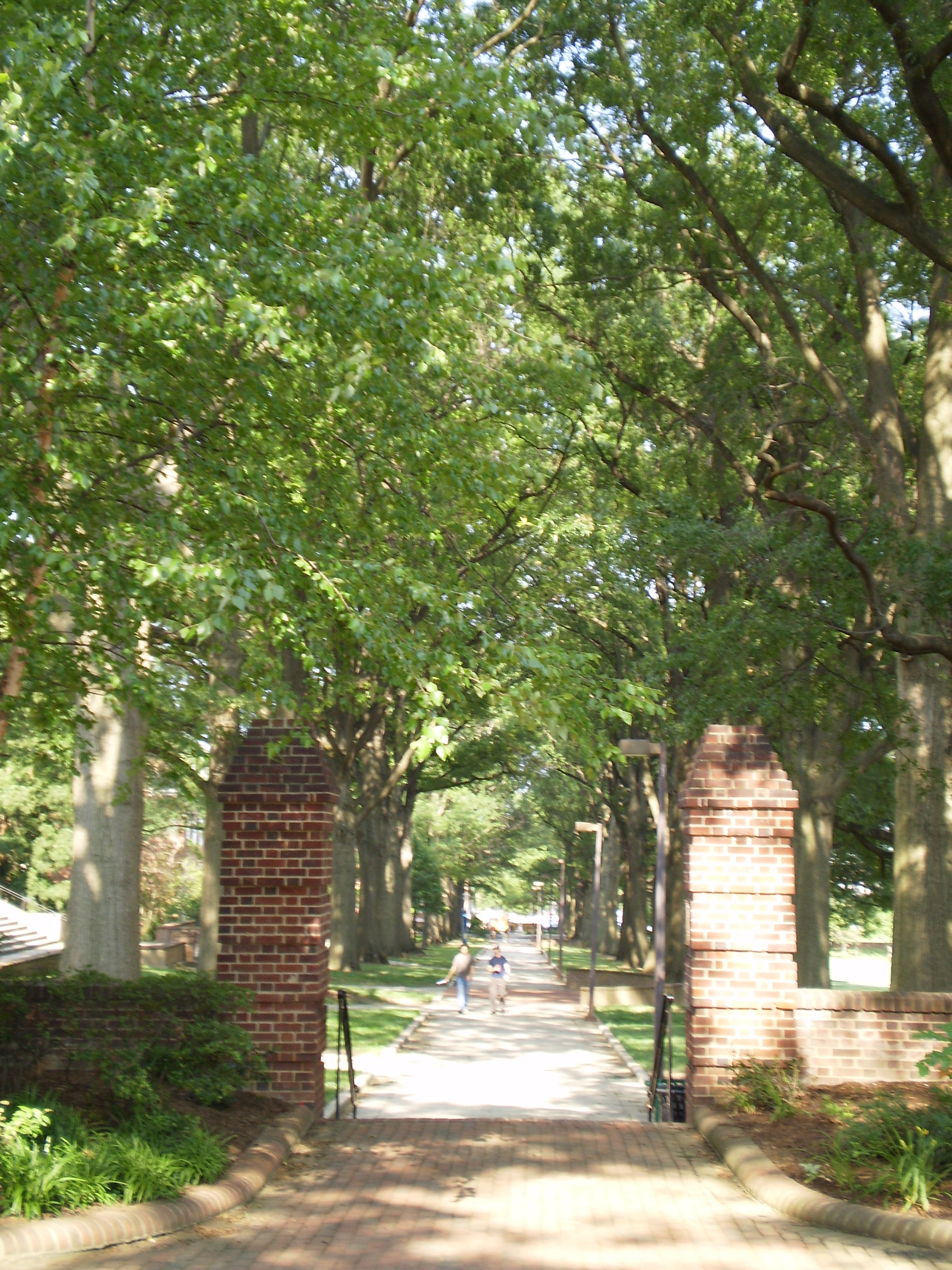
A walkway along the mall in summer.
