= W1K (disambiguation) =

W1K is one of the districts in the W postcode area.

W1K may also refer to:

- Worth1000, a defunct image manipulation website
- W1K, a codename for D-Wave 2X; a computer system by D-Wave Systems
- W1K, a world manufacturer identifier assigned to Mercedes-Benz cars; see Vehicle identification number

== See also ==
- Wik (disambiguation)
