= Van Wyck =

Van Wyck (pronounced Van Wike or Van Wick) is an Americanized variant of the Dutch name Van Wijk. It can refer to:

== Buildings ==
- Van Wyck Homestead Museum, in the Town of Fishkill, New York
- Van Wyck Junior High School, an intermediate school in Hopewell Junction, New York
- Van Wyck Hospital, in Queens, New York

== Places ==
- Van Wyck, South Carolina
- Van Wyck, Washington
- Van Wyck Mountain, in the Catskill Mountains of New York

== Transportation ==
- Van Wyck Avenue (LIRR station), an alternate name for the Dunton Long Island Rail Road station in Queens, New York
- Van Wyck Boulevard (IND Queens Boulevard Line), former alternate name for the Briarwood (IND Queens Boulevard Line) subway station in New York City
- Van Wyck Expressway, also known as Interstate 678, an interstate highway spur route in New York City
- Jamaica–Van Wyck station, New York City subway

== People with the surname ==
- Van Wyck Brooks (1886–1963), American writer and historian
- F. Van Wyck Mason (1901–1978), American historian and novelist
- Anthony Van Wyck (1822–1900), Wisconsin politician
- Augustus Van Wyck (1850–1922), New York lawyer and politician
- Charles Van Wyck (1824–1895), United States Senator from Nebraska
- Pierre C. Van Wyck (1778–1827), NY District Attorney
- Robert Anderson Van Wyck (1849–1918), the first mayor of New York City after consolidation in 1898
- Warren Van Wyck (born 1952), American politician
- Wilfrid Van Wyck (1904–1983), British businessman
- William W. Van Wyck (1777–1840), American politician
