= Aa of Weerijs =

River in Netherlands and Belgium

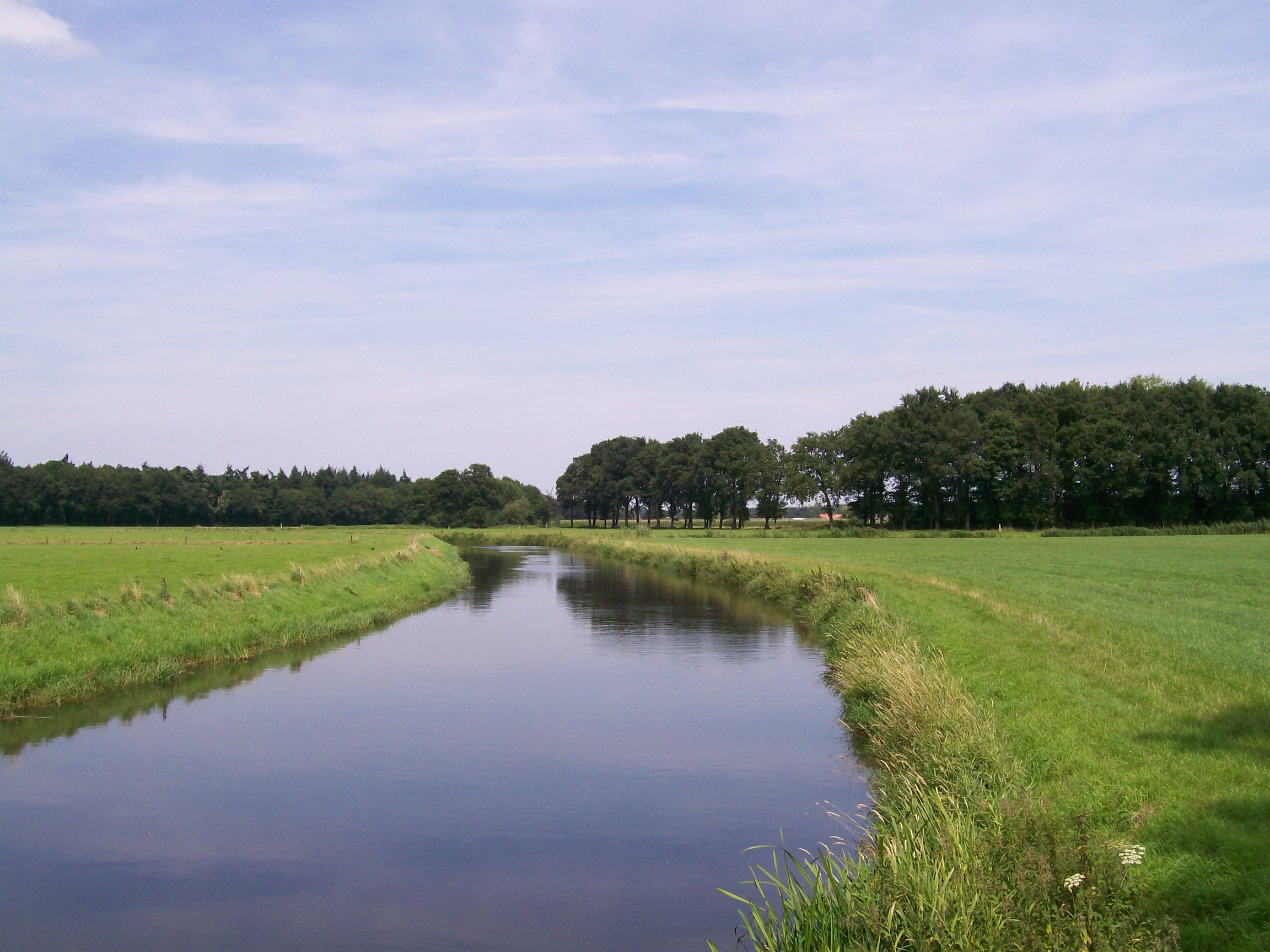
- The Aa of Weerijs

- Location of mouth

Location
- Country: Belgium

Physical characteristics
- Mouth
  - coordinates: 51.5926°N 4.7714°E

The Aa of Weerijs (Dutch pronunciation: [ˌaː ʔɔf ˈʋeːrɛis], lit. 'Aa or Weerijs') is a river in Belgium and Netherlands, where it arises from the confluence of the Great Aa (in Wuustwezel) and the Small Aa (in Brecht). In Breda (which means the broad Aa) it is the river in the canals of this city. The name Broad Aa is a reference to its confluence with the Upper Mark. The conjoined rivers continue flowing as the Mark. The width of the Aa of Weerijs varies from 5 meters near the border with Belgium up to 15 meters in Breda. The valley is about 3 kilometers wide.
