= Gart Westerhout =

Dutch-American astronomer (1927–2012)

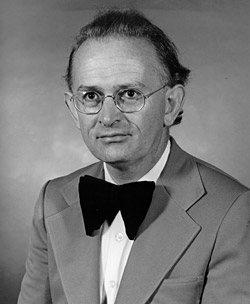
- Born: Gart Westerhout; June 15, 1927; The Hague, Netherlands
- Died: October 14, 2012 (aged 85)
- Education: University of Leiden
- Known for: Westerhout Catalog
- Scientific career
- Fields: astronomy
- Workplaces: University of Leiden, University of Maryland, College Park, U.S. Naval Observatory

Gart Westerhout (15 June 1927 – 14 October 2012) was a Dutch-American astronomer. Well before completing his university studies at Leiden, he had already become well-established internationally as a radio astronomer in the Netherlands, specializing in studies of radio sources and the Milky Way Galaxy based on observations of radio continuum emissions and 21-cm spectral line radiation that originates in interstellar hydrogen. He emigrated to the United States, became a naturalized citizen, and held a number of important scientific and management positions in academic and government institutions.

== Career ==
Westerhout was born in The Hague, and studied at the University of Leiden (Sterrewacht te Leiden) with Hendrik van de Hulst and Jan Hendrik Oort. Contemporaries and colleagues in the Netherlands included Hugo van Woerden, C. Lex Muller, Maarten Schmidt, Kwee Kiem King, Lodewijk Woltjer, and Charles L. Seeger, III. While they were students, Wim Brouw, Mike Davis, Ernst Raimond, Whitney Shane and Jaap Tinbergen worked with him.

He was awarded Physics and Astronomy degrees: Cand. (1950) and Drs. (1954) and was awarded a Ph.D. in Astronomy and Physics in 1958. Notable scientific achievements included: the significant Westerhout Catalog of continuum emission radio sources, by which "W" numerical designations such sources are still referenced (see for example Westerhout 49), done with the then-new Dwingeloo telescope; and his survey of neutral hydrogen in the outer parts of our Galaxy. His pioneering work, with colleagues, showed the first hints of spiral structure in the interstellar gas, revealed differential rotation in our Galaxy, and established a revised Galactic coordinate system still in use today.

While still at Leiden University, he held the posts of Assistant (1952–56), Scientific Officer (1956–59, and Chief Scientific Officer (1959–62). Arriving in 1962 as the first Director of a fledgling Astronomy Program at the University of Maryland (started by Uco van Wijk), he grew it into a major department granting masters and doctorate degrees. On the research side the Line Survey, Maryland-Green Bank Galactic 21-cm undertaken with the 91-m radio telescope of the National Radio Astronomy Observatory, not only extended to higher angular resolution our knowledge of Galactic structure, but also accomplished the training of graduate students who went on to notable achievements of their own.

He continued at Maryland in that role through 1973, with additional responsibilities from 1972-73 as Chairman of the Division of Mathematical & Physical Sciences and Engineering. From 1973 to '77 he was Professor of Astronomy at the University of Maryland, temporarily becoming Visiting Astronomer at the Max-Planck-Institut für Radioastronomie (MPIfR) in Bonn, Germany 1973-74.

From 1977-1993 he was Scientific Director at the U.S. Naval Observatory in Washington, DC. While there, he guided the evolution of that observatory toward astronomical data obtained from telescopes at the Flagstaff station, astrometric data produced by the techniques of radio interferometry and by innovative application of optical interferometry techniques (ground- and space-based.)

Together with his wife Judith, he had 5 children – Magda Cathleen, Gart, Brigit, Julian, and Anthony.

When Edward L. G. Bowell discovered asteroid 5105 Westerhout, he named it in Westerhout's honor.

== Memberships ==
Memberships include International Astronomical Union (IAU) (Commissions 33, 34, 40, 24 & 5), International Scientific Radio Union (URSI), American Astronomical Society (AAS), Royal Astronomical Society, and Sigma Xi.

He contributed his scientific and management expertise widely, for example to IAU, National Science Foundation (NSF), AAS, National Research Council, Associated Universities Inc., Inter-Union Committee for the Allocation of Frequencies (IUCAF), URSI, National Radio Astronomy Observatory, MPIfR, MIT's Haystack Observatory, Arecibo Observatory, National Academy of Sciences.

== Awards ==
Awards and special recognition have included a NATO Fellowship, CSIRO (Australia) Fellowship, Award for the Teaching of Science, Washington Academy of Sciences, Humboldt Prize, Listings in : Outstanding Educators of America, American Men and Women in Science, Who's Who in America.

== Bibliography ==
=== Papers published in refereed journals ===
Astronomy research

- "A Comparison of the Intensity Distribution of Radio-Frequency Radiation with a Model of the Galactic System," (with J. H. Oort), Bull. Astron. Inst. Neth., 11, 323, 1951.
- "The Rotation of the Inner Parts of the Galactic System," (with K. K. Kwee and C. A. Muller), Bull. Astron. Inst. Neth., 12, 211, 1954.
- "Search for Polarization of the Crab Nebula and Cassiopeia A at 22 cm Wavelength," Bull. Astron. Inst. Neth., 12, 309,1956.
- "The Flux Densities of some Radio Sources at 400 Mc/s," (with C. L. Seeger and H. C. van de Hulst), Bull. Astron. Inst. Neth., 13, 89, 1956.
- "Continuous Radiation from the Direction of the Galactic Centre at 22 cm," Bull. Astron. Inst. Neth., 13, 105, 1956.
- "A Catalogue of 21-cm Line Profiles," (with C. A. Muller), Bull. Astron. Inst. Neth., 13, 151, 1957.
- "The Distribution of Atomic Hydrogen in the Outer Parts of the Galactic System," Bull. Astron. Inst. Neth., 13, 201, 1957.
- "Observations of Occulations of the Crab Nebula by the Moon at 400 Mc/s," (with C. L. Seeger), Bull Astron. Inst. Neth., 13, 312, 1957.
- "Intensites Relatives des Quatre Principales Radiosources Observees sur la Longueur d'Onde 22 cm; Note sur la Radiosource Saggittarius A", Compt. Rend. Acad. Sci. Paris, 245, 35, 1957.
- "Observations of Discrete Sources, the Coma Cluster, the Moon, and the Andromeda Nebula at a Wavelength of 75 cm.," (with C. L. Seeger and R. G. Conway), Astrophys. J., 126, 585, 1957.
- "A Survey of the Continuous Radiation from the Galactic System at a Frequency of 1390 Mc/s," Bull. Astron. Inst. Neth., 14, 215, 1958.
- "Note on the Density of Ionized Hydrogen in the Galactic System," Bull. Astron. Inst. Neth., 14, 261, 1958.
- "The Galactic System as a Spiral Nebula," (with J. H. Oort and F. J. Kerr), Monthly Notices Roy. Astron. Soc., 118, 379, 1958.
- "The New I.A.U. System of Galactic Coordinates," (with A. Blaauw, C. S. Gum and J. L. Pawsey), Monthly Notices Roy. Astron. Soc., 121, 123, 1960.
- "A 21-cm Determination of the Principal Plane of the Galaxy," (with C. S. Gum and F. J. Kerr), Monthly Notices Roy. Astron. Soc., 121, 132, 1960.
- "Die Durchmusterung Der Milchstrasse Und Die Quellendurchmusterung Bei 2.7 Gllz," (with W. Altenhoff, P. G. Mezger and H. Wendker), Veroffentl. Sternwarte 59, Bonn, November 1961.
- "The Polarization of the Galactic 75-cm Radiation," (with C. L. Seeger, W. N. Brouw and J. Tinbergen), Bull. Astron. Inst. Neth., 16, 187, 1962.
- "The Structure of the Galaxy from Radio Observations," I.E.E.E. Trans., AP-12, 954, 1964.
- "A Survey of the Continuous Radiation at 400 Mc/s," (with C. L. Seeger, R. G. Conway and T. Hoekema), Bull. Astron. Inst. Neth., 18, 11, 1965.
- "A Catalogue of Discrete Sources Observed at 400 Mc/s," (with M. M. Davis and L. Gelato-Volders), Bull. Astron. Inst. Neth., 18, 42, 1965.
- "21-cm Line Emission in Open Clusters," (with W. E. Howard and C. Gordon), Astrophys. J., 154, 103, 1968.
- "The Maryland – Green Bank Galactic 21-cm Line Survey" (with H.-U.Wendlandt), Astron. Astrophys. Suppl. 49, 143, 1982.
- "Telescope Beam Characteristics and Temperature Scale of the Maryland- Green Bank 21-cm Line Survey" (with G.L.Mader and R.H.Harten), Astron. Astrophys. Suppl. 49, 137, 1982.
- "Astrometry and Precise Time", with G.M.R.Winkler, Oceanus 33, 89–95. 1991

Instrumentation or techniques

- "Table for the Reduction of Velocities to the Local Standard of Rest" (with D. A. MacRae), The Observatory, Lund, Sweden, 1956.
- "A Method for Accurately Compensating for the Effects of the Error Beam of the NRAO 300-foot Radio Telescope at 21-cm Wavelength," (with H.-U. Wendlandt and R. H. Harten), Astron. J., 78, 569, 1973.
- "Hydrogen 21-cm Line Temperature scale", (with R.H.Harten and F.J.Kerr), Astron.J., 80, 307, 1975

=== Papers presented at scientific meetings ===
Invited papers

- "Kosmische Bronnen Van Radiostraling," (with H. C. van de Hulst), Sterr. Coll. Ned. Astr. Club., 13, 1956.
- "A 21-cm Line Survey of the Outer Parts of the Galaxy," In IAU Symp. 4, ch. 5, Cambridge Univ. Press, 1957.
- "Progress Report on 21-cm Research by the Netherlands Foundation for Radio Astronomy and the Leiden Observatory," In IAU Symp 4, ch. 4, Cambridge Univ. Press, 1957.
- "Galactic Radiation and its Physical Interpretation", Introductory Report, Comm. V, URSI 13th General Assembly, London, 1960.
- "A Summary of our Knowledge of the Neutral Hydrogen in Galaxies", In Problems of Extra-Galactic Research, MacMillan and Co., New York, 1962.
- "Current Radio Astronomical Research in the Netherlands", Proc.I.R.E. Austr., 24, 214, 1963.
- "The Interpretation of Recent 21-cm Line Data in Terms of Large-Scale Galactic Structure," IAU Symp. 20, Australia, 1963.
- "Observation and Interpretation of Optical and Radio Polarization," IAU Symp. 20, Australia, 1963.
- "Three Years of Galactic Radio Astronomy," Proc. of URSI General Assembly, Tokyo, 1963.
- "Brightness Temperatures Expected for a Radio Telescope with High Resolving Power," In Proc. OECD Symp. on Large Antennae, Paris, 1963.
- "Site Requirements," In Proc. OECD Symp. on Large Antennae, Paris, 1963.
- "The Early History of Radio Astronomy", In International Conference on Education in and History of Modern Astronomy, ed. R. Berendzen, Ann. New York Acad. Sci., 198, 211, 1972.
- "Some Remarks on the Ideal Automated Observatory," In NRAO/IEEE/URSI Symp. on the Collection and Analysis of Astrophysical Data, ed. R. Burns, Astron. Astrophys. Suppl., 15, 327, 1974.
- "The Influence of Acquisition Techniques on the Compilation of Astronomical Data", in IAU Colloquium 35 on Data Compilation, Strasbourg 1976, ed. Jaschek and Wilkins, Reidel, Dordrecht, Astrophys. and Space Sc. Lib 64, 49, 1977
- "Future Development in U.S. Naval Observatory Time Services",

Proc. 9th Ann. PTTI meeting, NASA Tech. Mem. 78104, 1, 1978

- "Radio Astrometry and Other Accurate Astrometry Plans at the U.S. Naval Observatory", ESA Colloquium on European Satellite Astrometry, Padua, Ed. C.Barbiery and P.L.Bernacca, Universita di Padova 1979
- "Space Astrometry – its Impact on Astronomy and Astrophysics", Highlights of Astronomy Vol.5, 779, Ed. P.A.Wayman, Reidel Dordrecht 1980
- "Early Dutch Radio Astronomy", URSI General Assembly Comm. J, Washington 1981, Ed. W.T.Sullivan (not published).
- "The Pioneers of HI", in "Seeing through the Dust", eds. A.R.Taylor, T.L.Landecker, A.G.Willis, Astron. Soc. Pacific Conf.Ser. 276, 3, 2002
- "The Start of 21-cm line Research: the Early Dutch Years", in "Seeing Through the Dust", eds. A.R.Taylor, T.L.Landecker, A.G.Willis, Astron. Soc. Pacific Conf.Ser. 276, 3, 2002

Contributed papers

- "75-cm and 22-cm Continuum Surveys," In IAU Symp. 9, ch. 80, Stanford Univ. Press, 1959.
- "75-cm Galactic Background Polarization: Progress Report," (with W. N. Brouw, C. A. Muller and J. Tinbergen), Astron. J., 67, 590, 1962.
- "Radio Studies of HII Regions and Galactic Structure," (with M. Komesaroff), IAU Symp. 20, Australia, 1963.
- "Galactic 21-cm Iine Observations at Green Bank," Astron. J., 69, 152, 1964.
- "Preliminary Observations of 21-cm Line Emission in Open Clusters," (with W. L. Howard), Astron. J., 70, 688, 1965 (Abstract).
- "The Maryland-Green Bank Galactic 21-cm Line Survey'", IAU Symp. 31, Noordwijk, Netherlands, 173, Acad. Press, 1967.
- "A Motion Picture Film of Galactic 21-cm Line Emission," IAU Symp. 38, paper 19, ed. G. Contopoulos and R. Becker), Reidel, Dordrecht, 1970.
- "A High-Resolution Polarization Survey of the North Polar Spur," (with D. Bechis), ln IAU Symp. 60, ed. F. J. Kerr and S. C. Simonson, Springer Verlag, 1974.
- "Progress Report on the Maryland-Green Bank Galactic 21-cm Line Survey, In IAU Symp. 60, ed. F. J. Kerr and S. C. Simonson, Springer Verlag, 1974.
- "The U.S.Naval Observatory Parallax Program" (with R.H.Harrington), Bull. d'Inf. Centre de Donnees Stell. 20, 24, 1981
- "Data on Time and Polar Motion: Immediate Accessibility" (with D.D.McCarthy), I.A.U. Colloq. 64, Automated Data Retrieval in Astronomy, Strasbourg, Ed. C.Jaschek, Reidel Dordrecht, 1982
- "U.S.Naval Observatory Parallaxes and the Fundamental Reference Frame – their Interaction with Hipparcos" (with J.A.Hughes), ESA Colloquium on Space Astrometry, Strasbourg 1982
- "Concluding Remarks," in IAU Symposium 109, Astrometric Techniques, H.K. Eichhorn and R. J. Leacock (eds), Reidel Dordrecht, 799–803, 1986
- "Fricke's Influence on the World of Astronomy," Celestial Mechanics 37, 345–348, 1985
- "The USNO/CALTECH Measuring Program" (with D. Monet), Bull d'Information du CDS 37, 75–78, 1989
- "Concluding Remarks," Bull d'Information du CDS 37, 91–92, 1989
- "Astrometry: New Vitality for an Ancient Science," Aerospace America 27, No. 10, 34–37, 1989
- "The Flagstaff Measuring Machine" (with D. Monet), in IAU Symposium 141, Inertial Coordinate System on the Sky, J.H.Lieske and V.K.Abalakin, Eds., Kluwer Dordrecht 1990
- "Concluding Remarks", in IAU Symposium 141, Inertial Coordinate System on the Sky, J.H.Lieske and V.K.Abalakin, Eds, Kluwer Dordrecht, 1990

=== Books or contributions to edited books ===
- "The Radio Galaxy," Sci. Am., 201, 45, 1959.
- "The Mapping of the Galaxy," In Tomorrow was Yesterday, C.B.S., George Braziller, New York, 1964.
- "Distribution of Interstellar Hydrogen," (with F. J. Kerr), ch. 8, in Stars and Stellar Systems, vol. 5, p. 166, Univ. of Chicago Press,1965
- "Radio Emission of the Galaxy," Comm. 40 report, IAU Trans. XII A, Acad. Press, 1965.
- "Galactic Radio Astronomy," Comm. 40 reports on Astronomy, lAU Trans. XIVA, 460, Reidel, Dordrecht – Holland, 1970.
- "Galactic Radio Emission in the 21-cm Line and the Continuum," In Galactic Astronomy, ed. H. Y. Chiu and A. Muriel, pp. 147–190, Gordon and Breach, 1971.

=== Technical reports and others ===
- "The Maryland-Green Bank Galactic 21-cm Line Survey," first edition, University of Maryland, Department of Physics and Astronomy, 1966.
- "Maryland-Green Bank 21-cm Line Survey," second edition, University of Maryland Astronomy Program, 1969.
