= Dintel =

River in the Netherlands

Coordinates: 51°38′N 4°25′E

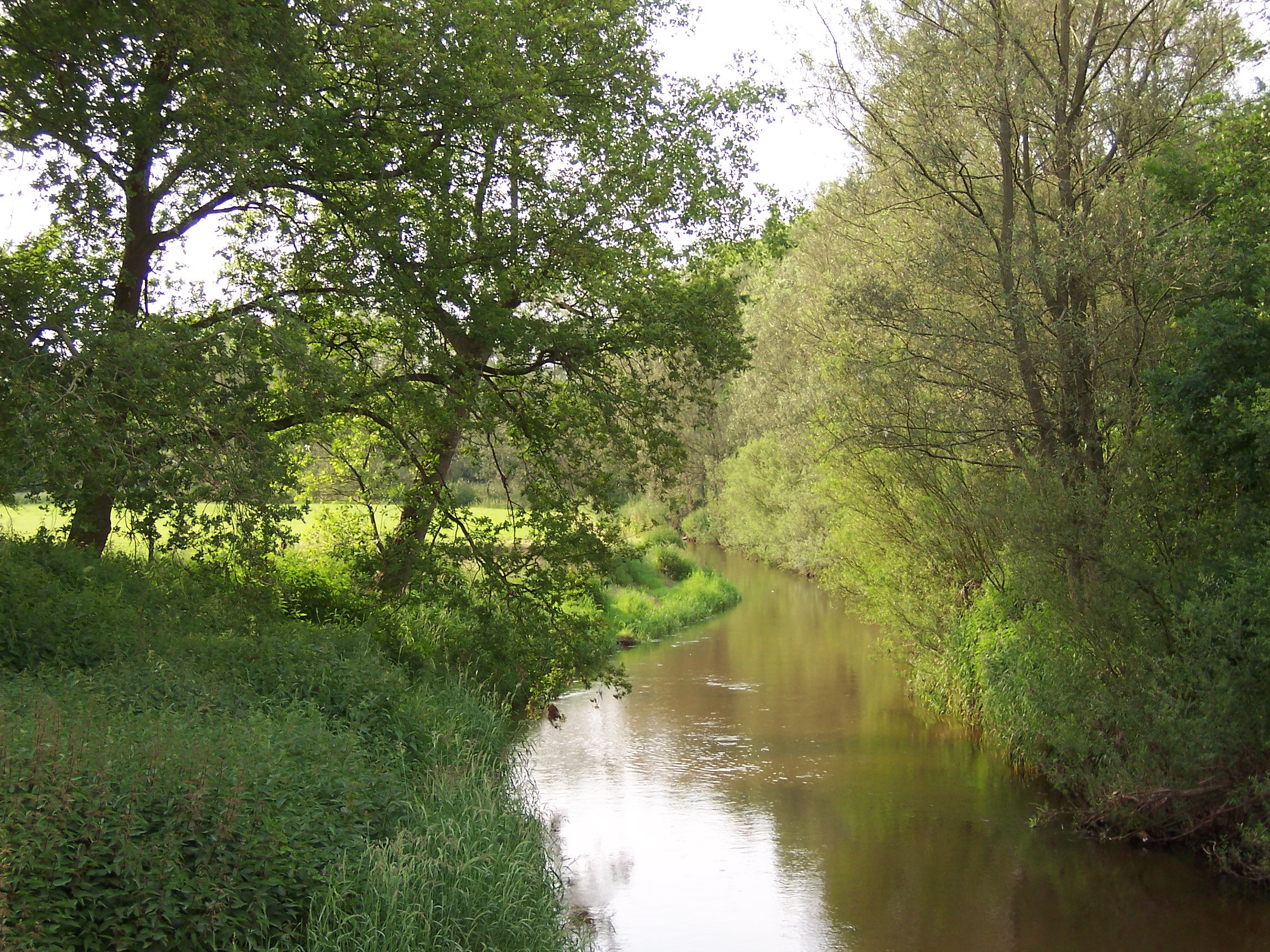

The Dintel is a river in North Brabant that runs from Oudenbosch to Standdaarbuiten.

It rises in Belgium as the Mark.

== History ==
The Dintel is mentioned in the 13th century as the name Dindel or Dindele. After the St. Elizabeth's flood (1421), the Dintel was considered more of a sea than a river. After the surrounding land was further drained, the Dintel became narrower. The Dintel ended with locks in the early 19th century, thus disappeared the tide of Dintel.
