= Van Wijk (crater) =

Crater on the Moon

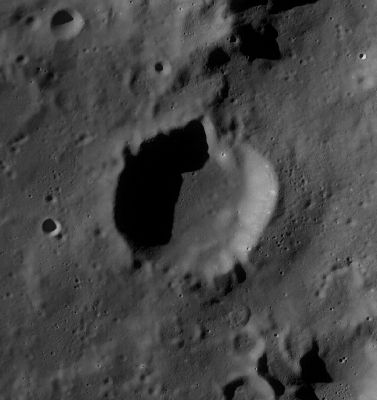
- Coordinates: 62.8°S 118.8°E
- Diameter: 32 km
- Depth: Unknown
- Colongitude: 242° at sunrise
- Eponym: Uco van Wijk

Van Wijk is a small lunar impact crater located in the southern part of the far side of the Moon. It lies to the north-northwest of a huge walled plain named Schrödinger, and to the southwest of the crater Fechner.

The rim of this crater has a noticeable outward bulge toward the south, but it remains relatively circular overall. The perimeter is mostly sharp-edged, with some wear along the north and northwest faces. The inner walls slope down evenly towards the relatively flat and featureless interior of the crater.
