= Uco van Wijk =

Dutch astronomer and educator

Uco van Wijk (20 May 1924, Jogjakarta, Dutch East Indies – 10 August 1966) was a Dutch astronomer and educator who founded the astronomy program at the University of Maryland and was instrumental in bringing Gart Westerhout from the Netherlands to become Department Head. He graduated from Harvard University with a BA in 1948 and a PhD in 1952.

== Honors ==
- The crater Van Wijk on the Moon is named after him.
- The astronomy library at the University of Maryland is named after him.
- The Sundial located in the center of McKeldin Mall on the campus was originally a gift from the Class of 1965, the Department of Physics and Astronomy, and friends of Professor Uco Van Wijk. It was renovated with donations from the Class of 1990.
