= Guillaume Fillastre =

French cardinal, canonist, humanist and geographer

His Eminence Guillaume Fillastre
- Cardinal-Priest of San Marco
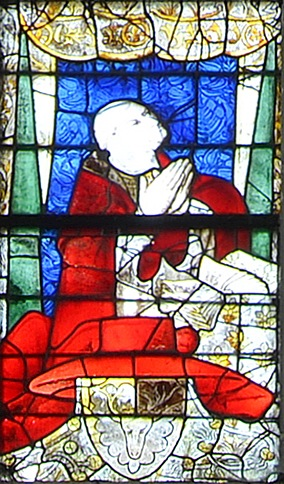
- Cardinal Fillastre in stained glass located at Le Mans Cathedral
- Church: Catholic Church
- Appointed: 6 June 1411
- Term ended: 6 November 1428
- Predecessor: Antonio Calvi
- Successor: Angelotto Fosco
- Other posts: Archpriest of Saint John Lateran (1422-1428)

Orders
- Created cardinal: 6 June 1411 by Antipope John XXIII (Confirmed by Pope Martin V)
- Rank: Cardinal-Priest

Personal details
- Born: Maine, France
- Died: 6 November 1428 (aged 79–80) Rome, Papal States
- Coat of arms

Guillaume Fillastre, sometimes called the Elder (1348 – 6 November 1428), was a French cardinal, canonist, humanist, and geographer.

== Life ==
Fillastre was born at La Suze, Maine. After graduating as doctor juris utriusque, Fillastre taught jurisprudence at Reims, and in 1392 was appointed dean of its metropolitan chapter. During the Western Schism he showed at first much sympathy for Benedict XIII (Peter de Luna). In 1409, however, he took part in the attempt to reconcile the factions at the Council of Pisa. Antipope John XXIII conferred on him and his friend Pierre d'Ailly the dignity of cardinal (1411), and in 1413 he was made Archbishop of Aix. Fillastre took a very important part in the Council of Constance, where he and Cardinal d'Ailly were the first to agitate the question of the abdication of the rival claimants (February, 1415). He gained distinction through the many legal questions on which he gave decisions. Pope Martin V, in whose election he had been an important factor, appointed him legatus a latere to France (1418), where he was to promote the cause of Church unity. In recognition of his successful efforts in this capacity, he was made Archpriest of the Lateran Basilica. In 1421 he resigned the See of Aix, and in 1422 was assigned to the See of Saint-Pons-de-Thomières. He died at Rome in his eightieth year, as Cardinal-Priest of San Marco.

== Works ==
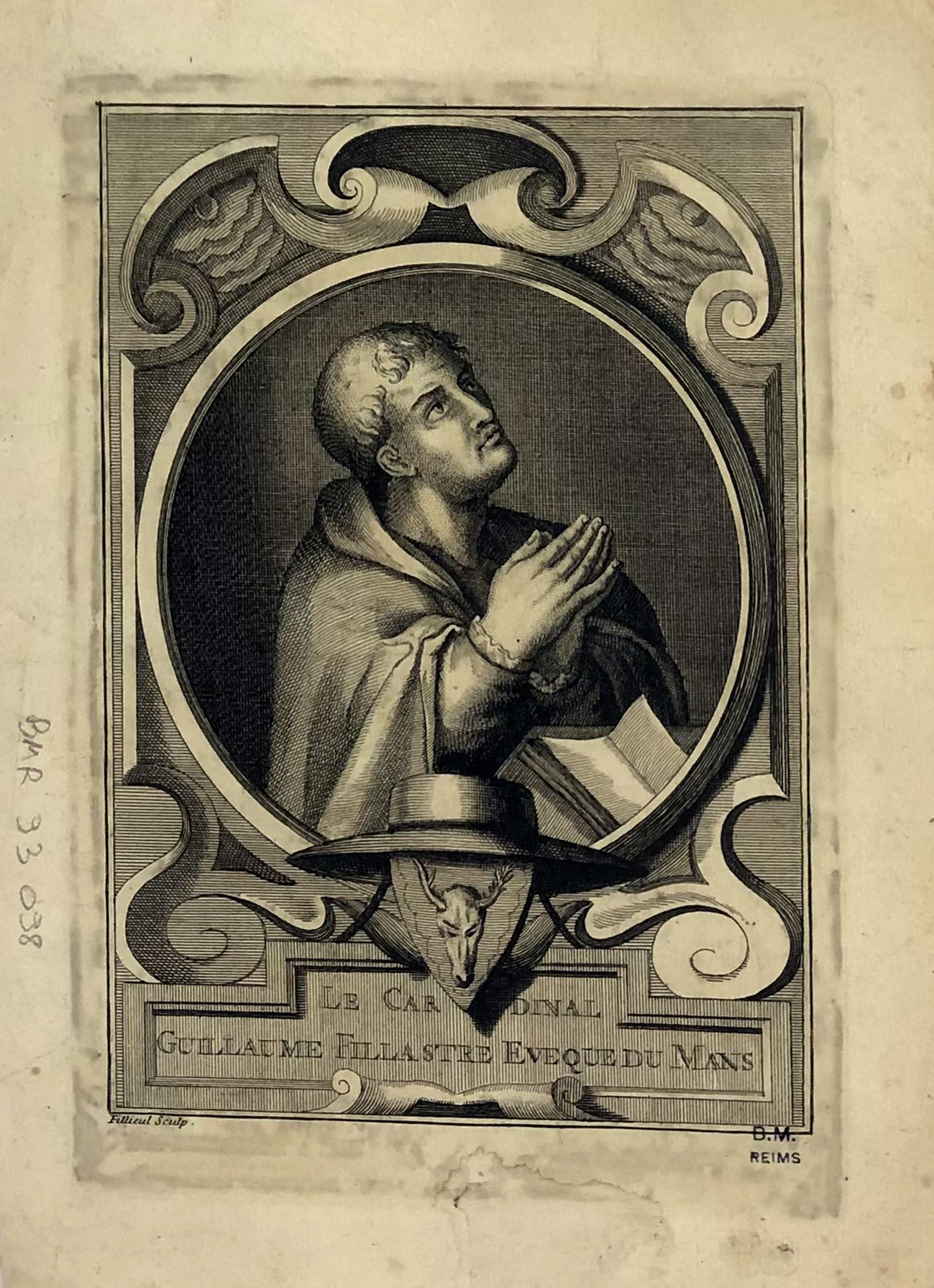
Guillaume Fillastre, engraving by Pierre Filloeul (1731)

During the Council of Constance Fillastre kept a diary discovered by Heinrich Finke, first reviewed by him in the Römische Quartalschrift (1887), and there partly edited by him. It has been described by some as the most important historical source for the Council of Constance, and was edited by Finke in its entirety in 1889 (in his Forschungen und Quellen, pp. 163–242). Fillastre's notes throw new light on the principal participants in the council, as well as on the two popes who were deposed and their trial, on the college of cardinals as a body, and in particular on Cardinals d'Ailly, Fillastre, Zabarella, etc. Fillastre is our only authority concerning the preliminary motions on the method of voting and the extremely difficult position of the college of Cardinals; he gives us our first clear conception of the quarrels that arose among the "nations" over the matter of precedence, and the place which the Spanish "nation" held at the council; he also furnishes the long-sought explanation of the confirmation of Sigismund as Holy Roman Emperor by Martin V. Fillastre's diary derives its highest value, however, from the exposition of the relations between the king and the council and the description of the conclave.

While Fillastre was in Constance (where, it may be remarked, he translated several of Plato's works into Latin), he rendered important services to the history of geography and cartography, as well as to the history of the council. Thus he had copied the Latin translation of Ptolemy's geography (without maps), which had been completed by Jacopo d'Angelo in 1409, a manuscript he had great difficulty in securing from Florence. Together with this precious Ptolemy codex, he sent in 1418 to the chapter-library of Reims, which he had founded and already endowed with many valuable manuscripts, a large map of the world traced on walrus skin, and a codex of Pomponius Mela. The two geographical codices are reportedly still preserved as precious "cimelia" in the municipal library of Reims, but the map of the world disappeared during the eighteenth century.

About 1425 Fillastre wrote one of his most important canonical works on interest and usury; it has been handed down in numerous manuscripts. In 1427, though now an old man, he had the maps of Ptolemy drawn from a Greek original, but on a diminished scale, and arranged with Latin terminology, to go with his Latin Ptolemy. Since Ptolemy had no knowledge of the Scandinavian Peninsula, much less of Greenland, Fillastre completed his codex by adding to Ptolemy's ten maps of Europe an eleventh. This "eleventh map of Europe", with the subjoined detailed description of Denmark, Sweden, Norway, and Greenland, is according to the Catholic Encyclopedia the only existing copy of the "first map" of Claudius Clavus, "the first cartographer of America", and is reportedly still preserved in the municipal library of Nancy.
