= Wuustwezel =

- Municipality
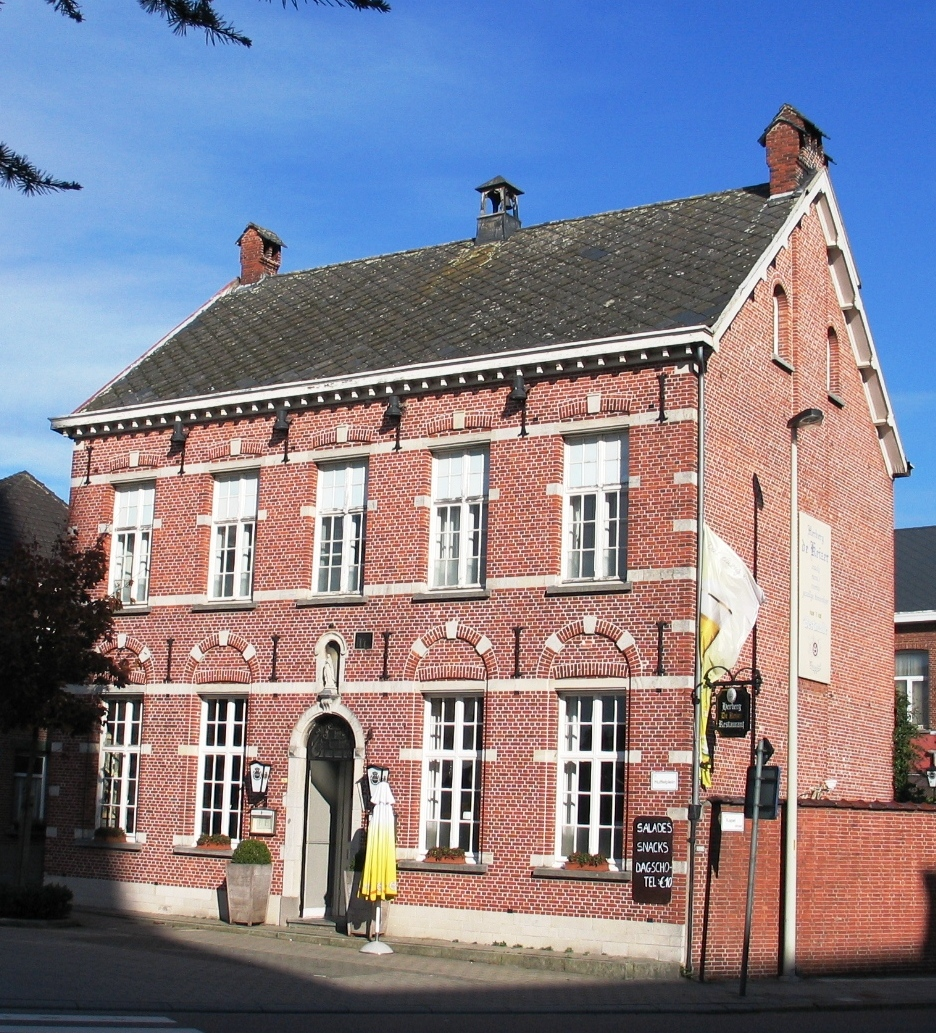
- Inn De Keizer Loenhout

- Flag Coat of arms

- Location of Wuustwezel in Antwerp Province
- Interactive map of Wuustwezel
- Location in Belgium
- Coordinates: 51°23′N 04°36′E
- Country: Belgium
- Community: Flemish Community
- Region: Flemish Region
- Province: Antwerp
- Arrondissement: Antwerp

Government
  - Mayor: Dieter Wouters (CD&V)
  - Governing party: CD&V

Area
  - Total: 89.41 km^{2} (34.52 sq mi)

Population (2018-01-01)
  - Total: 20,671
  - Density: 231.2/km^{2} (598.8/sq mi)
- Postal codes: 2990
- NIS code: 11053
- Area codes: 03
- Website: www.wuustwezel.be

Wuustwezel (Dutch pronunciation: [ʋystˈʋeːzəl]) is a municipality located in the north of the Belgian province of Antwerp.

The municipality as it is now originated in 1977, when Wuustwezel merged with the municipality of Loenhout. It now consists of three major villages, Wuustwezel proper, Gooreind and Loenhout, and two minor hamlets, Braken and Sterbos.

In 2021, Wuustwezel had a total population of 21,346. The total area is 89.43 km^{2}.

The Azencross Loenhout is a December cyclo-cross competition, which is part of the BPost Bank Trophy. The largest bloemencorso (flower parade) of Belgium is held in Loenhout. All the villages and hamlets in the area compete who has the most beautiful floats made out of flowers.

Its neighbouring municipalities are Zundert in the Netherlands, Kalmthout, Kapellen, Brasschaat, Brecht and Hoogstraten.

Wuustwezel has the postal code 2990.
