= Van Wyk =

van Wyk is a common Afrikaans surname, derived from the Dutch Van Wijk. Notable people with the surname include:

- Abraham Erasmus van Wyk (born 1952), South African taxonomist
- Ben-Erik van Wyk (born 1956), South African taxonomist
- Arnold van Wyk (1916–1983), South African composer
- Christopher van Wyk (1957–2014), South African writer
- Coenie van Wyk (born 1988), South African rugby union player
- D. J. Van Wyk (died 1902), a Member of the Cape House of Assembly for Riverdale
- Diaan van Wyk (born 1981), South African cricketer
- Ferdi van Wyk, (1942–2019) South African officer
- Hermanus van Wyk (1835–1905), Namibian tribal chief
- Inke van Wyk (born 1971), South African field hockey player
- Jandre van Wyk (born 1989), South African cricketer
- Janine van Wyk (born 1987), South African association football player
- Kruger van Wyk (born 1980), New Zealand cricketer
- Lenert van Wyk (born 1989), South African cricketer
- Morne van Wyk (born 1979), South African cricketer
- N. P. van Wyk Louw (1906–1970), South African poet and playwright
- Ruben Van Wyk (born 1976), Namibian footballer
