= Wyck =

Wyck may refer to:

- WYCK, a Pennsylvanian AM broadcasting radio station
- Wyck, Hampshire, a village in England
- Wyck House, a historic house in Philadelphia, Pennsylvania
- Wyck (Maastricht), a neighbourhood in Maastricht, Netherlands

== See also ==
- Wick (disambiguation)
- Wyk (disambiguation)
