= Van Wyck, Washington =

Unincorporated community in Washington, US

- Unincorporated community
- Location within Washington (state)
- Coordinates: 48°48′13″N 122°25′15″W
- Country: United States
- State: Washington
- County: Whatcom
- Established: 1891
- Elevation: 207 ft (63 m)
- Time zone: UTC-8 (Pacific (PST))
  - Summer (DST): UTC-7 (PDT)
- Area code(s): 360, 564
- GNIS feature ID: 1511389

Van Wyck is an unincorporated community in Whatcom County, in the U.S. state of Washington.

== History ==
A post office called Van Wyck was established in 1891, and remained in operation until 1904. The community has the name of Alexander Van Wyck.
