= Jaak van Wijck =

Dutch painter (1870–1946)

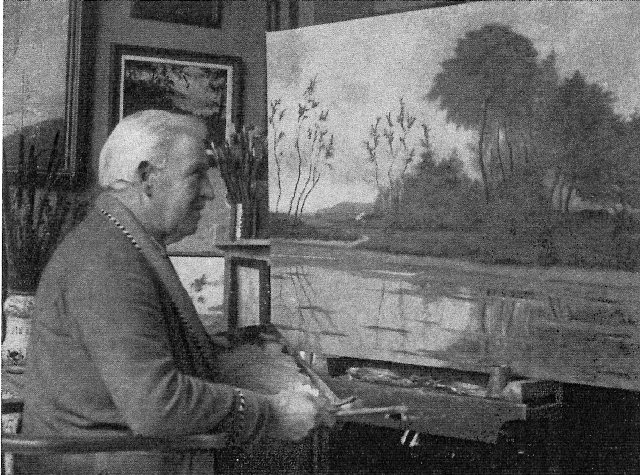
- Born: Jacobus Johannes Wilhelmus van Wijck; September 11, 1870; Ginneken, Netherlands
- Died: June 3, 1946 (aged 75); Antwerp, Belgium
- Occupation: Painter
- Known for: Landscape paintings of the De Mark river

Jacobus Johannes Wilhelmus "Jaak" van Wijck (September 11, 1870 in Ginneken, Netherlands – June 3, 1946 in Antwerp, Belgium) was a Dutch landscape painter. He was known for his paintings of locations on the Kalmthoutse Heide (De Kempen) close to Antwerp, and also at Ginneken, a village close to Breda, where he painted the river De Mark along with other landmarks.

As a student of the "Stedelijk Tekeninstituut", located in the city Breda, he received several awards. Later, at the "Koninklijke Academie voor Schoone Kunsten" in Antwerp and the "Hooger Gesticht" there, he was notable again by winning prizes, e.g. in 1895, when he was awarded with two particular medals "on behalf of Léopold II Roi des Belges".

In 1903, shortly after his studies in Breda, he showed his work at the famous "Salon Triennal des Beaux-Arts" in Brussels. He also displayed his art in several salons in Antwerp.

In addition to his work as an independent artist, Van Wijck manufactured glass in lead with his partner Jozef Gussenhoven, in the Vinkenstraat in Antwerp often in Jugendstil/Art Deco.

== Art direction ==
Van Wijck is known for his work as a landscape painter, outside painter (pleinairisme), Flemish and Jugendstil. He was a member of the large Antwerp artist association "De Scalden", later on also of "WIJ" and "Eigen Vorming". He became a very active board member of the - now "Royal" - "Vereeniging voor Natuur- en Stedenschoon" in which his wife Reine van Wijck-Schoeters also played a prominent role as chairperson of the ladies' committee. He made portraits and drawings during his time at the Academy in Antwerp. He also experimented with waterpainting and postermaking.

== Painted locations ==
In Flanders: "De Kalmthoutse Heide" (among other things the Putse Moer, Peerdsbosch, Brasschaat), a pond of earl Vilain XIV (at Kruibeke), Turnhout, De Laarsche beek, De Liereman, Schelle, Schilde, Meerseldreef, Massenhoven (Viersel) Lammerenberg and the river De Schelde, and in Antwerp and its immediate surroundings.

In the Netherlands (North Brabant): Ginneken (Breda), the river De Mark, Bouvigne castle, Ulvenhout and Woensel (Eindhoven). Most of these locations are situated near Ginneken (Breda), the place where he was born, and in De Kempen (Flanders and North Brabant) close to Antwerp, where he spent the largest part of his life. He painted there during several seasons and focused on the nature setting including woods, heathland landscapes, farms, moors, orchards, mills, riversights, birds, flowers and interieurs.

== Museums ==
Some important works of Jaak van Wijck are exhibited in museums in Belgium and The Netherlands including the "het Archief en Museum voor Vlaamse Cultuur (AMCV)" in Antwerp (Belgium), the "Breda's Museum" in Breda (the Netherlands) and in Museum Kempenland, Eindhoven (The Netherlands).

Most of his work is privately owned by individuals living in Belgium, The Netherlands, Germany and the United States.

His family has established, with collaboration of some experts, a catalogue of approx. 235 paintings of Jaak van Wijck as well as a description of his life, history and personality. Based on this catalogue, an Internet site has been composed containing a limited selection of his works of art. The family is actively in search of more works from Jaak van Wijck.

== Literature ==
- De Belgische kunstenaars uit de 19e en 2oe eeuw (English: "The Belgian Artists from the 19th and 20th Centuries"), Piron, Paul; Bruxelles 1999.
