= Svetislav Simić =

Serbian diplomat

- Светислав Симић
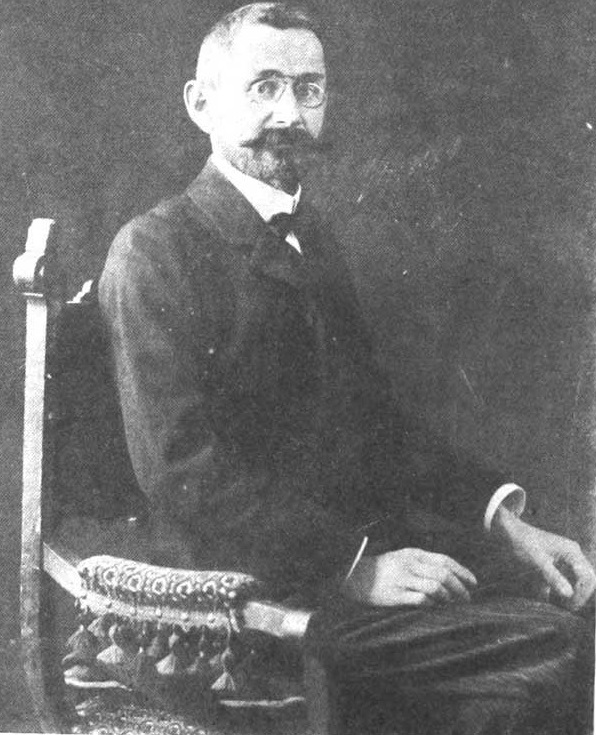

Personal details
- Born: March 4, 1865 Užice, Principality of Serbia
- Died: March 8, 1911 (aged 46) Leysen, Switzerland
- Education: University of Belgrade
- Occupation: Diplomat, journalist

Svetislav Simić (Serbian: Светислав Симић; 4 March 1865 — 8 March 1911) was a Serbian diplomat and journalist who was one of the most deserving civil servants for helping and organizing the Serbian Chetnik Organization in Macedonia.

== Early life and education ==
Simić was born on 4 March 1865 in Užice, at the time part of the Principality of Serbia. He attended middle school in Užice and Knjaževac, and high school in Požarevac and Belgrade. Simić graduated at the Faculty of Philosophy at the University of Belgrade and spent one year studying in Saint Petersburg.

== Diplomatic career ==
He worked as a teacher for several years and in 1894 he became secretary of the Ministry of Foreign Affairs of the Kingdom of Serbia, and in 1898 was named a Consul in Priština, at the time still part of the Ottoman Empire. Along with Jovan Jovanović Pižon, he was one of the most deserving civil servants for helping and organizing the Serbian Chetnik Organization in Macedonia. He helped Bogdan Radenković make better contact with the Serbian government. In July 1904, he became a diplomatic agent in Sofia. After the Bulgarian Declaration of Independence in 1908, he became an ambassador in Sofia and remained in that position until he went to Switzerland for treatment. He died on 8 March 1911 in Leysin, Switzerland.

== Journalism career ==
He was active in journalism all his life. He founded and edited Constitutional Serbia, and also participated in the founding of the Serbian Literary Herald. [1] He was the founder of Delo and the editor and contributor to many newspapers: Odjek, Dnevni List, Javor, Zora, Nastavnik and Prosvetni Glasnik. He printed many treatises and pamphlets including; Macedonian Question, Radicals and Our National Policy, Serbs and Albanians, Old Serbia and Albanians. He usually signed himself under the pseudonym Pavle Orlović.

== Selected works ==
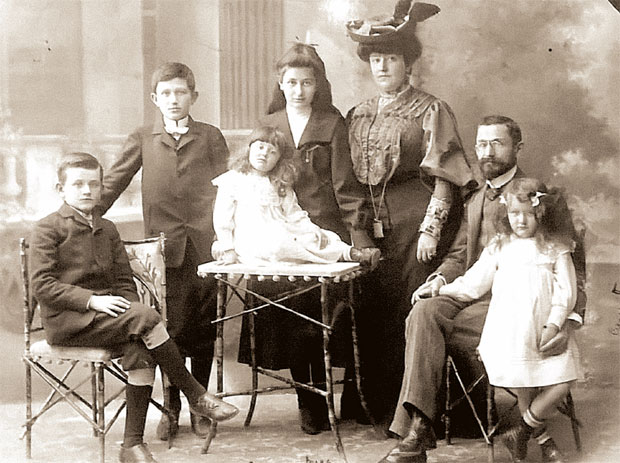
Simić (on the right) with his family

Simić, Svetislav (1902). Скопаљско владичанско питање 1897-1902. Belgrade.
