= Oosterweel =

Oosterweel may refer to:

- Oosterweel, Belgium, a village near Antwerp
- Battle of Oosterweel, 1567, traditionally viewed as the beginning of the Eighty Years' War
- Oosterweel Link, a long running proposed construction project intended to complete the Antwerp Ring Road
