= Leysen =

Leysen is a surname. Notable people with the surname include:

- André Leysen (1927–2015), Belgian businessman
- Bart Leysen (born 1969), Belgian cyclist
- Christian Leysen (born 1954), Belgian businessman
- Fedde Leysen (born 2003), Belgian footballer
- Johan Leysen (born 1950), Belgian actor
- Louis Leysen (1932–2009), Belgian international footballer
- Senne Leysen (born 1996), Belgian cyclist
- Thomas Leysen (born 1960), Belgian entrepreneur
- Tobe Leysen (born 2002), Belgian footballer
