= Ringland (organisation) =

Non-governmental organization in Antwerp, Belgium

Ringland (officially Ringgenootschap vzw) is a non-governmental organization in Antwerp, Belgium, that is demanding that the authorities install a roof covering over the entire ring road around Antwerp.

== History ==
After comparison of different options in the environmental effects report, in the beginning of 2014 the Flemish Government chose the BAM track to complete the ring road, in combination with a tunnel under the Albert Canal. That tunnel was a new element. Ringland came up with more demands and insisted on a roof on the entire Ring. Ringland claims this would lead to less pollution and damage by (ultra)fine particles, and less noise disturbance, hence enhancing the liveability of the environment.

In June 2015 the Ringland band - consisting of local artists Styrofoam, Marcel Vanthilt, Bart Peeters, Slongs Dievanongs, Merdan Taplak, Pieter Embrechts and Halve Neuro - created the protest song Laat de Mensen Dansen ("Let the People Dance"). The title was not emitted by the main Flemish broadcasting companies VRT and Medialaan because of the political tone.

The Ringland Festival has already taken place twice, both times as a fund raiser for research on the roofing of the ring road. At the first edition on 15 June 2014 15,000 visitors appeared, and 20,000 at the second edition on 27 June 2015. The festival symbolically took place on top of the Craeybeckx Tunnel, which guides the E19 road under the Middelheim park and hospital.

== Claims ==
The main reasons the organisation gives for realisation of the project, besides the reduction of pollution and noise, are smoother and safer road traffic and additional space including green areas.

== See also ==
- Oosterweel Link
