= Oosterweel Link =

Proposed river crossing in Antwerp, Belgium

Coordinates: 51.2419°N 4.40806°E

The Oosterweel Link is a construction project first proposed in 1996, intended to complete the R1 Antwerp Ring Road in Antwerp, Belgium. The firm Antwerp Mobility Management Company (name changed to Lantis in 2019), is the Flemish Government controlled organisation assigned responsibility for the project. The Oosterweel link will connect the Expressweg (E34) near Blokkersdijk via a toll tunnel (the Oosterweeltunnel) underneath the Scheldt, leading to a dual-layered tunnel under the Albert Canal and connecting with the Antwerp Ring Road at Merksem and Deurne.

The cost of "the project of the century", as this large infrastructure project is often called in Belgium, is estimated at 10 billion euros. In an independent cost-benefit analysis conducted by Transport & Mobility Leuven in 2010, it was found that for the Oosterweel connection the estimated infrastructure costs were approximately five times higher than the societal benefits, such as travel time gains, reduced traffic congestion, lower environmental damage, and fewer accidents. The study also found that road pricing has a significant positive effect on congestion levels and travel times. In an earlier study by KU Leuven (2005), in which alternative investment and tolling regimes for a Scheldt crossing were modelled, the net welfare gain of tolling the Kennedytunnel was estimated at €466,804 per day.

== Characteristics ==
The Flemish Government wishes to improve access to the city of Antwerp as well as to the port, to relieve traffic congestion on the Antwerp Ring Road and to reduce "rat running" commuter traffic in the larger urban area.

The Oosterweel Link is one element, the largest by cost, of a general Antwerp Masterplan for transport. The Masterplan consists of sixteen infrastructure projects for roads, waterways and inland shipping, public transport, docks and solutions for pedestrians and cyclists. These Masterplan projects are intended to improve quality of life, traffic safety and mobility throughout the urban area, the port and surrounding towns and districts.

== History ==
=== Van den Brande-government IV (20 June 1995 – 13 June 1999) ===
In his opening speech on October 4, 1996 Camille Paulus, governor of the province of Antwerp at the time, mentioned the 'multimodal traffic model', a computer model developed to study mobility in the Antwerp area. At the governor's request, this model was used to elaborate a solution to congestion problems in and around Antwerp. From this model, it was deduced that an additional river crossing would lead to a spectacular amelioration of mobility and practically relegate congestion on the Antwerp ring road to the past. Eddy Peetermans, who was responsible for the realization of this traffic model for the province of Antwerp, presented as the solution a 5 km long underground road – a tunnel. Because of financial restrictions, this would take the form of a combination of demand control measures (toll, communal traffic etc.) and demand driven measures (more infrastructure). Completing the Ring Road by means of a northern addition would be the only way to prevent total traffic chaos in 2010, was the engineer's conclusion at the time.

In his New Year's speech in January 1998, Mr. Marc Van Peel, party leader for CVP (the Christian democrats, now renamed CD&V) announced that a definitive decision regarding the construction and financing of a third connection between the river banks, in the form of a bridge at Oosterweel, would be taken in the course of that same year. He stated that the financial feasibility of the project clearly depended on the possibility it offered for levying toll on vehicles using the new infrastructure. Since 1999 and 2000 were election years, the party leader deemed this period to be less than propitious for launching a new system that was not expected to gain great popular support. In June 1998, daily newspaper De Tijd carried a story about disagreements within the government on the subject of its proposed traffic mobility policies. The CVP accused the SP (Socialist Party) of 'proposing unattainable measures'. The SP suspected the CVP 'of blocking mobility policies in order to demand this post for a Christian democrat after the elections'.

In October 1998, the Flemish government decided to complete the Antwerp Ring, and accordingly modified the relevant district plan. In April 1999, Minister of Finance Wivina Demeester (CVP) emphasised that the completion of the Antwerp Ring Road was to be considered one of the next Flemish Government's priorities. Just before the election on June 13, 1999, the mayors of 30 Antwerp towns signed a regional charter with Wivina De Meester, stating that all parties had agreed to embark on a number of so-called leverage projects – one of which would be the closing of the Antwerp Ring Road – intended as an economic boost for Antwerp and the surrounding area. On the occasion of the charter's official presentation, the Minister also explained that a Public-Private-Partnership would be a perfectly suitable tool for the completion of the R1 ring road.

On June 10, 1999, the engineering consultancy agency ABM (Atenco, Belgroma and Maunsell) started investigating 6 proposed road layouts: 1 featuring a bridge ("Brug" in image #1) over the River Scheldt, 5 featuring tunnels.

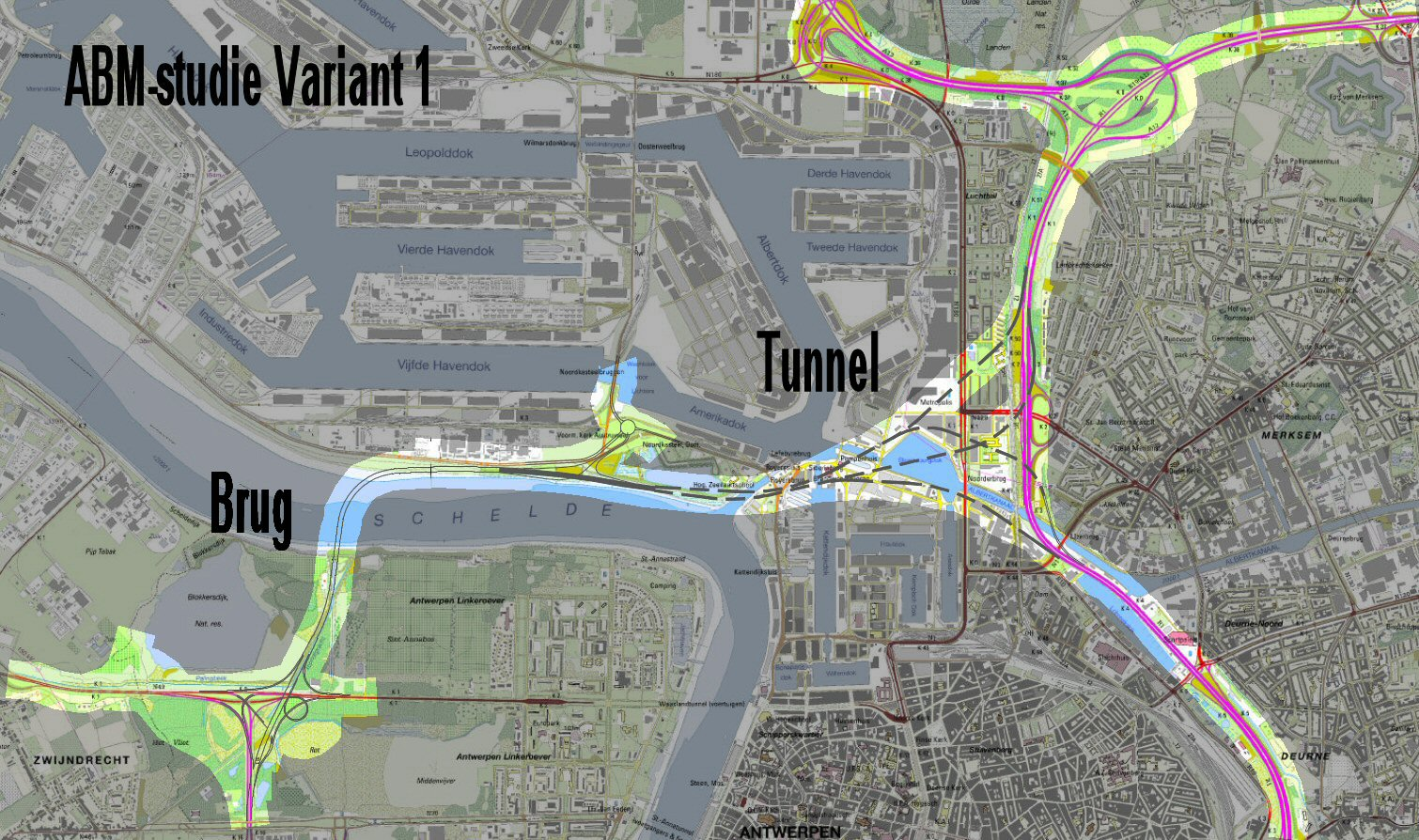
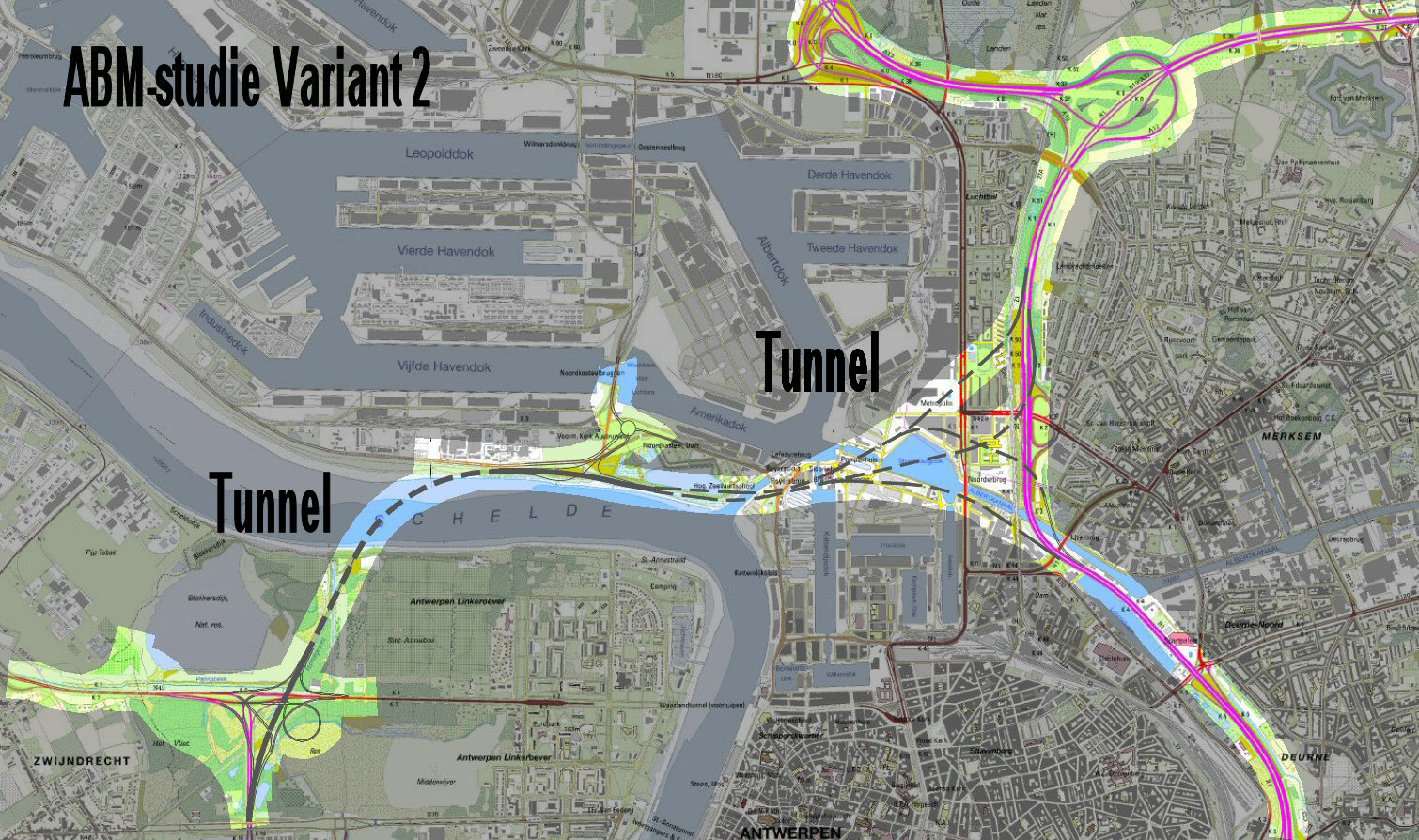
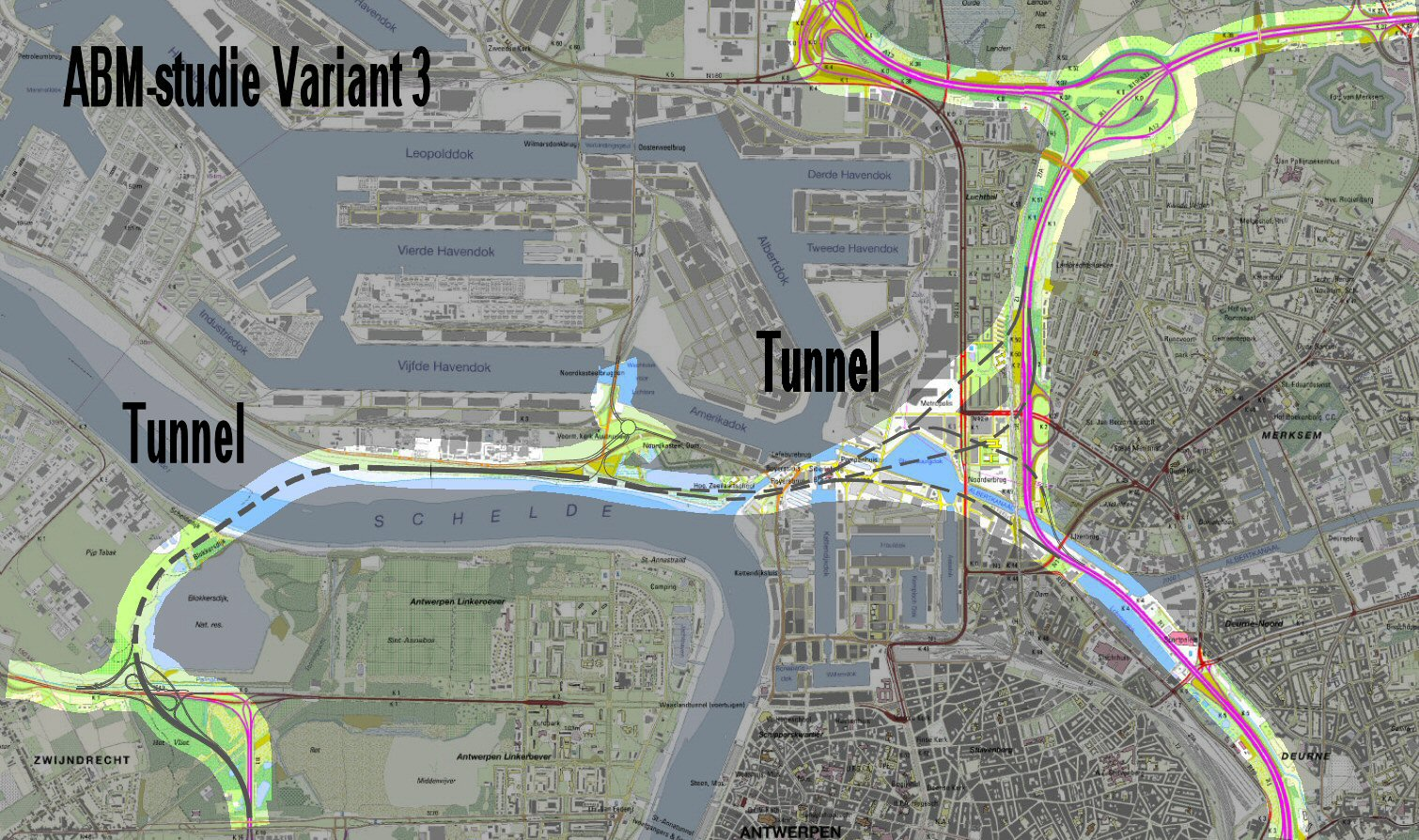
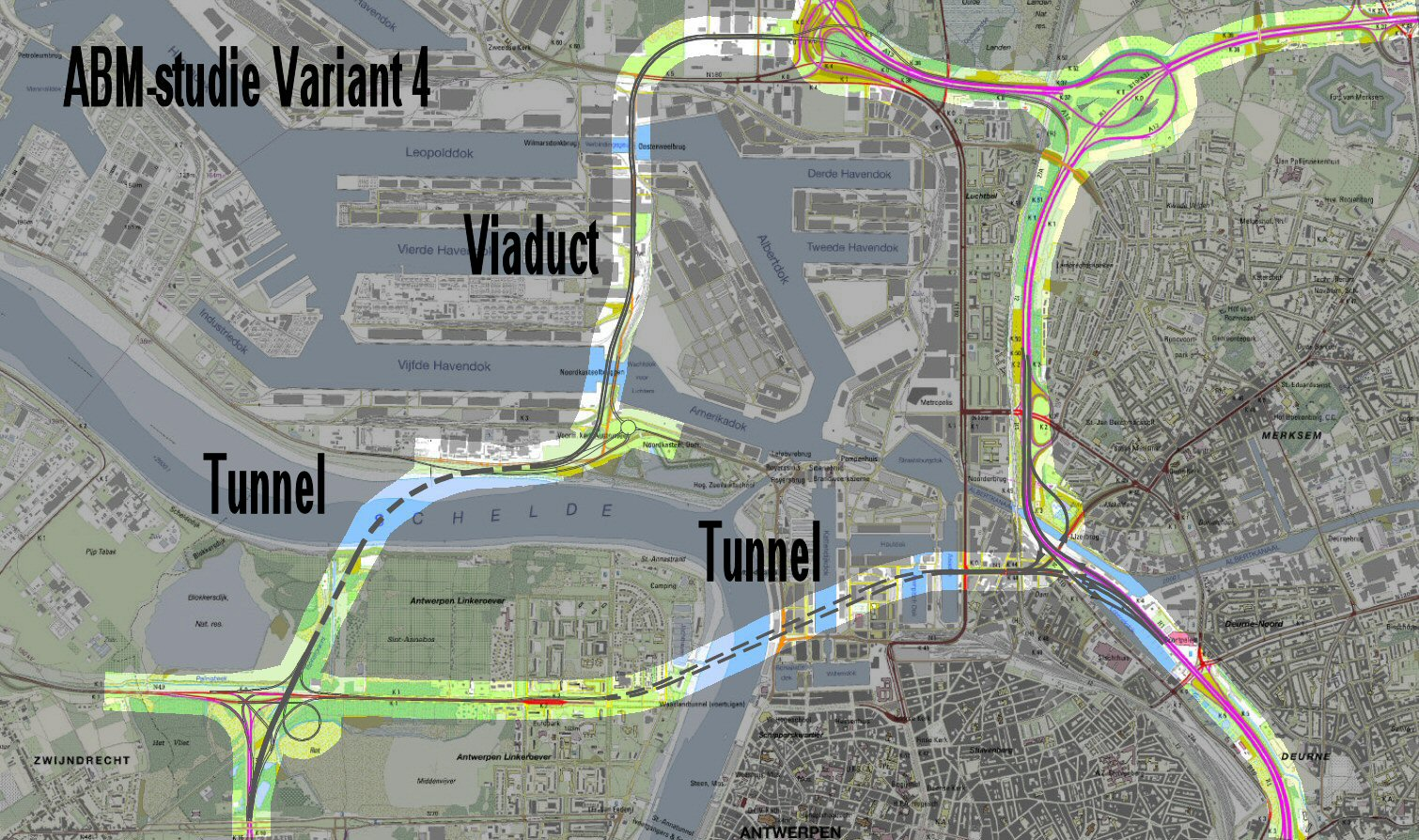
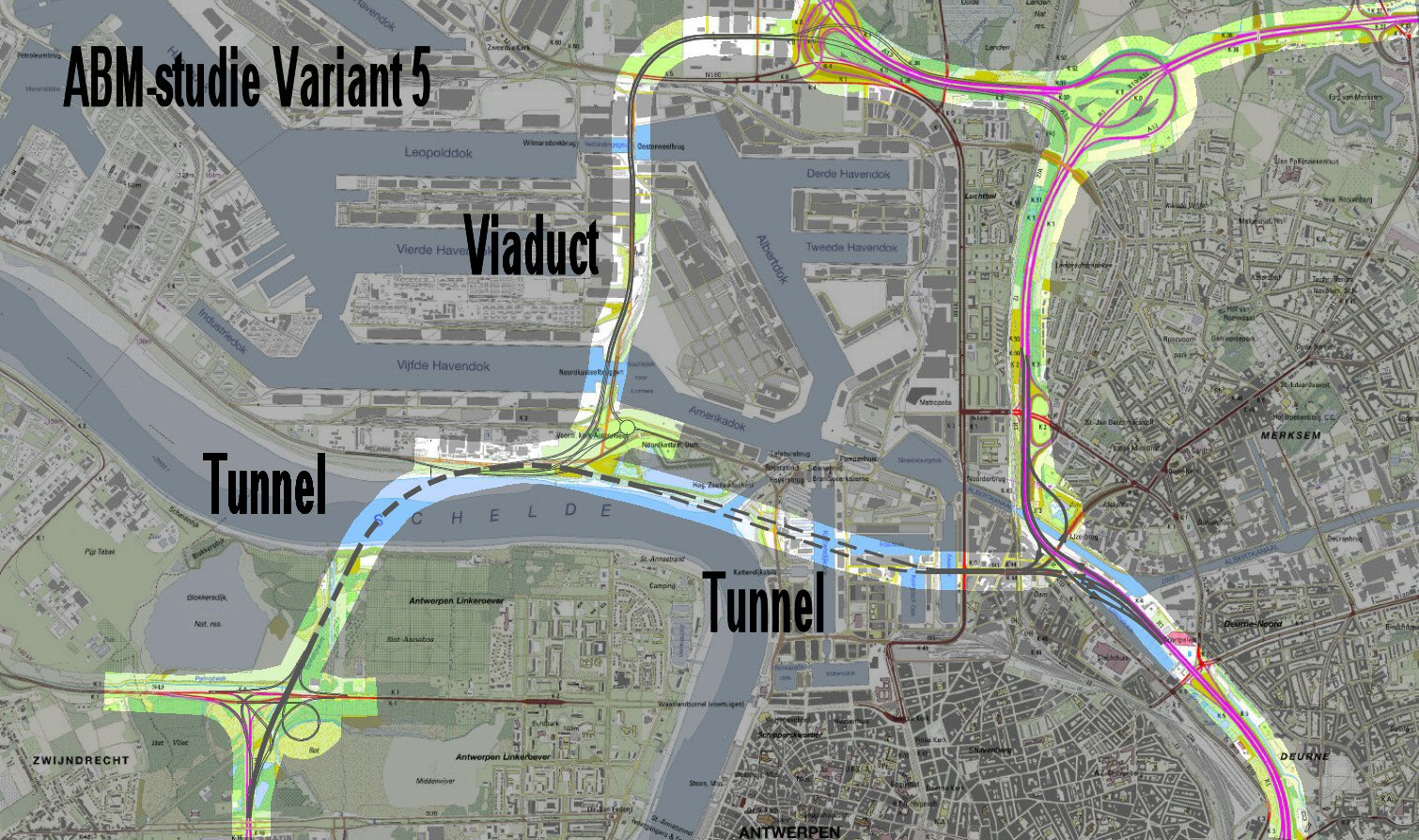
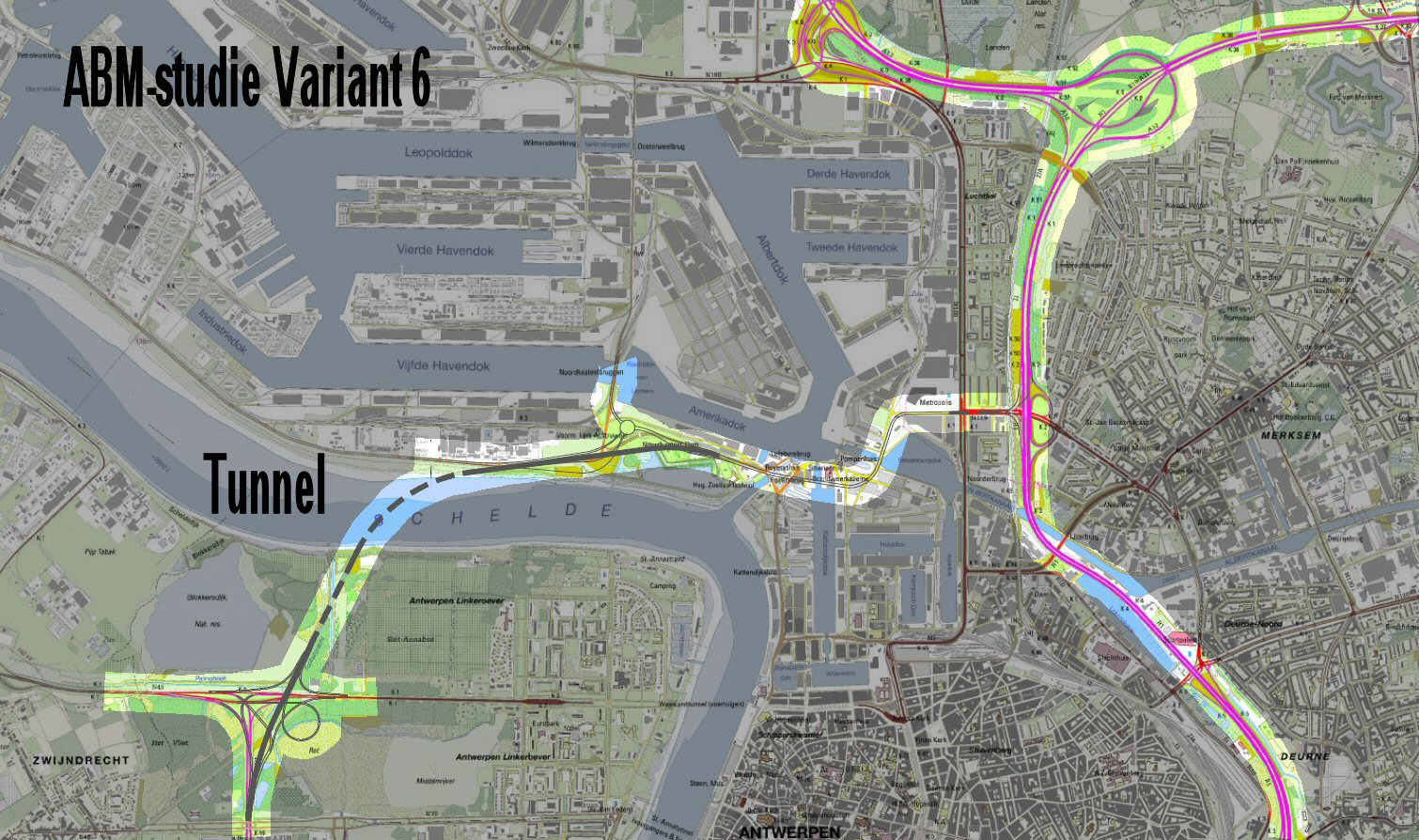

=== Dewael government I (13 July 1999 – 5 June 2003) ===
A bridge was clearly the preferred option, as it had the added benefit of providing Antwerp with a landmark, but because of low vertical clearance on the Scheldt it was technically unfeasible. After examining all 6 proposals, on January 14, 2000, the Roads and Traffic Administration came up with a 7th proposal, featuring a bridge - not a bridge over the river but a viaduct over the docks and the Albert canal. In the course of a conference organised by Camille Paulus, governor of the province of Antwerp, on April 7, 2000, this latter layout was selected. Construction costs were estimated at 0,55 billion euro. The governor said that he expected to inaugurate the Oosterweel connection sometime in 2005.

The Flemish Government approved the "Masterplan Antwerpen" on December 15, 2000, and stated its intention to levy a toll to finance it. In order to ensure a smooth and efficient rollout of the project, it was decided to create BAM, (Antwerp Mobility Management Company, renamed Lantis in 2019), in order to provide the Flemish Government with an entity under public law with ample flexibility in matters of human resources and financial options. This was considered to be the best way to attract specialist professionals at a level equivalent to market conditions (which is not compatible with remuneration policies in the Flemish civil service)

In September 2001, the public tender for research, specifications and project management for the Oosterweel Link and all other Masterplan projects, for the complete duration of the execution of the Masterplan Antwerpen, was awarded to Temporary Association TV SAM (Studiegroep Antwerpen Mobiel: Belgroma –Technum – Gedas). Costs were estimated at 0,59 billion euro and the timeframe at 6 years. It wasn't long before TV SAM indicated that the estimated realisation period of 6 years was not realistic.

=== Somers I government (11 June 2003 – 20 July 2004) ===
In October 2003, according to the new prognosis - assuming maximal overlap of administrative procedures and public consultation processes - construction would, at the very earliest, start by the middle of 2005.

In September 2003 BAM had started managing projects for the Masterplan Antwerpen. Bruno Accou was appointed general manager of BAM. Yvan Verbakel, who was familiar with the project as the former head of department at the Roads and Traffic Administration, was appointed operations manager. Kris Blommaert became financial manager and Leo Van Der Vliet was transferred from TV SAM to be appointed administrative manager.

In 2004, the total construction cost was estimated at 0,95 billion euro. On February 20, 2004, the BAM board of directors decided that each separate part of the construction could be allocated to a different construction company as a separate lot.

On June 18, 2004, the board of directors reconsidered its decision of February 20, 2004 and decided that the allocation of the whole project to a single consortium would be preferable. The tender procedure was started on July 9, 2004, date of its publication in the National Bulletin of Tenders.

=== Leterme I Government (20 July 2004 – 28 June 2007) ===
At the end of December 2004, 4 consortia (temporary trading associations Bouyges, LORO, Antwerpse Bouwwerken and Noriant) were selected to enter the negotiation procedure. Construction works was scheduled to start in the course of the first quarter of 2006. In February 2005 the Antwerp city aldermen were among the first to see a scale model of the viaduct. The city council immediately ordered an investigation in order to find out whether a tunnel might be a viable alternative. BAM let it be known that building a tunnel would mean they would have to raise the price to 2 billion euros, 850 million euros more than the price of a viaduct. BAM was of the opinion that, given the parameters of its business plan, they didn't have sufficient means to pay for this additional cost. BAM also argued that any changes to the project at this stage would lead to damage claims from the consortia that had been selected for the negotiations procedure in December 2004. On February 24, 2005, Minister Kris Peeters (CD&V) announced that the viaduct would be named 'Lange Wapper'. The minister's spokesperson added that this would be a bridge that would strengthen ties between all of the population of Antwerp. On February 24, 2005, a row erupted in the Flemish Parliament because Minister Peeters refused to allow the scale model to be shown to the members of parliament. During this parliamentary session Minister Peeters admitted that he wasn't in favour of the alternative to a bridge, i.e. a tunnel underneath the 'Eilandje' area. This alternative would require more research, meaning it would take a few years longer. He said the time had come to make a decision on the exact route as well as on the specifications of the bridge. On June 10, 2005, the Flemish Government (Leterme I) decided on the basis of the plan-MER (milieu effecten rapport- survey of the effects of a project on the environment) that the Master plan Antwerp would be executed in its entirety, with a toll levy on the Oosterweel connection. Minister Peeters expected to break ground in 2008 and to inaugurate the connection at the earliest in 2010. In July 2005 the estimate was revised and set at 1,345 billion euro. This increase in costs was a consequence of the government's wish to build a nicer-looking bridge (50 million euro) and a better connection with the R1 (94 million euro). On September 6, 2005, citizen action group stRaten-generaal proposed its own alternative plan, featuring a new tunnel further north of the city, and keeping the existing Kennedy Tunnel accessible to all vehicles. According to them, this would ensure that a lot fewer people would suffer the consequences of the new highway and the traffic congestion ensuing from it.

On September 16, 2005, the Flemish Government chose as its preferred means of realising the Oosterweel Link a layout completing the Antwerp Ring Road by means of a sunk tunnel underneath the Scheldt, running from the Left Bank via the Sint-Annabos next to Blokkersdijk, to the Right Bank right next to the Oosterweel church. This proposal requires the felling of the Sint-Annabos woodland and partially re-wooding it after the completion of the project. Past the connection point with the road to and from the harbour, the Oosterweel connection joins the existing Merksem flyover by means of the "Lange Wapper" bridge. As a consequence, at Sportpaleis, the Merksem viaduct will double in width on the Lobroekdok side.

The stRaten-generaal proposal was judged to be unfeasible by the Flemish Government and BAM. According to the Flemish Government, European legislation would not allow levying toll on lorry traffic at the Kennedy tunnel as a means of financing the project. Citizens' group stRaten-generaal disputed this and insisted that the question be put explicitly to the European Commission. In December 2008, the European Commission has confirmed stRaten-generaal's stance on the matter.

At the end of October 2005, a first instance of participation in the decision-making process took place on the occasion of the drafting of the GRUP (Gewestelijk Ruimtelijk Uitvoeringsplan) for the Oosterweel connection and the construction sites it would require. StRaten-generaal took this occasion to elucidate its own proposal. At the start of the public enquiry Camille Paulus, Antwerp province governor, declared that all possible alternatives had been examined, including the stRaten-generaal one, and that any new survey would lead to two years' delay. The governor also said huge damage claims were to be expected from the construction companies if the project were to be altered at this stage.

On November 27, 2005, the Flemish Government approved the composition of the quality chamber, which was given the task of judging the competing consortia on their architectural merits. Camille Paulus, Antwerp province governor, was appointed president of this chamber. Marcel Smets, the Flemish Government architect, was appointed vice-president. As international experts, Prof. ir. Cecil Balmond, Prof. ir. Jörg Schlaich and Prof. ir. Dirk Sijmons were mentioned.

In February 2006 Jan Van Rensbergen, until then administrator general of the Openbaar Psychiatrisch Ziekenhuis (OPZ – State Psychiatric Hospital) in Geel, was appointed the new CEO of NV BAM. On the occasion of his appointment, he declared the Masterplan Antwerp to be an important societal project, with an impact even on generations to come. He stated that to his mind, attaining a balance between quality of life and mobility is one of the great challenges of the 21st century. Also in February 2006, The Flemish Government decided to replace ir. Patrick Debaere, as a member of the Board of Directors of BAM, with Wivina Demeester (CD&V), as Debaere was to be BAM-project leader Oosterweel connection.

The VLACORO (Vlaamse Commissie voor Ruimtelijke Ordening – Flemish Commission for Town and Country Planning) advised on March 14, 2006, that this new proposal be studied as part of the project-MER. The Cel-Mer (cel Milieueffectenrapportage – department Environmental Effects Reporting) also decided that this new proposal should be examined thoroughly.

On June 15, 2006, Jan Van Rensbergen, CEO of NV BAM, told the weekly business magazine Trends that the second phase of the allocation process would be about the details, but that those who propose a tunnel instead of a viaduct were de facto excluding themselves from the process. A day later, the Flemish Government decided to accept the GRUP 'Oosterweelverbinding' without making any fundamental changes to it, even though the city of Antwerp had, in its objections stated on the occasion of the public enquiry, pleaded for the insertion of less specific prescriptions for infrastructure below and above ground level, as the existing prescriptions only allowed for a viaduct as a way of connecting the Oosterweel junction and the R1.

Three out of the four selected builders' consortia submitted a bid for the construction of the project on June 23, 2006. The group around Bouygues, which was expected to propose a tunnel, did not submit any proposal. The GRUP specifications effectively excluded the building of a tunnel instead of a viaduct.

On June 26, 2006, the 10 members of the Quality Chamber were officially presented. Antwerp local government architect Kristaan Borret and ir. Dirk Brusselaers, representative of the Flemish Administration, former deputy chef de cabinet to Minister Van Mechelen, both joined the chamber. Prof ir. Cecil Balmond, an authority in the field of structural design, immediately put ir. Joop Paul forward to replace him, a director of Arup Nederland, who had, for instance, been involved in the construction of the Nesciobrug in Amsterdam. Prof ir. Jörg Schlaich, an eminent designer of bridges, resigned after the quality chamber's first meeting. 'It makes no sense to take part in a competition that isn't judged by a jury of excellent engineers specialising in bridges, who are knowledgeable about designing bridges.' (extract from his letter of resignation, cited in weekly magazine Humo).

On October 13, THV Antwerpse Bouwwerken, the consortium that had proposed to build a single deck bridge instead of a double deck bridge after a design by Norman Foster, was excluded as a candidate for the construction, on the grounds that this solution did not comply with specifications. In November 2006, the candidacy of THV Loro was rejected by the quality chamber. THV Noriant remained as the only candidate to execute the construction work. In April 2007 the project-MER was completed. That's when it became clear that the survey of alternative proposals had been completed as early as June 8, 2006 - just before the GRUP was approved by the Flemish Government. StRaten-generaal was of the opinion that its proposal hasn't been examined objectively, and felt at least the suspicion of bias hanging over this report. The citizen action group has formulated its objections in an extensive report that was handed over to Minister Crevits. There was no answer. StRaten-generaal then applied to the Flemish Ombudsman, who judged in favour of the citizens' group. A television documentary aired on 26 October 2008 on Canvas (public broadcasting) leaves viewers with the impression that BAM was imperturbably favouring its preferred route, and in the process ignoring any and all alternatives - all the while stating that it was involving itself in a broad societal debate. Moreover, during said project-MER, the stRaten-Generaal alternative was examined only by TV SAM, the designer of the BAM-route. The documentary suggests that this might be an instance of conflict of interests, which would, of course, be contrary to legislation. The accusation of this conflict of interest by stRaten-generaal and the response from the Flemish Ombudsman were later submitted as the subject of a complaint to the Council of State.

=== Peeters government I (28 June 2007 – 13 July 2009) ===
On October 1, 2007, TV Noriant, the only remaining bidder, submitted its Best And Final Offer (BAFO) for the construction of the Oosterweel connection.

In June 2008 cost was estimated at 2,5 billion euro. Return on investment in the Oosterweel connection was expected to come from toll revenue generated at the Oosterweel tunnel. In order to guarantee these revenues, the banks requested that the existing Kennedy tunnel be closed to lorry traffic as soon as the Oosterweel connection would be operational. It was also stipulated that during a period of 35 years, it would be forbidden to make any decisions that might diminish traffic levels in the Oosterweel tunnel.

Meanwhile, under pressure of growing opposition, the Flemish Government decided on June 27, 2008, to commission an in-depth independent survey into two proposed alternatives to the 'official' layout for the Oosterweel connection with a Lange Wapperbrug, as well as the official BAM-proposal. Minister-President Kris Peeters wanted a clear decision on the layout for the northern part of the Antwerp Ring Road before the end of 2008. A Europe-wide tender was called. Simultaneously, the government decided to reshuffle the board of directors of BAM in order to restore trust in the holding company. Three civil servants, members of the board of directors of BAM, one of them its president, Fernand Desmyter, were replaced by company directors Karel Vinck, Toon Colpaert (president of Infrabel) and Wouter De Geest (BASF). These new members were supposed to use their experience and their contacts in order to widen popular support for the Lange Wapper, as the Minister-President explained. For the position of president of the board, the government had Wivina Demeester in mind. When she refused, on June 30, 2008, the Flemish Government proffered Karel Vinck as the new president.

At the end of October 2008 Arup/Sum Research was commissioned to execute the independent survey. A supervisory committee consisting exclusively of Flemish government civil servants from the relevant departments was set up, its mission to watch over neutrality and completeness. The consulting agency got until the beginning of February 2009 to complete the survey.

On 18 December 2008, Antonio Tajani, the European Commissioner for Transport, has written a letter to the Flemish Government, stating that on the contrary, levying toll at the Kennedy Tunnel is allowed.

On March 4, 2009, the results of this independent survey were announced. Its conclusion was not very encouraging for the BAM-route. The report concluded that all routes were technically feasible, but none of them were profitable in compliance with the Flemish Government's prelimiting conditions, the BAM-route would be 400 M euro cheaper than the stRaten-generaal layout, and, since the former project was in a more advanced stage of development, it would also be finished sooner. The stRaten-generaal project came out on top regarding all the indicators of sustainability (mobility, the environment and quality of life). The Horvath-route, with a tunnel exactly on the same route where BAM wanted to build the Lange Wapper flyover, turned out to be the most expensive of the three, as well as the lowest scoring on indicators of sustainability. In its conclusions, the consulting agency suggested better management of vehicle usage of road infrastructure, implementation of electronic toll systems and optimisation of stRaten-generaals proposal of a boring tunnel further north.

On the same day, Minister Van Mechelen stated that the BAM-tracé had clearly come out as the best solution. The other members of the Flemish government didn't agree with him. They were wondering what was the use of ordering a 400-page, 2.3 million euro survey, if the principal then chose to overlook its conclusions. On Friday the 17th of March, the Minister-president asked all concerned parties (stRaten-generaal, BAM and the Antwerp port authorities) to advise him of their views. BAM gave its conclusion the blunt title: Arup/SUM unreservedly prefers the Bam-route. This caused Robert Voorhamme, member of the Flemish Parliament to remark, on March 17, 2009, during an interpellation of Minister Dirk Van Mechelen, that BAM was manipulating data from the report in such a manner that even a complete novice could tell that BAM's conclusions were manifestly untrue. On March 23, 2009, the Flemish advisory commission on referendums proposed that the original referendum question, dating from September 2008, be updated as a consequence of the (then) recent announcement of the results of the independent survey. In June 2009, the auditor at the Council of State concluded that there had indeed been a conflict of interest in the matter of the generation and drawing up of the environmental effects reports.

=== Peeters government II (since 13 July 2009) ===
In August 2009 the market research consultancy TNS-media was commissioned by the engineers of the BAM-route to research the attitude of the inhabitants of the city of Antwerp with regard to the Oosterweel connection. The results showed that less than 1 in 3 supported the BAM-route. The survey also showed that more than half of the people of Antwerp supported the ARUP/SUM-route and few of the ones who didn't, were really set against it. Action groups Ademloos en stRaten-generaal pleaded for the inclusion in the referendum of an additional question about Arup/SUM's alternative tunnel layout, but the Antwerp city council rejected this on September 3, 2009, because of fears that this additional question might somehow 'legitimise' this alternative layout.

On October 18, 2009, a referendum was held in Antwerp on the subject of the BAM layout. The question was: "Should the city of Antwerp support the request for a building licence for the Oosterweel connection according to the proposed layout, between Zwijndrecht/Linkeroever and Merksem/Deurne? Yes or no?" Result: 40.76% "Yes" and 59.24% "No". The outcome of this referendum was, however, not binding. It was only meant to be an advisory report transmitted by the population of Antwerp and its districts to the city council, which in turn would offer its own advisory report to the Flemish Government. On October 22, 2009, the Flemish government decided to get to grips with the process, by setting up a ministerial commission "Duurzame Antwerpse Mobiliteit" (DAM – Durable Mobility in Antwerp), consisting of minister-president Kris Peeters, vice-presidents Ingrid Lieten and Geert Bourgeois, minister of public works and infrastructure and mobility Hilde Crevits and minister of finances and urban and land use planning Philippe Muyters. Seven separate parliamentary commissions were set up, each studying one aspect of this project, consisting of a core group of cabinet members representing the abovementioned ministers, the inspection department of the ministry of finance, the PPS-knowledge centre Via-invest and NV Liefkenshoektunnel. The city of Antwerp and NV BAM are represented in some of these commissions. On Friday, 23 October 2009 the Antwerp city council delivered a negative advice. They were of the opinion that BAM's construction licence application was lacking in several respects: it clashes with the objectives of the Antwerps structuurplan (urban planning project), the design contains a number of unsafe areas, a number of road safety and traffic efficiency negatives. The city council also noted that, despite the fact that the Flemish administration had issued a 'completeness proof', the material file was in fact incomplete.

On November 13, 2009, the DAM commission held its first meeting. Afterwards, the spokesman for the Minister-President announced that there was to be no intermediate communication. On the occasion of the 13th follow-up commission in the Flemish Parliament, on January 22, 2010, the Rekenhof, the body overseeing the government budget, indicated that it had no means of assessing the functioning of the DAM ministerial commission. On February 25, 2010, in the course of a public presentation, a member of these DAM task groups stated that the DAM task group in charge of researching the effects the project would have on urban development had had no meetings since it first convened on November 13, 2009.

In November 2009, Forum Antwerpse mobiliteit 2020, a group of company directors (Christian Leysen, Geert Noels, Robert Restiau, Nicolas Saverys, Jan van den Nieuwenhuijzen, Jan Vercammen en Jean-Jacques Westerlund) and academics (Bruno De Borger, Walter Nonneman and Willy Winkelmans), announced its intention to order a survey of the mobility problems in and around Antwerp. The group commissioned Manu Claeys and Peter Verhaeghe from stRaten-generaal to do the necessary research. Christian Leysen said that the Forum 'wants to propose its own – technically and financially viable - solutions to the mobility problems in and around Antwerp'. According to the Forum, these proposals would have to be acceptable to all parties and construction would have to be finished before 2020. The Forum consciously left out the prelimiting conditions the Flemish Government had set out for the master plan, in order to allow for a broader view in their search for solutions.

February 2010 saw the announcement of the verdict of the Council of State on the matter of the alleged conflict of interest that would have occurred during the drafting of the reports on environmental impact. The court did not concur with the auditor's conclusions, on the grounds that the wording of the complaint contained an element that was not entirely clear, which meant it did not comply with formal requirements for a complaint to be considered by the Council of State on its merits as regards content. The DAM-team responsible for licensing concluded on March 20, 2010, that this judgment leaves open the possibility that the independence of the project-MER-experts may yet again be questioned in the course of any procedures to obtain urban development permits.

On February 24, 2010, the Forum first came out with its alternative. One of its main points is that it keeps through traffic away from the R1 by means of a combination of connections between a number of highways to the north of Antwerp. The media reactions to the new vision the forum was proffering were positive. Only daily newspaper De Standaard was quick to deliver its opinion just one day later, on February 25, 2010, that the proposal had any number of Achilles' heels. According to this newspaper the tunnel would be running underneath at least 6 dangerous petrochemical companies. On the same day, the day before Forum 2020 was to elucidate its proposal before the Antwerp city council, Marc Van Peel (CD&V), Antwerp alderman responsible for the port, told daily newspaper Gazet van Antwerpen that to his mind a 'Wapper Light' was the only realistic solution. He said the Forum's proposal was not an option because it would take up 20% of the harbour area and also because there wasn't enough time to examine this proposal. During the parliamentary debate about the Oosterweel connection on March 3, 2010, one day before Forum 2020 was due to present its proposal to the parliament, Dirk de Kort (CD&V) said Forum 2020 was very similar to the story of the ten little niggers as, according to him, the "group of ten" was shrinking, as some of its members were no longer staunch supporters of the proposal. The next day in parliament, Forum 2020 replied that it was incomprehensible that Dirk de Kort was launching these rumours "… as if there were a group of 'dissenters' distancing itself from its own conclusions." Forum leader Christian Leysen concluded.

At the end of 2010 the town of Schoten let it be known that it had no objections to a tunnelled highway on its territory. Simultaneously, the municipality of Zwijndrecht requested that the Flemish Government undertake a serious survey of this alternative, as the town council was of the opinion that it might result in better mobility and quality of life in and around the town.

On March 30, 2010 the Flemish government decided to agree in principle with the Masterplan 2020. This means is a confirmation of the existing view on mobility in and around Antwerp, and of the decision taken by the Flemish Government on March 28, 2009. In addition, they decided to consider building a tunnel instead of the Lange Wapper viaduct, on exactly the same route of said viaduct. If, however, the Flemish government should become convinced, before the summer of 2010, that this tunnel is technically impossible to build, more expensive to build than a viaduct or likely to take longer to build, then the originally planned viaduct will be built, anyway. Another addition to the existing plan is the Government's stated intention to build the A102, intended to keep part of the through traffic away from the R1 Ring Road.

On June 22, 2010, the weekly magazine Trends announced that BAM was considering a name change. Because of what has happened in the past, the company surmised that a restart with a squeaky clean image would not be feasible if it kept its existing name. Rebranding as a communication strategy has been used before by BAM in October 2009, during the campaign for the referendum, when BAM campaigned as Vooruit met Antwerpen and changed the name of its project from Oosterweel connection to natuurlijk tracé (natural route).

On September 22, 2010 it was decided to build a tunnel version (3,05 billion euro) of the BAM-route. The additional cost (352 million more than the cost of the 'flyover version') is to be met by the City of Antwerp and the Port. It was also confirmed that an underground A102 (700 million to 1 billion) is to be constructed, but only after the BAM-route has been completed. In addition, the final negotiations have resulted in a decision to construct a tunnel version of the current R11road (425 to 530 million euro), connecting the E313 and the E19 highway, after 2021. The global cost of Oosterweel connection, A102 and R11 is calculated at 4.2 billion to 4.6 billion euro. Existing plans to enlarge the entire R1, as proposed in the Antwerp Master plan since 2004, would become obsolete after the construction of both tangent roads east of the city, and have been scrapped accordingly.

== Routes ==
BAM proposed the originally submitted layout for the first time in February 2005. In April 2005 Prof. of Engineering Dr. Horvat was commissioned by the city of Antwerp to examine whether a tunnel version of this layout might be feasible. In September 2005 the citizen group stRaten-generaal proposed an alternative layout situated a bit to the north, further from the built-up residential area. All 3 routes included a tunnel underneath the river Scheldt, roughly between the Knooppunt Antwerpen-West and the Noordkasteel. The way the tunnel is connected to the Ring Road is where they differ.

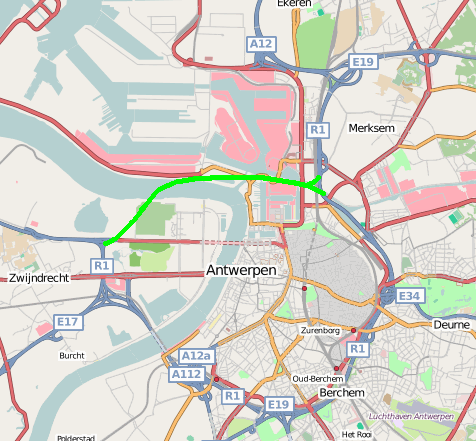
Location BAM-route in green

=== BAM- or Noriant route ===
The BAM-layout requires a toll plaza to be built right in front of the spot where the Oosterweel tunnel is to go underground (now the Sint-Annabos site). The tunnel then runs underneath the Schelde and comes up above ground level on the right bank parallel with Scheldelaan at Noordkasteel, where the road turns into an ascending junction with approach and exit ramps in all directions. This junction then turns into a connective structure guiding one driving direction above the other. This structure ascends toward a double deck viaduct near the Hogere Zeevaartschool, where it crosses Oosterweelsteenweg. The Lange Wapper viaduct then crosses over Royerssluis, Suezdok, Straatsburg bridge, Straatsburgdok and Noorderlaan bridge. On the grounds of De Lijn at Tjalkstraat the double deck viaduct splits into two 'arms'. The northernmost arm turns near the Sint-Jozefinstuut, an institution for physically and mentally handicapped children, over the railroad and the southward bound lanes of the R1. At that point, the viaduct's arm turns into a connective structure. Past this structure, both directions connect to the left with the R1 at Luchtbal, past the motorway feeders at Groenendaallaan. The southernmost arm of the viaduct makes a turn over the Albertkanaal and the railroad toward the southern connective structure. Past this structure both directions connect with the R1 at Lobroekdok. The southward direction connects with the R1 on the right and with the urban ring road on the left. The approach ramp to the viaduct from the south is situated to the left of the R1.

On the left bank, the junction Antwerpen-West is to be adapted, which means Charles De Costerlaan will no longer be connected to this junction, into which, instead, a toll plaza will be integrated. At Noorderkasteel, an additional connection with the existing local harbour roads will be built: the so-called Oosterweel junction.

At the core of the BAM-design lies the wish to levy tolls at its Oosterweel connection, which makes it essential to ban lorry traffic from the Kennedy Tunnel. In the run-up to the referendum, the name of the BAM-project was changed to 'natural route'.

=== Wapper Light ===
As the public inquiry into the procedure leading to the awarding of a building license to the BAM-project drew to a close, the BAM architects declared that the connection at Sportpaleis was not a satisfactory solution. During a parliamentary session on August 25, 2009, one of them repeated his doubts about the connection of the flyover with the Antwerp ring road at Sportpaleis. During this session, it was announced that Noriant's urban planners and architects had undertaken some 'out of the box' thinking, the results of which Noriant intended to divulge to BAM and policy makers the moment the latter put a sensible proposal on the table. On October 8, 2009, ex-minister Dirk Van Mechelen explained that the alternative plan for the Sportpaleis connection elaborated by Noriant's engineers would entail turning part of the R1 ring road into a tunnel starting at the E313 exit ramp, near Sportpaleis. The tunnel would come up above ground again at the bifurcation where the highway splits into the E19 (Breda) and the A12 (Bergen-op-Zoom). According to Van Mechelen, two possibilities are valid for the viaduct at Sportpaleis: either it is used as an inner ring road for local traffic, connecting to the Lange Wapper bridge, or another, new, viaduct has to be built. This adaptation of the original plan would entail an additional cost of 800 million euro.

In a survey of the economic benefits of the Oosterweel connection, transport economists Stef Proost en Saskia Van der Loo from KUL (Leuven University), say that the Oosterweel connection is an economically unjustifiable project and that adaptations to the layout and design of the Oosterweel bridge that have been made in order to guarantee a political majority, are no more than irrelevant marginal notes to an economically unprofitable project.

=== Horvathroute ===
The Horvathroute (Royersluistunnelroute) is roughly the same as the BAM-route, except that the flyover crossing the Antwerp docks is replaced by a tunnel underneath these docks. This layout was deemed the least effective alternative according to the independent evaluation by ARUP/SUM in March 2009. It requires extensive construction activities in the densely populated Merksem area which would, according to the researchers, have a devastating environmental impact. Like the BAM-route, the Horvat-route would occupy a significant part of the surrounding surface areas at the Ring Road junction (in order to widen the Merksem flyover), but the barrier effect it would cause would be even worse than with the BAM-route where the tunnel would morph into a flyover. As this has to be linked in two directions with the Ring Road, this route requires a complex tunnel configuration, deemed by ARUP/SUM to be just barely feasible. Because of these inconveniences, the independent study judged this layout to be the least adequate.

=== stRaten-Generaal route ===
Citizen action group stRaten-Generaal has proposed a route with a boring tunnel starting at Noordkasteel toward the north, joining the A12. This design was the group's own constructive response to its criticism of the traffic streams in the BAM-layout that were the result of the decision to force all lorry traffic coming from the east to drive along the Ring Road at Sportpaleis. The essence of the stRaten-generaal proposal: creating an Oosterweelconnection for the traffic stream coming from Ghent going in the direction of Breda, while allowing the traffic stream coming from the east and driving toward Ghent to take the Kennedy Tunnel – allowing lorry traffic to pass through the latter tunnel. This alternative stRaten-generaal route was supported, from 2008 on, by Wim Van Hees, an ex-advertising agent who had set up another citizens' group called Ademloos (breathless) to publicise the negative sides of the BAM-project, especially pollution (fine dust) and the way traffic would cut off the areas reserved for town development toward the north. The validity of this latter argument, however, is subject to fierce discussion. Ademloos took the initiative to demand a referendum, to allow the citizens of Antwerp to have a say in the proceedings. In July 2009 stRaten-generaal announced that henceforth it considered the ARUP/SUM route to be an optimalisation of its own alternative design, and pleaded in favour of a referendum allowing voters to choose either the BAM route or the ARUP/SUM route.

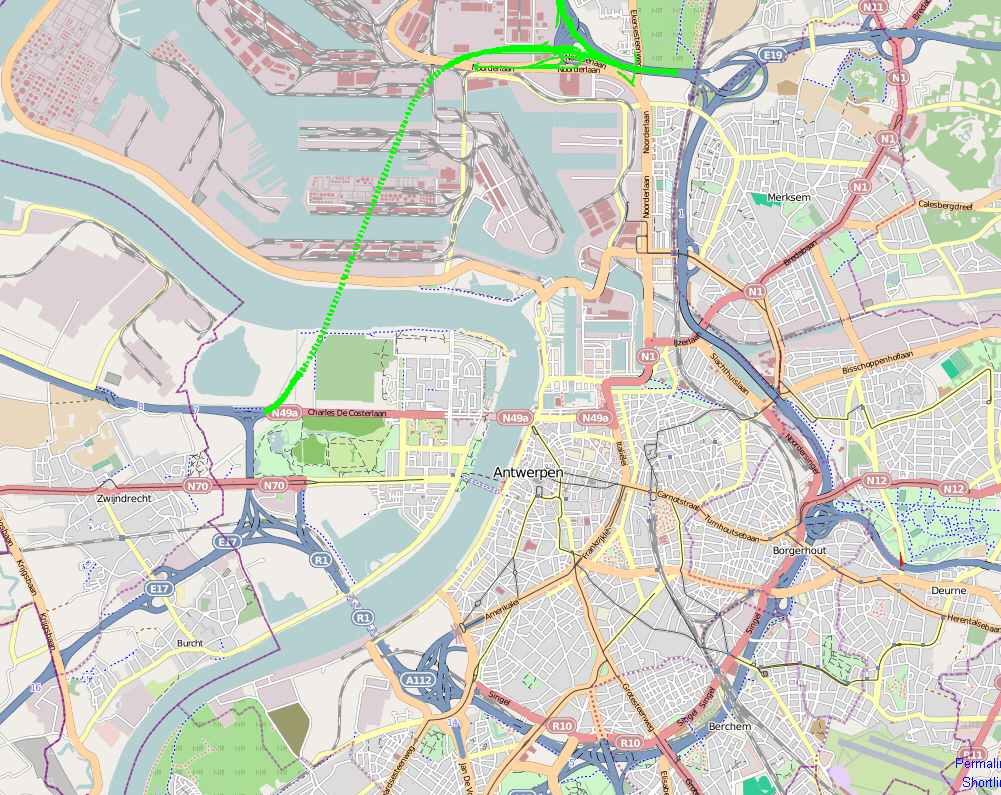
Location ARUP/SUM-route in green

=== Arup/SUM-route ===
In March 2009 the consultancy agency Arup/SUM announced the results of its independent examination commissioned by the Flemish Government: none of the proposals could be considered to be the complete, self-evident solution. The agency recommended that access to the existing Liefkenshoektunnel be ameliorated asap, to immediately implement ATM (Automatic Traffic Management), to keep the Kennedy Tunnel open to lorry traffic and to build a third Scheldt crossing by means of a 4,3 km boring tunnel in a practically straight line knooppunt Antwerpen-West and the A12. Meanwhile, in consultation with the Flemish Government, the city of Antwerp decided at the beginning of April 2009 to order an additional report from Arup/SUM, allowing the agency to examine and refine this latter proposition. On July 9, 2009, this latest route was presented. The use of boring tunnels precludes the necessity to undertake complex construction work in the vicinity of the city centre, as would be the case in the BAM-scenario. Basic investment as well as maintenance costs would be cheaper, an advantage that would lead to higher project yield. The report concluded that this route is a feasible and creditable alternative to the original BAM-design.

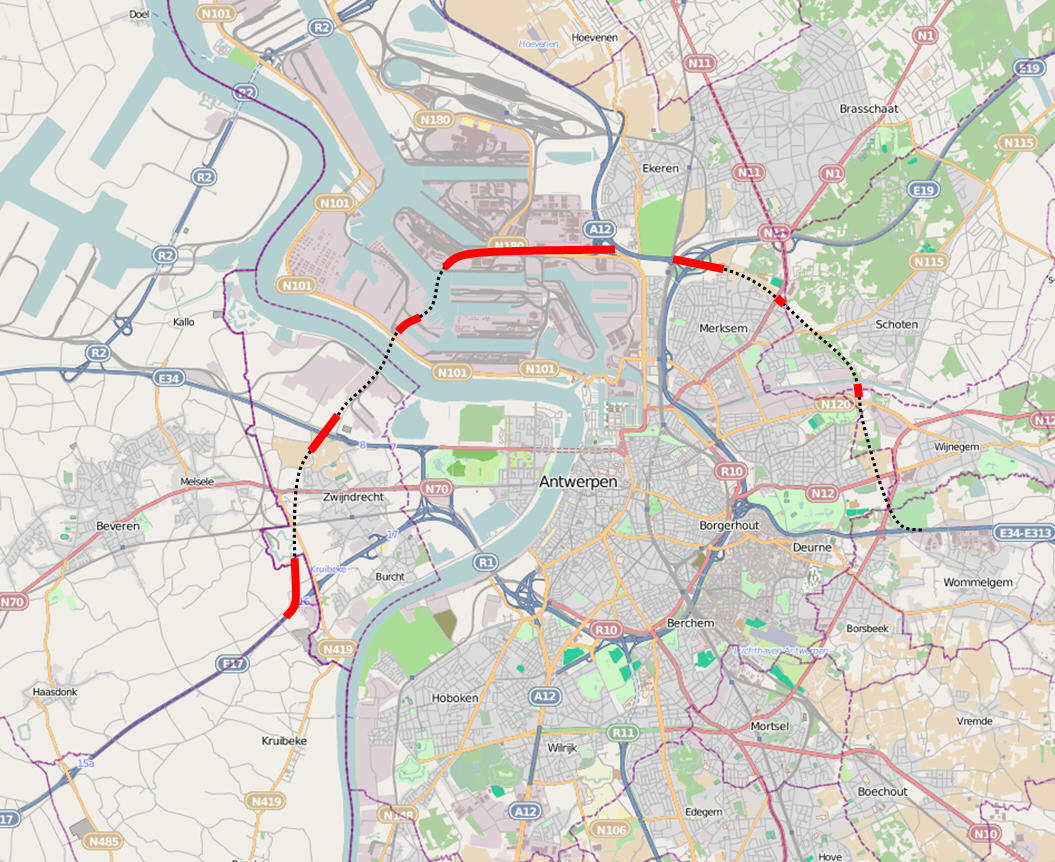
Northern bypass in red

=== Northern bypass ===
At the end of February 2010, 'Forum 2020', a group consisting of a number of captains of industry and academics from the Antwerp area and stRaten-generaal, proposed a comprehensive new plan, starting from the given fact that the Oosterweel connection had been disapproved by referendum. They proposed a 'meccano-scenario', in which the E17 and the E34 are connected with the E313/E34 by means of a sequence of short tunnels to the north of Antwerp. In Waasland, a 'western tangent road is put forward as an alternative to the R2. It would start in Melsele and connect the E17 with the E34 by means of a tunnel. A 'northern tangent', again composed of tunnels, would connect this junction with the A12 and the E19 in the northernmost part of the port area. It would connect with an eastern tangent T102, again a tunnel, connecting the Ekeren junction with the E313/E34 past Wommelgem, which would run along the route of the planned above ground A102. Simultaneously, next to the tunnel underneath the Albert canal in Schoten, a tunnel for local use would be built to replace the planned construction works to add height to the existing Hoogmolenbrug. This bypass would use 'intelligent traffic management' to steer the bulk of through-traffic away from the R1.

== See also ==
- Lange Wapper
- Ringland (organisation)

== Gallery ==
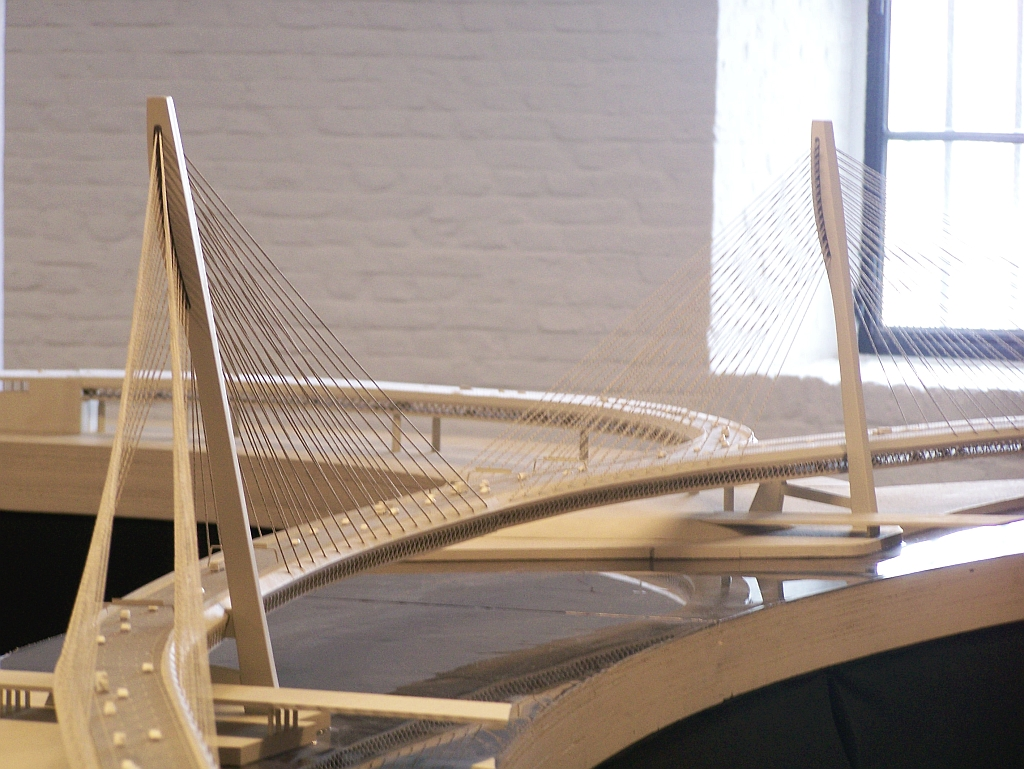
Lange Wapper bridge

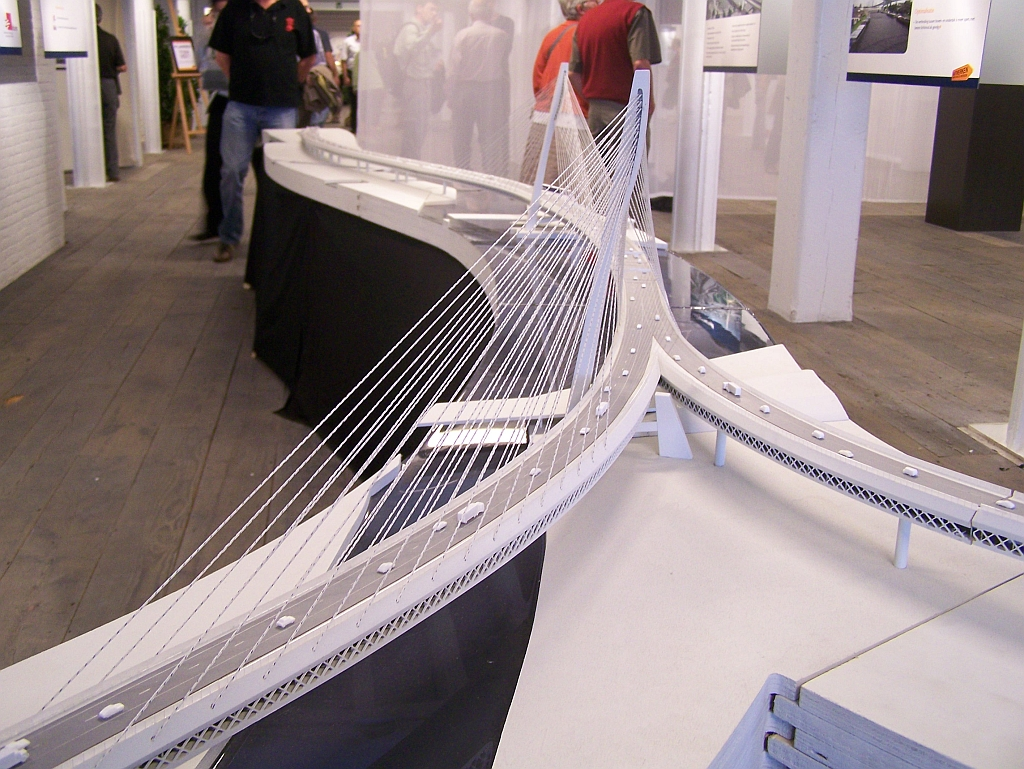
Lange Wapper bridge

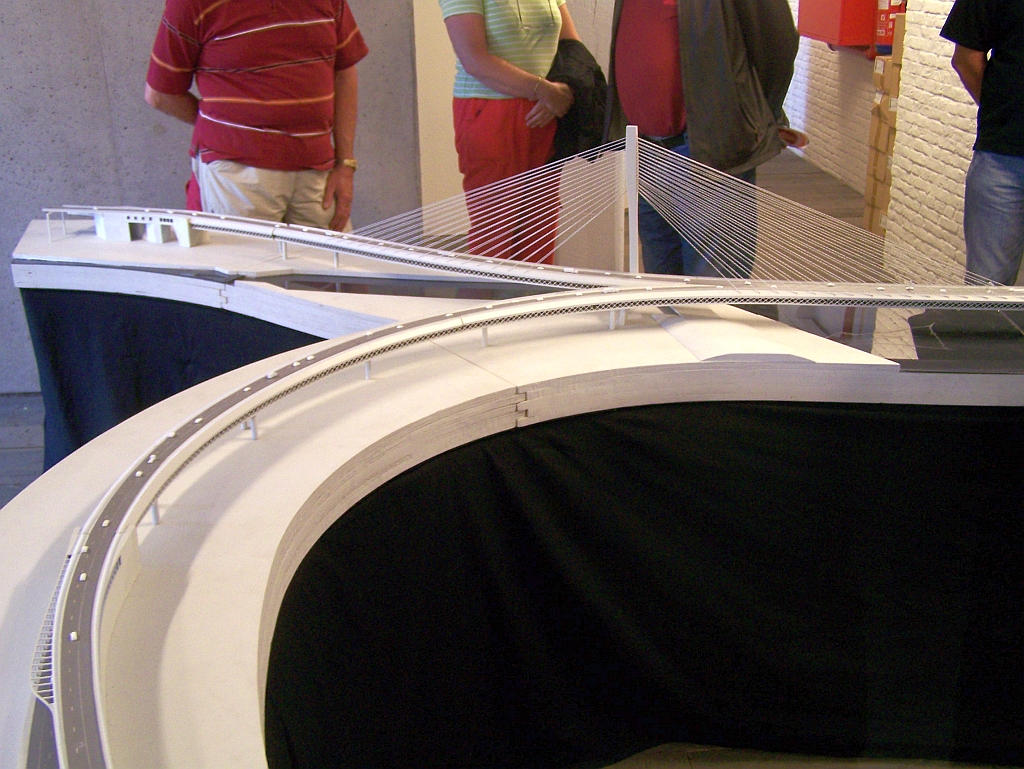
Lange Wapper bridge

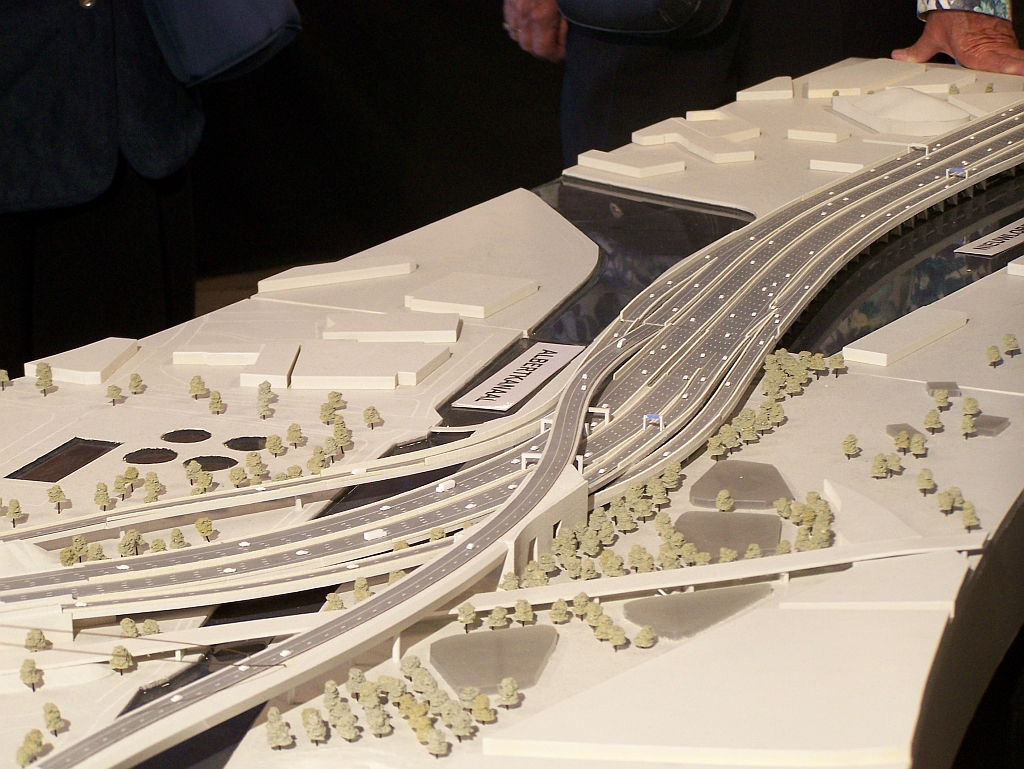
Maquette: Interchange with ring

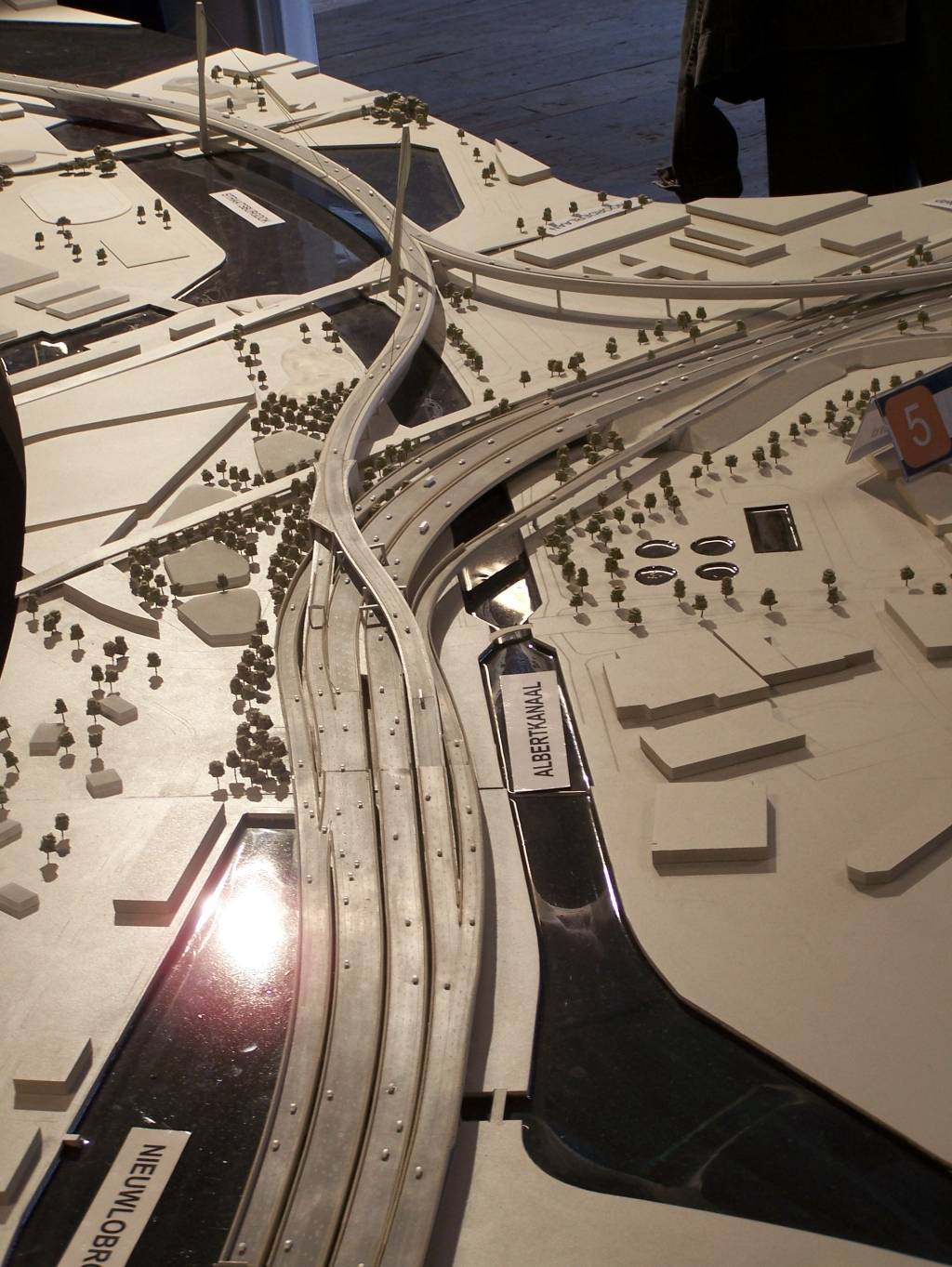
Maquette: Interchange with ring

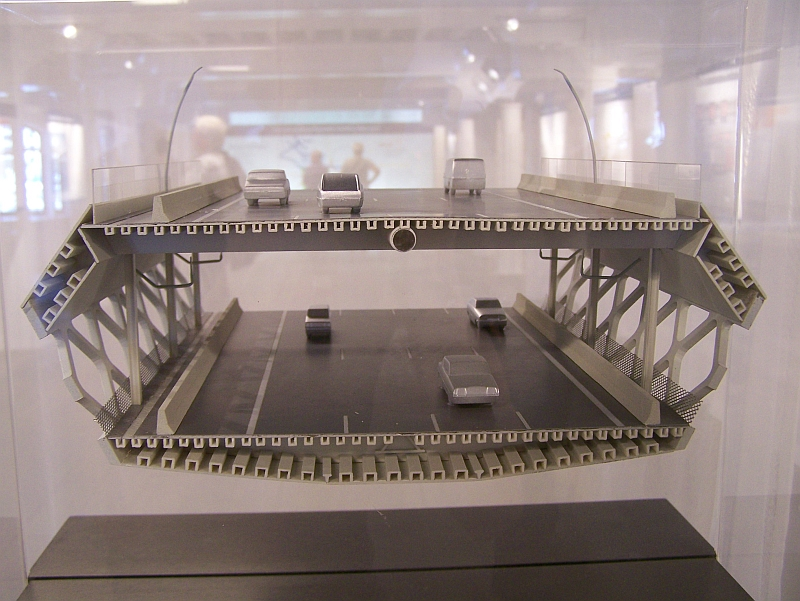
Section of bridge

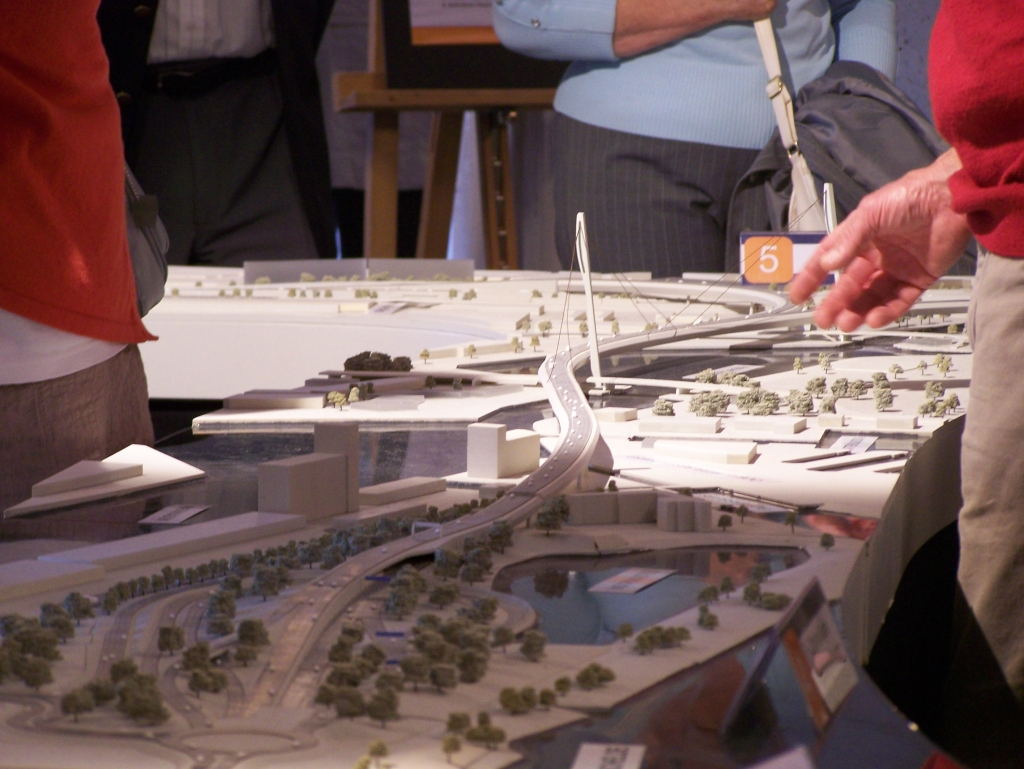
Oosterweelconnection overview

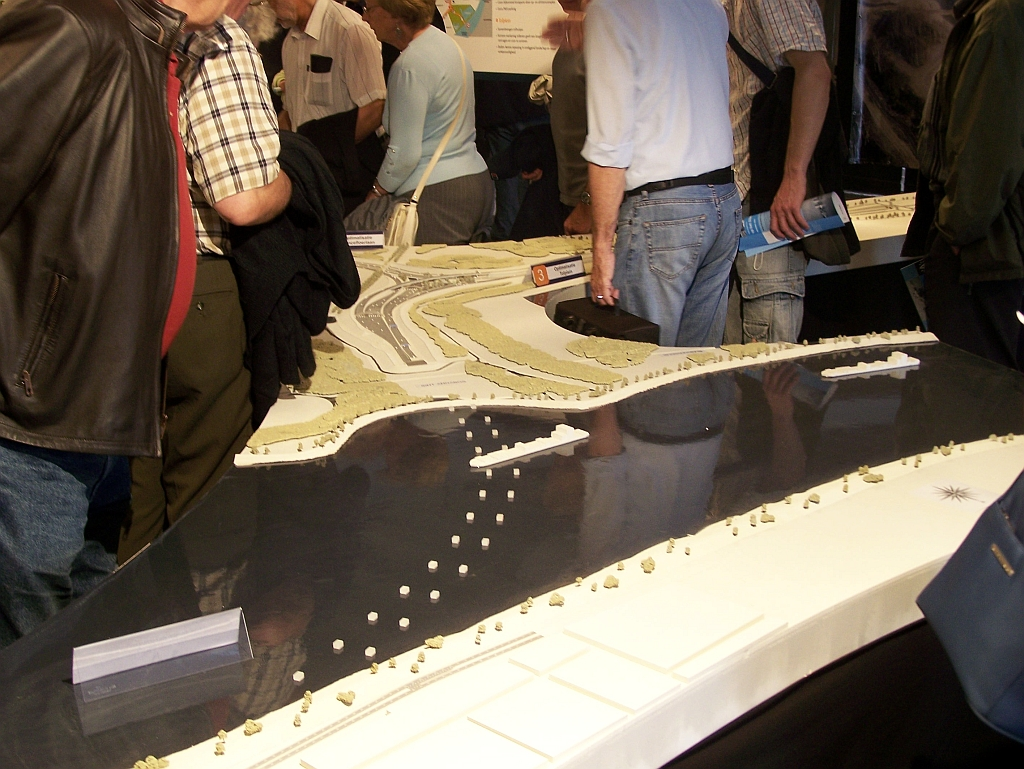
Maquette: Tunnel

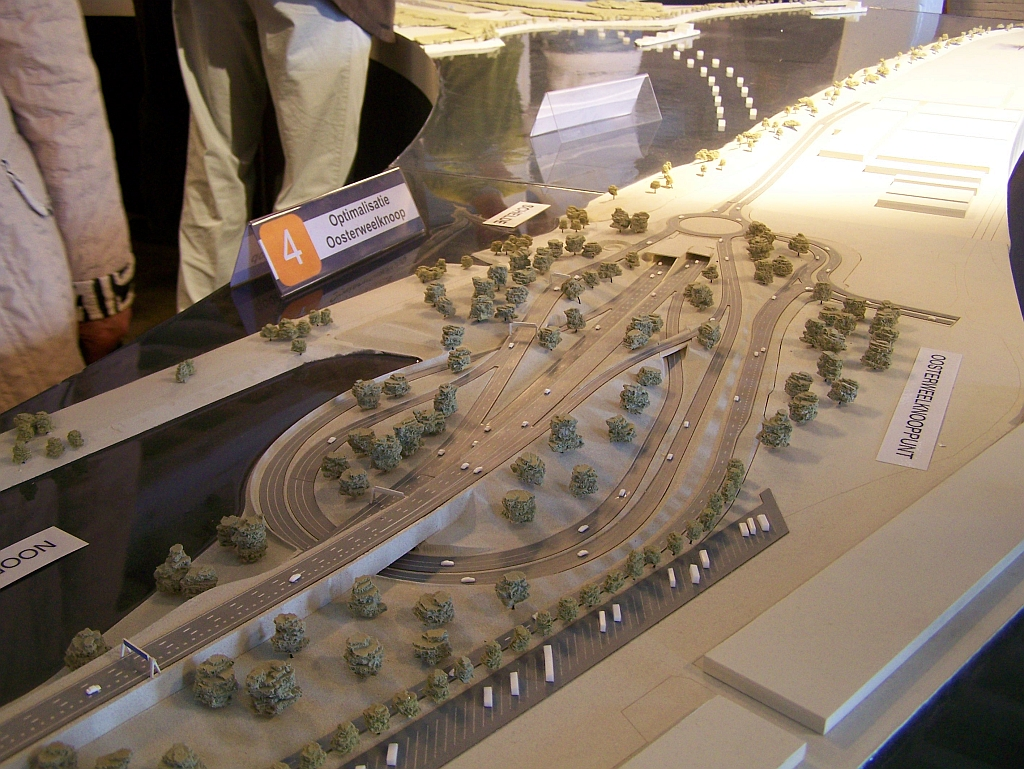
Maquette: Interchange in harbour

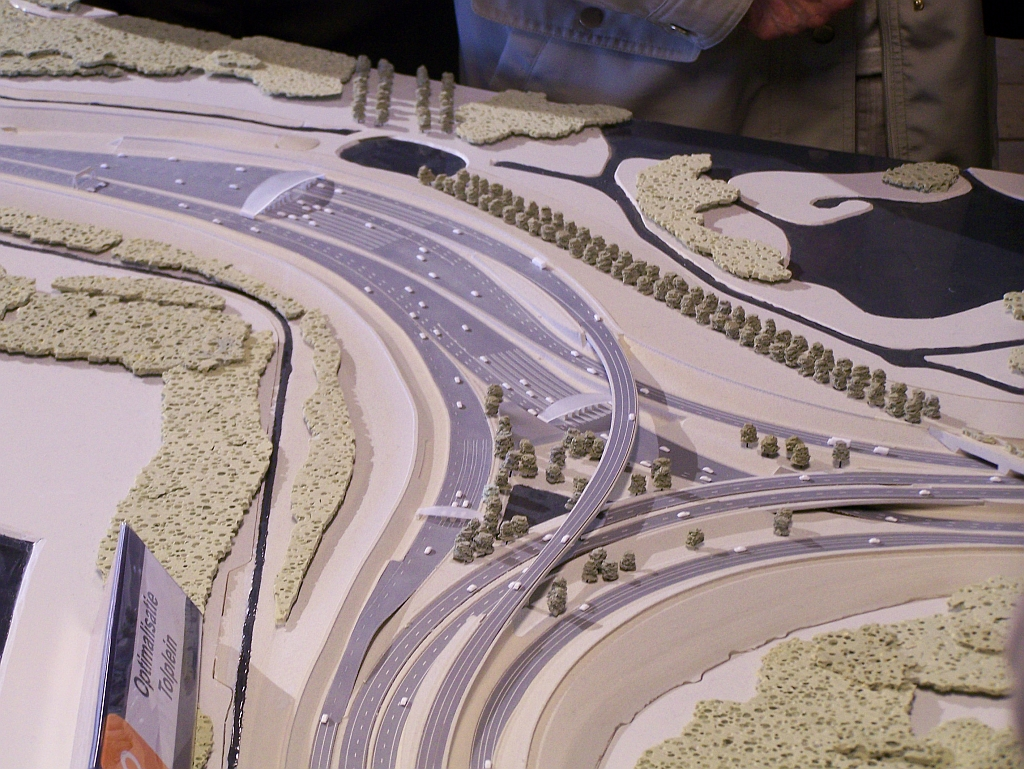
Maquette: leftbank toll infrastructure
