= André Leysen =

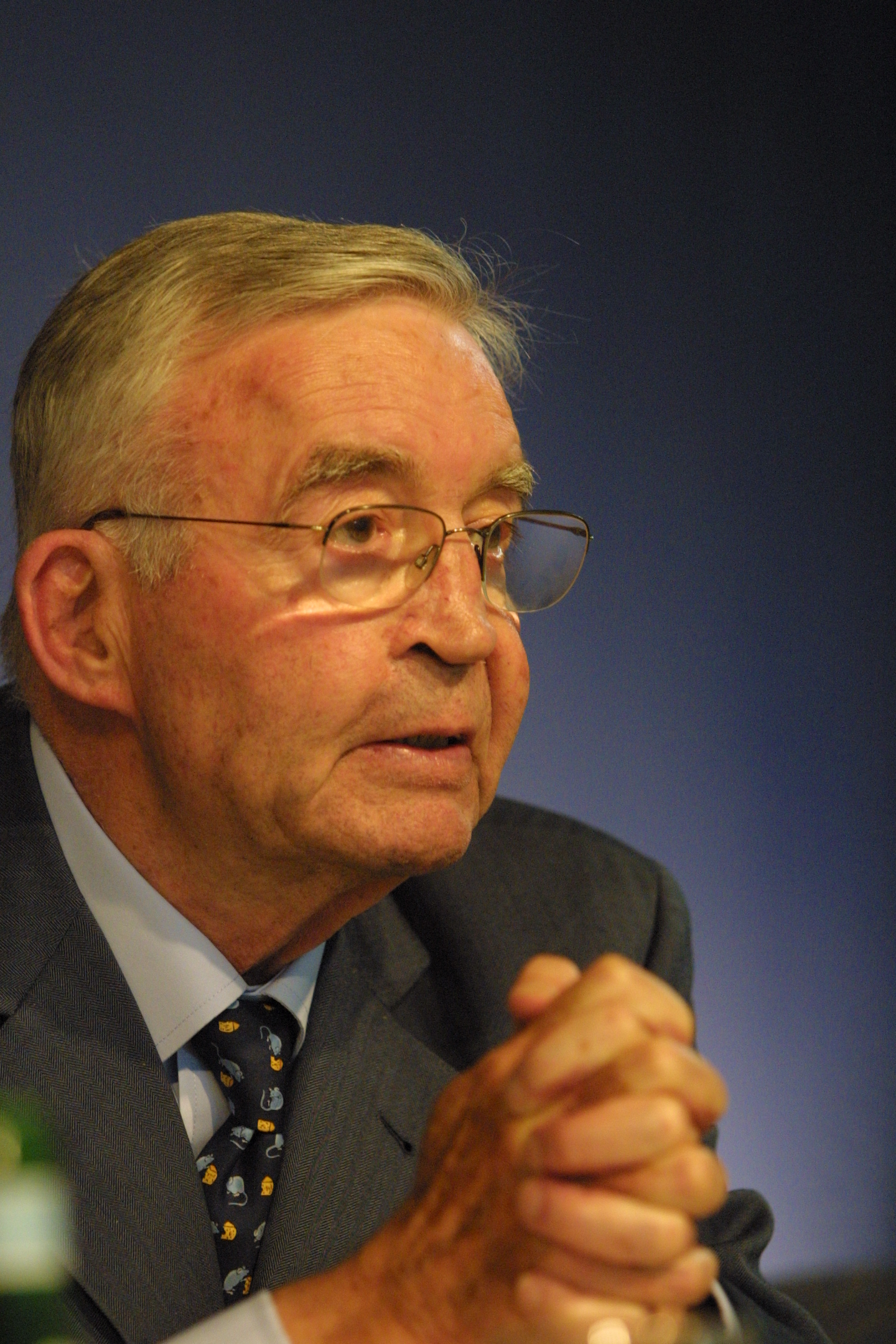
André Leysen in 2002

André Leysen (11 June 1927 – 11 July 2015) was a Belgian businessman. In 1951, he married Anne Ahlers, daughter of a shipping family from Bremen, Germany. Together they have four children: Bettina, Christian, Thomas, and Sabina.

== Career ==
=== Main career ===
From 1952 until 1976 he worked for the shipping company Ahlers N.V., Antwerp (family estate). Since 1974 he is a member of the supervisory board of the Agfa-Gevaert group, (Belgium). From 1978 until 1984 he was a member and chairman of the executive committee of the Agfa Gevaert group, and since 1984 he is chairman of the supervisory board.

In 1976, he was one of the co-founders of the VUM, which took over the newspapers of the Standaard group after its bankruptcy. He led the VUM until 1978, when his son Thomas took over. From 1990 until 1994 he was a member of the presidency in the board of directors of the Treuhandanstalt in Germany.

=== Former positions ===
- Director of Bayerische Motoren Werke AG (BMW) (1988 to 1997)
- Vice-Chairman of BMW AG (1997 to 1998)
- Member of Advisory Board of Deutsche Bank AG (1988 to 1999)
- Vice-Chairman of Koninklijke Philips Electronics N.V. (1983 to 1999)
- Director of Hapag-Lloyd AG (1981 to 1999)
- Director of Bayer AG (until 2002)

=== Current positions ===
- Director of Deutsche Telekom AG
- Member of the Supervisory Board of E.on AG
- Director of Schenker AG

== Bibliography ==
- A. Leysen, Krisissen zijn uitdagingen, Lannoo, 1984
- A. Leysen, Achter de spiegel, Terugblik op de oorlogsjaren, Lannoo, 1995
- A. Leysen, Zwerver tussen twee werelden, Reflecties van een maatschappelijk bewogen ondernemer, 2002, Lannoo

== Sources ==
- Jan Bohets, Met weloverwogen lichtzinnigheid, Lannoo (biography).
- Luc Rosenzweig, En Belgique, une mémoire collective divisée, Le Monde, 14 March 1998 (http://www.lemonde.fr/web/article/0,1-0@2-641295,36-658136@51-658124,0.html)
