= Christian Leysen =

Belgian businessman (born 1954)

- Born: 1954 (age 71–72); Wilrijk
- Occupation: Businessman

Christian Leysen (born 1954) is a Belgian businessman, and Chairman of the International Advisory board of Antwerp Management School, who developed several Belgian ventures to large international companies.

== Biography ==
Born in Wilrijk as son of André Leysen, Leysen obtained a Commercial engineer - Master's degree in Law at the Vrije Universiteit Brussel in 1976. There he was president of the fraternity "Solvay" in 1974–1975.

Leysen started his career in 1976 with Arthur Andersen & Co, the international audit and consulting company. In 1981 he joined GB Inno BM, the largest Belgian retail group, where he was in charge of the Maxi division's logistics and organisation. In 1984 he founded the information technology service provider Xylos. In 1989 he took over daily management of Ahlers, an Antwerp-based shipping company, and made it a logistical and maritime service provider. In 1994, he brought Ahlers back into private ownership through a buy-out operation of Stinnes AG (Mülheim) and became chairman of the board.

He is President of the AXE-group (comprising Ahlers, Xylos and AXE Investments). Beside its activities in transportation and information technology, the AXE-group is also active as an investor via AXE Investments.

Leysen is a member of the board of Agidens (formerly Egemin) and member of the Supervisory board of K&H Bank (Hungary). He was Chairman of the Antwerp Management School (formerly called UAMS) from 2004 till 2016. Today he is chairman of the International Advisory Board. He is a founding member and was the first chairman of ADM (a cluster of about 100 IT related companies) and of the Belgian Enterprise Network for Social Cohesion (renamed Business & Society and subsequently 'The Shift').

Christian Leysen is married to Brigitte Guillaume and together they have four children: Caroline, Nathalie, Patrick and Denis. His brother Thomas Leysen was CEO of Umicore until 2008.

== Political ==
In 2000, Christian Leysen, a member of the Open Vld was elected in the Antwerp city council. Urban planning is his main interest. He was also active in the debate of the Lange Wapperbrug and the Oosterweel Link.

== Selected publications ==
- C. Leysen, Antwerpen, Onvoltooide Stad. Ontwikkeling tussen droom en daad, Lannoo 2003
- C. Leysen (Ed.), Stadslucht maakt vrij, VUBPRESS, Brussel, 2005
- C. Leysen: Kiezen voor Antwerpen, Van Halewyck, 2006
- C. Leysen and O. Boehme, 100 years Ahlers in Antwerp - A family business in a world port, UPA 2009
